= Łubieński family =

Coat of arms of the Counts Łubieński (1858)

The Łubieński family (plural: Łubieńscy; feminine singular: Łubieńska) are Polish nobles who take their name from the village of Łubna-Jarosłaj near Sieradz, in central Poland. They attained magnate status in the 18th century before the Partitions of Poland. One of their number, the reformer and Minister of Justice during Congress Poland, Felix, received the hereditary title of Graf, from king Frederick Wilhelm III of Prussia in 1796. He and his wife, the writer, Tekla Teresa Lubienska had 60 grandchildren.

Thereafter, their relative economic decline was mitigated in part through their vast land holdings, their fertility and their capacity to participate in church, state, military, economic and industrial affairs. They have also made significant contributions in engineering and the arts. Historically, they are connected to some of the leading families of Poland, among them: Bieliński, Lubomirski, Morawski, Potocki, Sobański, Szembek, Szymanowski and Tyszkiewicz. Since the 19th century, they are also related to families in England and France.

== Family crest ==
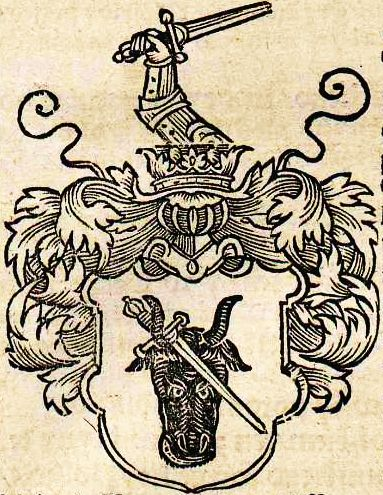
The Pomian coat of arms (Paprocki)

They are members of the Pomian heraldic clan.

== Notable figures ==
- Bernard Łubieński (1846–1933), Polish priest
- Feliks Łubieński (1758–1848), Polish politician and jurist
- Henryk Łubieński (1793–1883), Polish financier and industrialist
- Ludwik Maria Łubieński (1912–1996), Polish lawyer, diplomat, officer and expatriate official
- Maciej Łubieński (1572–1652), Polish archbishop
- Maria Magdalena Łubieńska (1833–1920), Polish artist and educator
- Stanisław Łubieński (1573–1640), Polish politician and bishop
- Tekla Teresa Łubieńska (1767–1810), Polish writer and translator
- Teresa Łubieńska (1884–1957), Polish social activist and resistance fighter
- Tomasz Łubieński (1784–1870), Polish brigadier general and senator
- Władysław Aleksander Łubieński (1703–1767), Polish archbishop
- Rula Lenska (born 1947), English-Polish actor

== Estates ==
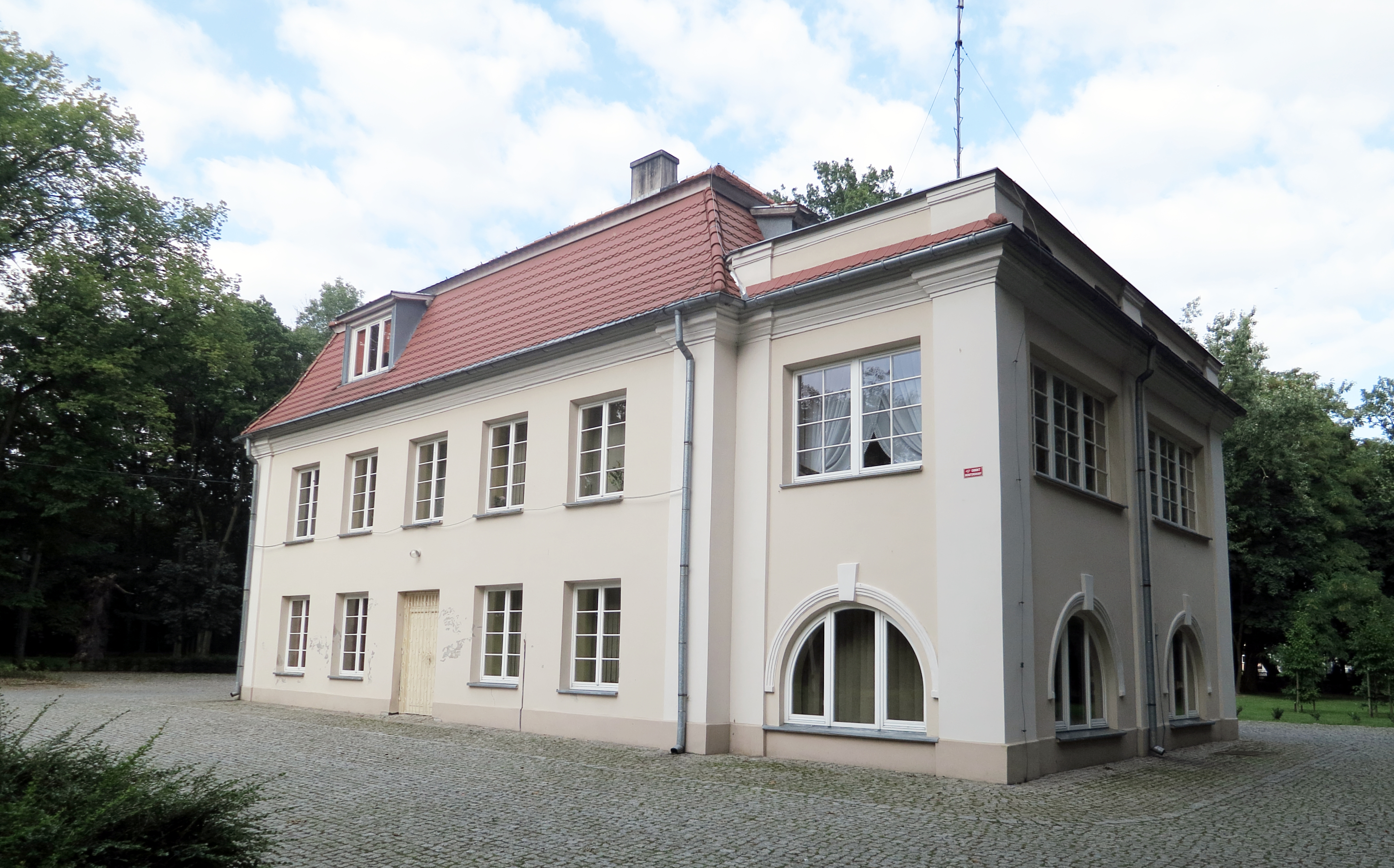
Szczytniki, manor

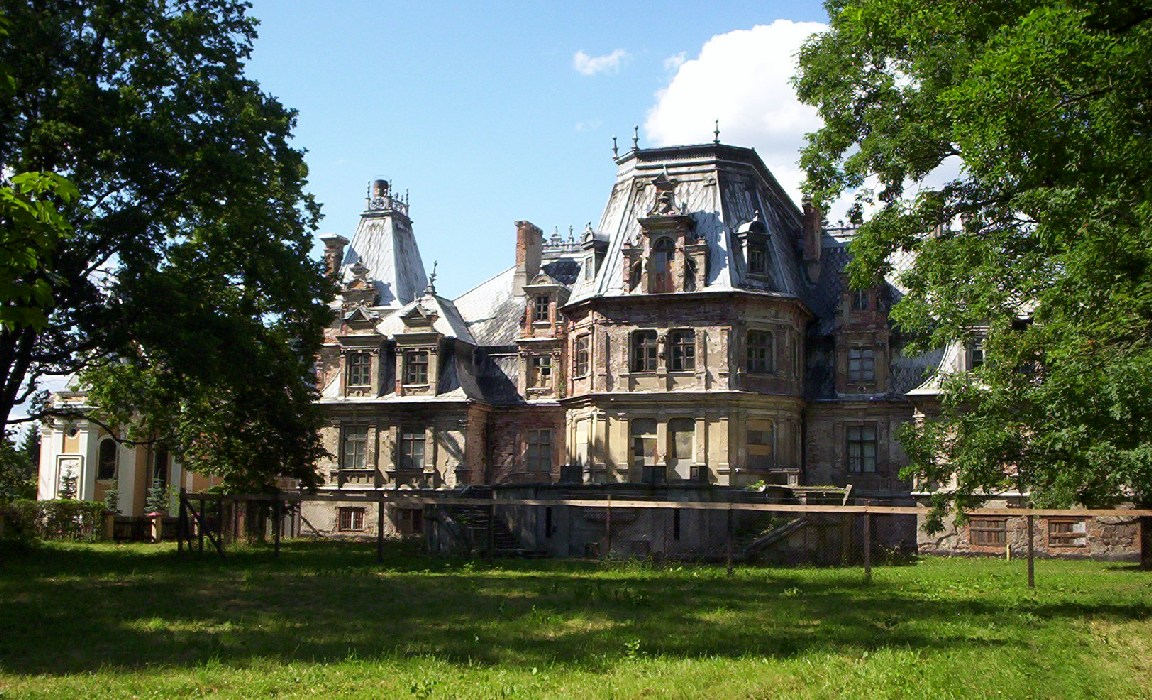
former Łubieński Palace in Guzów

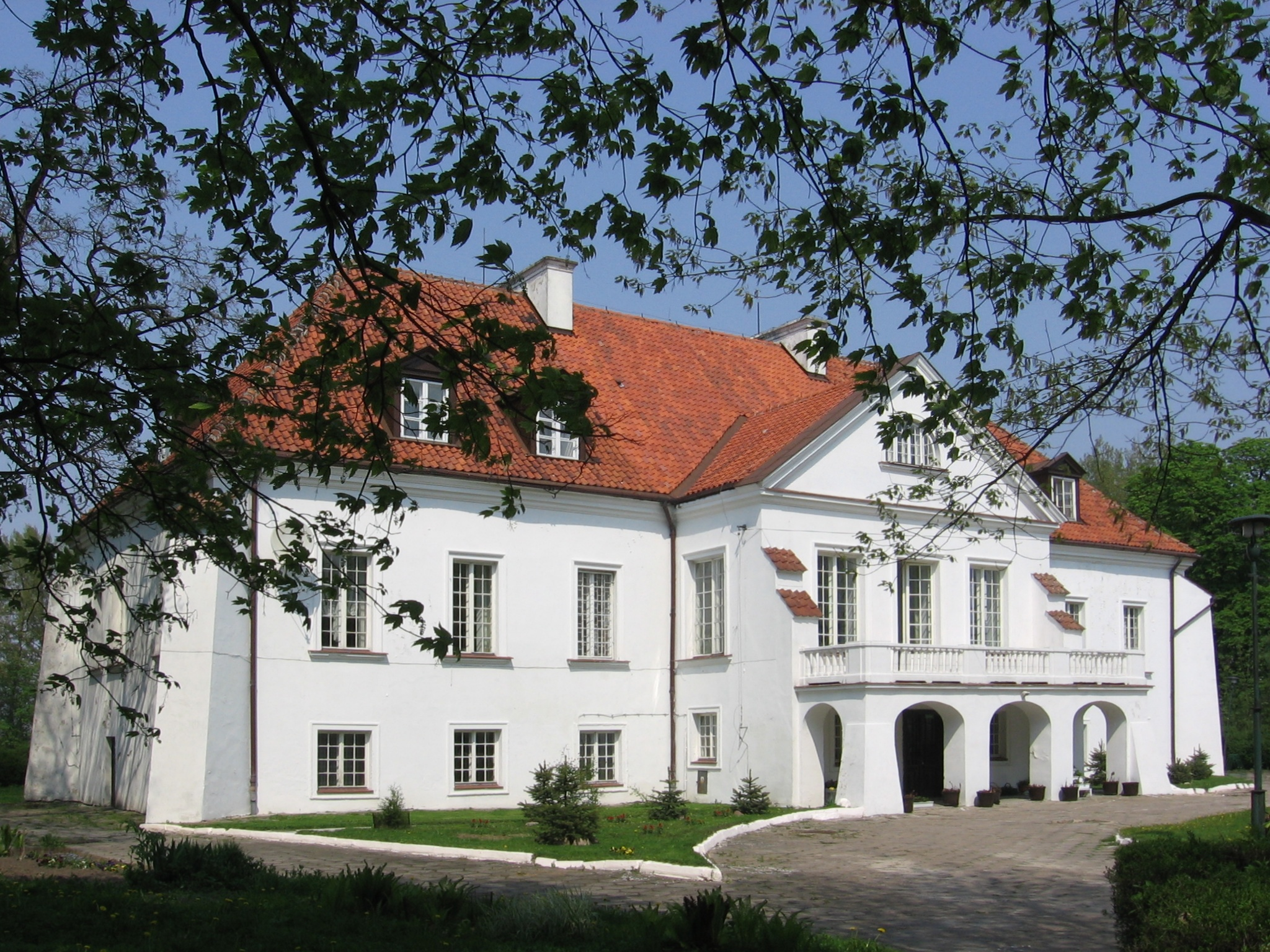
Kalinowa - possible inspiration for Moniuszko's Haunted Manor

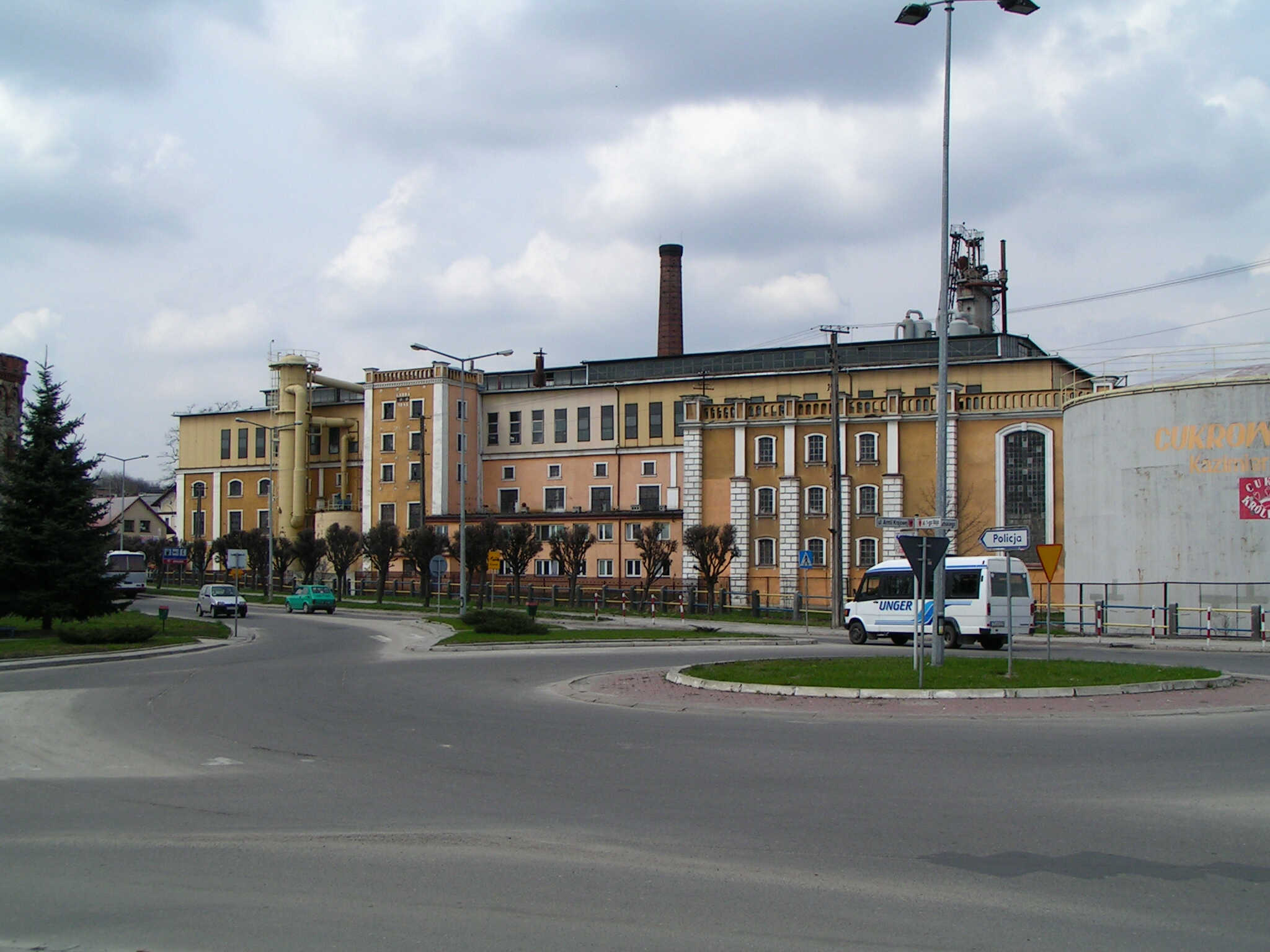
Kazimierza Wielka - Sugar Factory Łubna
