= Theodore de Korwin Szymanowski =

Polish noble (1846-1901)

- Teodor Dyzma Makary Korwin Szymanowski
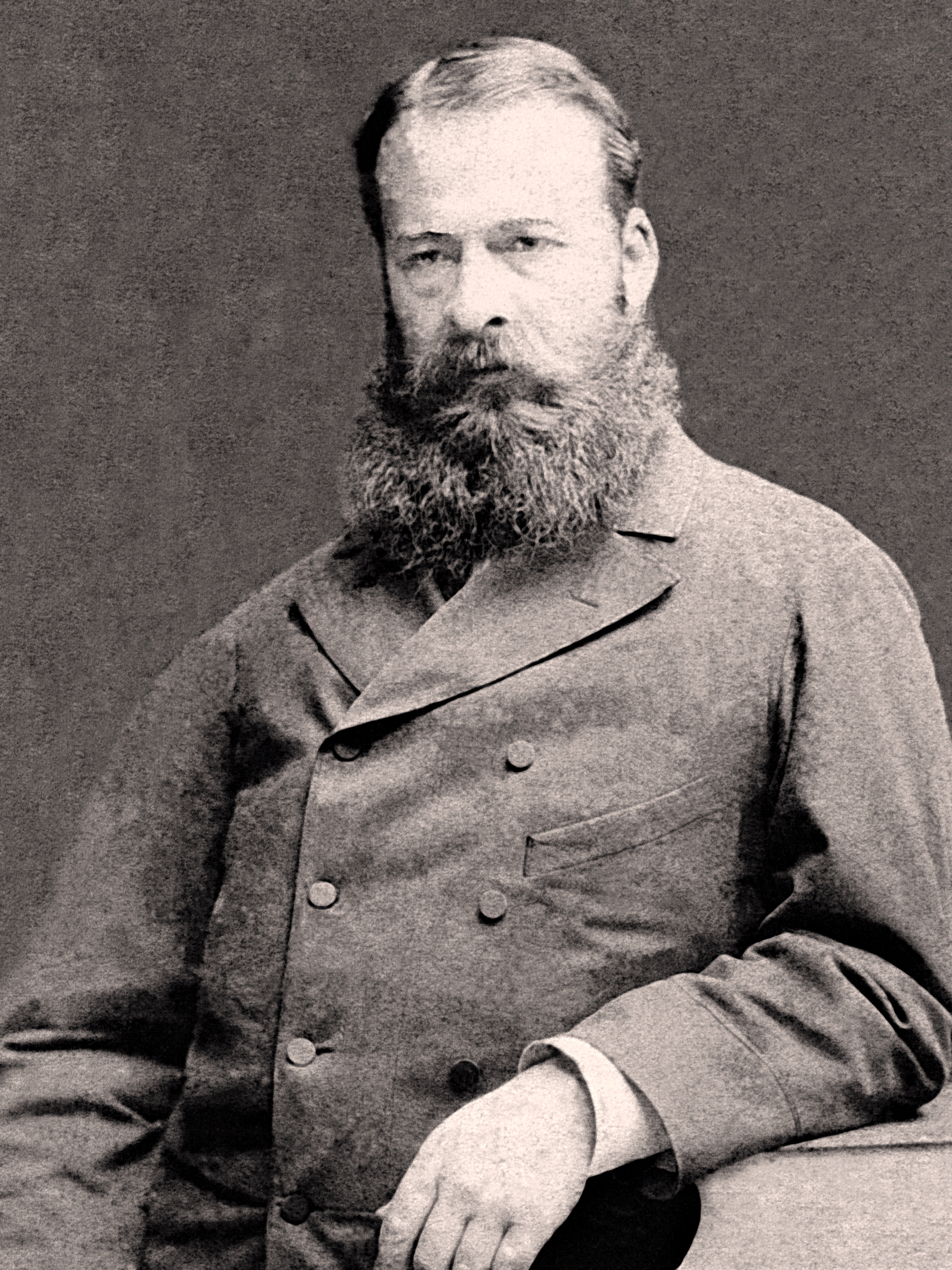
- Korwin Szymanowski, c. 1885
- Born: Teodor Dyzma Makary Szymanowski; 4 July 1846; Cygów, Mazovia, Congress Poland
- Died: 20 September 1901 (aged 55); Kiev, Russian Empire
- Education: Collège St. Clément, Metz France
- Occupations: writer, landowner, political theorist
- Partner: Julia Bożeniec Jełowicka
- Children: 8
- Relatives: Feliks Lubienski, Antoni Protazy Potocki, Karol Szymanowski, Tomasz Lubienski, Henryk Łubieński, Jacek Malczewski, Bernard Łubieński, Umberto I of Italy
- Writing career
- Pen name: Théodore de Korwin Szymanowski
- Language: Polish, French
- Period: 1885–91:
- Genres: polemicist, poet
- Subjects: European economics, abolition of African slavery
- Notable works: l'Avenir économique, politique et social en Europe (1885) l'Esclavage Africain (1891)

Teodor Dyzma Makary Korwin Szymanowski
- Coat of arms: Ślepowron
- Noble family: Szymanowski
- consort: Julia Bożeniec Jełowicka
- Issue: Feliks Szymanowski, Eustachy Szymanowski, Józef Szymanowski, Bolesław Szymanowski, Aleksander Szymanowski, Jan Szymanowski, Maria Szymanowska, Franciszek Szymanowski
- Father: Feliks Szymon Szymanowski
- Mother: Maria Łubieńska

Theodore de Korwin Szymanowski (French: Théodore de Korwin Szymanowski [teɔdɔʁ də kɔʁvɛ̃ zimanɔvski]; Polish: Teodor Dyzma Makary Korwin Szymanowski [tɛˈɔdɔr ˈdɨzma maˈkarɨ ˈkɔrvin ʂɨmaˈnɔfskʲi]; 4 July 1846 – 20 September 1901) was a Polish nobleman and impoverished landowner, an economic and political theorist writing in French. He was the author in 1885 of a strikingly original economic blueprint for a proto Unified Europe and for the abolition of African slavery. He was also a Polish poet.

== Background ==
Born into a notable and well connected Polish noble family, of Roman Catholic observance, he was the only surviving son of Napoleonic officer and banker, Feliks Szymanowski and his wife, Maria Łubieńska, granddaughter of minister of justice, Feliks Lubienski. The composer Karol Szymanowski was a younger relative. He was raised together with his cousin, Bernard Łubieński, in Warsaw and on the family estate in Mazovia in Russian-occupied Poland. Frequent visitors were their first cousins, Jacek Malczewski and his family. From 1858, Theodore was educated in France at the Jesuit-run Collège St Clément in Metz. He absconded from school with the intention of taking part in the 1863 Uprising but, as recorded in 1863 by his kinsman, bishop Konstanty Ireneusz Łubieński in a letter to Tomasz Wentworth Łubieński, 16-year-old Theodore was arrested in Kraków in the Habsburg controlled province of Galicia. There is no evidence that he saw any fighting but he was escorted back to school to complete his studies. In 1864 he would have witnessed the end of serfdom in Poland, regarded as a swift reprisal by the Tsarist authorities against the insurgent Polish gentry. It was a profound social change that was later to inform his original theoretical writing.

His ageing father's declining health and the downturn in the family's fortunes probably curtailed his opportunity for further formal education. In 1867, twenty year old Theodore inherited the family estate. He was introduced into society to find a suitable match. When he was 27, he was introduced during a New Year's ball to the twenty year old, Julia Bożeniec Jełowicka, descended from Ruthenian aristocracy whose legal guardian was Feliks Sobański, a first cousin of Theodore's mother. Marriage followed in 1874 and her dowry temporarily boosted the depleted Szymanowski coffers. The couple went on to have seven sons, of whom one died in infancy, and one daughter. Whether due to the economic climate or to mismanagement, by 1885 the family were obliged to abandon their home and livelihood of the preceding 130 years. There is a suggestion that the estate may have been confiscated by the authorities as a result of Theodore's political activities, although evidence for this has not been confirmed. He was careful to express his controversial views in French and have them published in Paris, out of the Tsar's reach. In effect, the family was 'exiled' to Western Ukraine where it remained in straitened circumstances for the duration of Theodor's life.

== Anticipation of a unified Europe ==
Korwin Szymanowski's polemical L'avenir économique, social et politique en Europe – The Future of Europe in Economic, Political and Social Terms – was written in French in 1885 and published in Paris in 1885 and 88. At the time Poland was a dismembered state and occupied by Russia, Prussia and Austria-Hungary. His work begins with this exhortation:

Pardonnez l'incorrection à l'auteur, qui n'est Français que par sympathie, mais lisez jusqu'à la fin, et cherchez, dans ces idées détachées et en désordre, l'énigme de nos malheures. –

'Forgive the author's poor style, as he is a Frenchman only by sentiment, but read on to the end, and seek, in these disparate and unorganised thoughts, the enigma of our misfortunes.'

As a declared francophile, he envisaged a Europe predicated on a reformed parliamentary system, a customs union, centrally collected statistics, financial contributions from all the participating European states for deposit and lending via a central bank with a common currency, for preference, the French franc. His thesis was not influenced by any kind of Socialism in the style of French contemporaries like Henry Maret or Jules Ferry. It was underscored by a form of absolutism, born probably out of his deep commitment to Catholicism, combined with a deliberate nod to the absolutist authorities in Saint Petersburg.

The text lay forgotten until its rediscovery in a library at the start of the 21st century. It is not yet known whether it influenced, however indirectly, the architects of the post-war European Common Market, people like Robert Schuman from Metz or Jean Monnet, seventy years after he wrote down his economic design for a unified Europe. As commented by his recent editor, Prof. Żurawski vel Grajewski in the postface, Szymanowski's contribution was part of a wider 19th c. European concern about an ailing Europe that felt threatened by social unrest and the Mahdi. His innovation was to focus on economics, statistics and monetary policy rather than on questions of nationalism, sovereignty or federalism. Irrespective of whether it was a republic or monarchy, though he preferred the latter, he made the distinction between nation and state.

== Challenge of African slavery ==
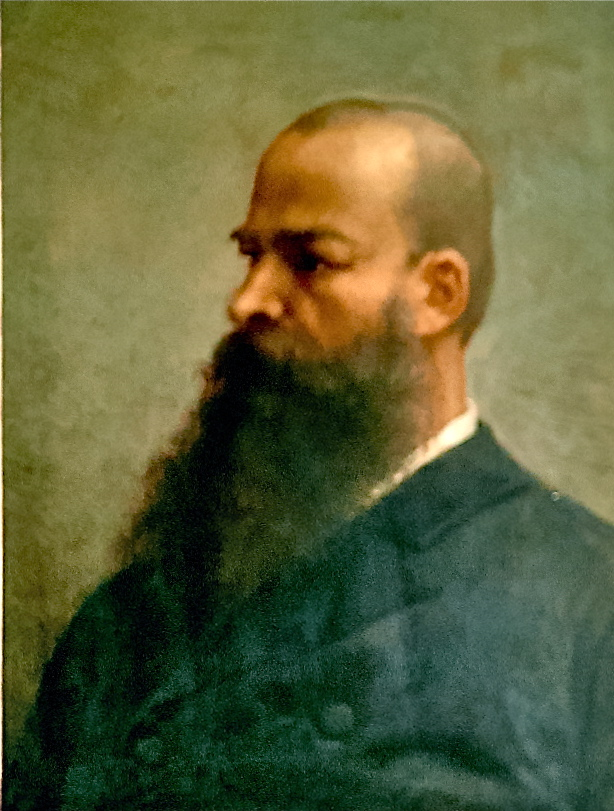
Theodore Korwin Szymanowski, c. 1890 – portrait in oil by his sister, Maria Szymanowska

From his remote exile, as Korwin Szymanowski states throughout his writings, he corresponded with unnamed influential political figures in Paris – he had possibly met them at school – and with mandarins in the ministry of finance in St Petersburg, in an attempt to bring them round to his macro-economic pragmatism. He was able to follow major international events like the European scramble for Africa, discussed at the Berlin Conference 1884-5, which elicited a polemical pamphlet from him in 1890. Through church and family connections, he was able to make a rare visit to France and attend the 1890 Paris Antislavery Conference convened by Cardinal Lavigerie. At its conclusion he produced his text "l'Esclavage Africain", lobbying for an African Central Bank as a means of combatting slavery by enabling the trade in natural resources to replace the trade in human beings: an economic solution to a moral and social evil.

The Polish historian Radosław Żurawski vel Grajewski makes a case for Korwin Szymanowski benefiting greatly from the presence and contacts in Paris of his wife's uncle, the émigré activist and musician, Théodore Jełowicki (1828–1905). He would have been in a position to facilitate the publication of Korwin Szymanowski's work.

== Poetical works ==
Only two poetical works by Korwin Szymanowski are extant, both written in Polish; one published in Paris and the other in Kiev. They are allegorical works in marked contrast to his economic and political polemics, drawing on his religious preoccupations yet informed by his personal dilemmas and those of his nation deprived of statehood for over a century. The first work concerns the history of the world and the creation of angels and the fall of some of them. The second work tells the heroic story of a Ruthenian princess, Sophia Olelkovich Radziwill, who was declared a saint by the Eastern Orthodox Church in 1983. His subtext seemed to be that Christian denominations, especially Roman Catholic and Russian Orthodox should cooperate in the face of perceived common threats.

Despite falling on hard times, Korwin Szymanowski maintained a constructive outlook throughout his written work. He died at the relatively young age of 55 in abject poverty and was buried in Kiev. His grave has not survived.

== Publications ==
Note: The modern Polish spelling of the author's surname is hyphenated, which is how it appears in the 2015 edition of his work on Europe.

in French

- L’avenir économique, social et politique en Europe, Ed. H. Marot, Paris 1885/8
- Korwin-Szymanowski, Teodor (2015). L'avenir économique, social et politique en Europe in French-Polish Parallel Text. Edited with notes and postface by Radosław Żurawski vel Grajewski. MSZ Ministry of Foreign Affairs, Warsaw: The Library of European Unity. ISBN 978-83-63743-22-2.
- A propos de la conférence de Berlin, Ed. Bourdarie, Paris 1890
- Conférence Internationale Douanière, Ed. Bourdarie, Paris 1890
- Conférence Internationale sur les Réformes Parlementaires, Ed. A. Reiff, Paris 1890
- L'Esclavage Africain, Ed. A. Reiff, Paris 1891

in Polish

- Historya świata część 1sza – Stworzenie Aniołów, Ed. A. Reiff, Paris 1890
- Zofija Olelkiewiczówna – księżniczka słucka, Ed. G.L. Fronckevič, Kiev 1891
- Korwin-Szymanowski, Teodor (2015). Przyszłość Europy w Zakresie Gospodarczym, Społecznym i Politycznym in Polish-French Parallel Text. Edited with notes and postface by Radosław Żurawski vel Grajewski. Translated by Maria Dąbrowska. MSZ Ministry of Foreign Affairs, Warsaw: The Library of European Unity. ISBN 978-83-63743-22-2.

== See also ==
- Abolitionism
- African Central Bank
- Customs unions
- Enlightened absolutism
- European Economic Community
- History of the European Union
- Ideas of European unity before 1945
- Henryk Łubieński
- Louis Wolowski
