= Feliks Łubieński =

Polish politician and jurist (1758–1848)

Count Feliks Walezjusz Władysław Łubieński
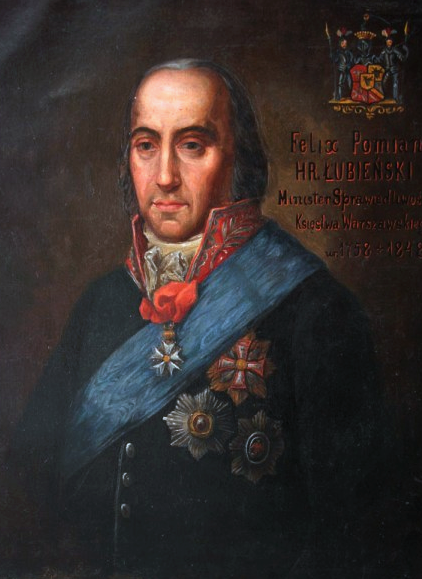
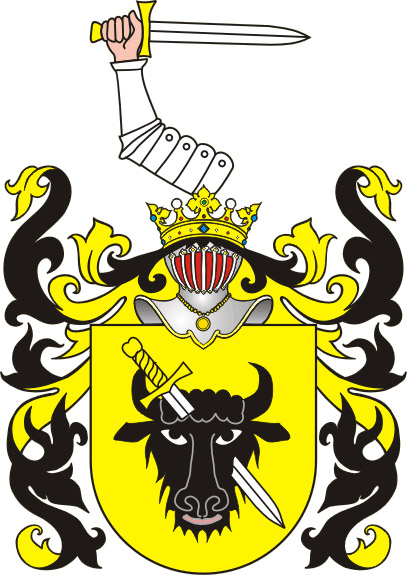
- Pomian arms (Łubieński family crest)
- Born: 22 November 1758; Minoga, Poland
- Died: 2 October 1848 (aged 89); Guzów, Partitioned Poland
- Noble family: Łubieński
- Spouses: Teodora Rogalińska; Tekla Teresa Lubienska, née Bielinska
- Issue: Maria; Paulina; Róża; Franciszek Ksawery; Tomasz; Henryk; Piotr; Tadeusz; Jan; Józef
- Father: Celestyn Łubieński
- Mother: Paula Szembek

Feliks Walezjusz Władysław Łubieński (born 22 November 1758 Minoga near Olkusz, died 2 October 1848 Guzów) was a Polish politician, jurist, Minister of Justice in the Grand Duchy of Warsaw, starosta of Nakieł, a member of the Friends of the Constitution and a Prussian count. With the Code Napoleon, he introduced civil marriage and divorce in traditionally Catholic Poland.

== Background ==
The Łubieński clan belongs to the Polish nobility, 'szlachta', and originates from Łubna-Jarosłaj near Sieradz. Feliks was the son of Celestyn and Paula, née Szembek, of Austrian descent. His father died in 1759 and his mother remarried Jan Prosper Potocki, starosta of Guzów, with whom she had a son, Prot. Her second husband died in 1761. She next married Andrzej Ogiński, starosta of Troki, with whom she had a daughter, Józefa. and a third son, Michał Kleofas Ogiński. He became a noted composer and was Polish envoy to London, among other capitals, during the crisis period for his nation that were the Partitions of Poland. Owing to this family connection and a long-standing relationship with the Prussian court, Feliks was able, later in life, to take over the vast estate of Guzów.

=== Early life ===
Up to the age of five years, Felix lived with his maternal grandmother, Jadwiga Szembekowa in Minoga. Then his upbringing was taken over by his paternal granduncle, the primate, Władysław Aleksander Łubieński (1703-1767), to whom Feliks owed his 'magnificent' start in life. From 1767, due to the primate's legacies, he passed under the effective guardianship of Frederick William II of Prussia and was educated by the Jesuits in Warsaw, from where he acquired a personal preceptor, the Jesuit John Baptist Albertrandi, himself of Italian descent. This guardianship would prove to be pivotal later in his life. He next studied law at the universities of Siena and Rome. This was followed by a short period of work in the office of the Grand Chancellor of Wilno, Michał Fryderyk Czartoryski. However the latter soon died, and having married Teodora Rogalińska in 1776, Feliks settled with her on his estates near Sieradz at Kalinowa and at Szczytniki. The couple were childless and the marriage was annulled in 1778.

== Career ==
He was elected in 1788 as a member for the Sieradz Voivodeship to the Four Years Sejm. Between 1789 and 1792 he was a captain in the Royal Cavalry. He belonged to the patriotic front and was one of the editors of the Act of Confederation of the Sejm. He guided the passage of the 3rd May Constitution in February 1792 at the local Sejmik of Sieradz. He organised an assembly of the Sieradz nobility that expressed its sympathetic acceptance of the new constitution. He appeared on the list of Russian envoy, Jakov Bułhakow, in 1792, that comprised those people the Russians could rely on in the event of a new confederation and the overthrow of the 3rd May Constitution.

He greeted with 'respect' the news that King Stanisław August Poniatowski had joined the Targowica Confederation, and yet to the king he wrote: 'it confounds me that this has come to pass'. During the Polish-Russian War of 1792 he was Sejm commissioner for Tadeusz Kościuszko. After the struggle he appealed for the release of Polish prisoners in the Prussian kingdom. After the Second Partition of Poland (1793) his estates – Kalinowa and Szczytniki found themselves in the Prussian Partition. In 1793 he entertained at Szczytniki, in the presence of around 100 of the local nobility, Frederick William II of Prussia who had gone on a tour of his conquered territories. Łubieński was both a member of the secret coalition preparing the Kosciuszko Insurrection and a participant in the insurrection itself. After the final partition of Poland in 1795, Łubieński's estates found themselves in Prussia, as did that of his widowed mother, Paula Ogińska. Due to its enormous size (6,000 hectares), Guzów was confiscated by the king and given to one of his loyal ministers, Karl Georg von Hoym. Von Hoym was minded to sell it back to Ogińska, its most recent legal owner. Łubieński intervened at this juncture and, with the backing of the king of Prussia, arranged a swap with von Hoym such that he bought him off with his two estates at Kalinowa and Szczytniki in exchange for Guzów. Thus he obtained control of his mother's former property and became starosta of Guzów. He eventually retired there permanently in 1823. In 1798 he was awarded the Prussian hereditary title of count by Frederick Wilhelm III.

=== Napoleonic era ===
In 1806 while he was in Warsaw, Napoleon Bonaparte nominated him to the governing commission as Director of Justice and Faiths. Part of Łubieński's role was to prepare the introduction of the Code Napoleon in the Duchy of Warsaw. From 5 October 1807 to May 1813 he was Minister of Justice in the Duchy. In office he demonstrated both his considerable organisational abilities and a desire to broaden legal professionalism. He introduced civil marriage and divorce. In 1808 he funded at his own expense the establishment of a School of Law in Warsaw, based on courses for court officials that had begun in 1807. In 1811 his institute became The School of Law and Administration. For largely practical reasons concerned with the running of estates, Łubieński opposed the ending of serfdom in Poland and was one of the instigators of the December Decree. In 1812 he was appointed to the Central Council of the General Confederation of the Polish Kingdom.

He was not especially liked by his contemporaries: he was considered at once obsequious and a martinet in his official role and a bigot. This view is however disputed by contemporary lawyer and diarist, Kajetan Kozmian, father of the Kozmian brothers. His diaries were published posthumously in 1874.

== Family ==
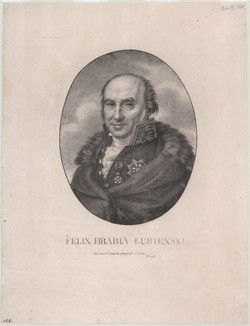
'Count Felix Lubieński'. Lithograph by Józef Sonntag

He was twice married, secondly in 1782 to Tekla Teresa Lubienska, granddaughter of the princely Sanguszko family, a noted children's author, dramatist and translator. In her dowry she brought him a magnificent palace in the centre of Warsaw and the Bielino enclave. They had ten children, three daughters: Maria, Paulina and Róża (later the wife of Ludwik Sobański), and seven sons: Franciszek Ksawery, Tomasz Łubieński, Henryk, Piotr, Tadeusz, Jan and Józef.

His wife died of an aneurysm while visiting Kraków in 1810. During his extended widowhood, Feliks did not remarry, but became a patriarch to his huge extended family and kept up an active correspondence with his children and dozens of grandchildren. He died in Guzów in 1848 and was buried in the cemetery at Wiskitki.

== Legacy ==
A recent historical evaluation of Łubieński's public service lauded his contribution to culture and education in the country through sound public administration, including legal procedures and a court system, the introduction of state archives, a national library, a government printing press and an educated and effective civil service. During his long widowhood he took a close interest in his children's careers and welfare. He encouraged their entrepreneurial spirit by guiding them into 'beneficial' matrimony, as in the case of Józef who married into the Pudliszki estate, where he opened a sugar factory, the precursor of a fruit and vegetable processing factory that operates to this day. Or, in the case of the older brothers, led by Henryk, he donated to them Ruda Guzowska, a tract of land to begin their textile revolution. It rapidly led to the founding of an industry and a successful mill town, known today as Żyrardów.

== Awards and distinctions ==
- 1778 Order of Saint Stanislaus
- 1791 Order of the White Eagle (Poland)
- 1798 Prussian nobility title of Count
- 1805 Order of the Red Eagle

== Bibliography ==
in Polish

- Polski Słownik Biograficzny, Tom XVIII (1973 )
- Encyklopedia Katolicka Tom XI, KUL, Lublin 2006
- M. Brandys, Koniec świata szwoleżerów, t. I, Warszawa 1972
- Wł. Chometowski, Pamiętnik hr. Feliksa Łubieńskiego, Warszawa 1890
- K. Pol, Feliks Łubieński, [w:] "Rzeczpospolita" 28 April 1999
- A. Ruszkowski, Feliks Walezjusz Pomian Łubieński (1758-1848), jego przodkowie i dzieci, [w:] Na sieradzkich szlakach, nr 1/57/2000XV, p. 26-28
