= Tomasz Łubieński =

Polish army general (1784–1870)

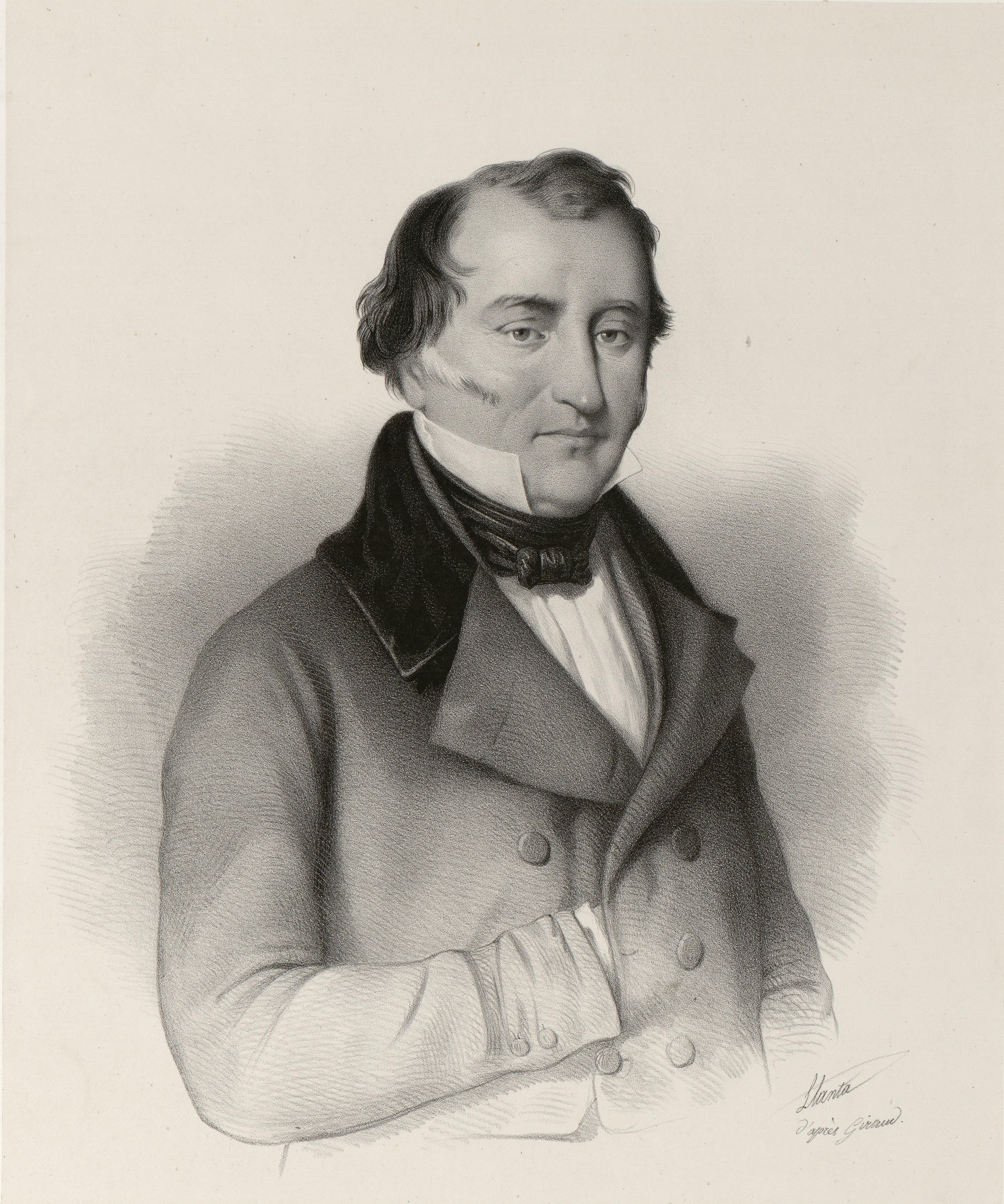
- Count Tomasz Łubieński
- Born: 24 December 1784; Szczytniki, Kalisz County, Poland
- Died: 27 August 1870 (aged 85); Warsaw, Congress Poland
- Other name: Andrzej Adam
- Education: Academy of the Royal Cadet Corps
- Occupations: military officer, Business magnate, banker, diarist
- Known for: military valour, Early industrialism in Congress Poland
- Spouse: Konstancja Ossolińska (1783–1868)
- Parent(s): Feliks Łubieński; Tekla Teresa Lubienska, née Bielińska
- Relatives: Napoleon Łubieński (son); Henryk Łubieński (brother); Bernard Łubieński (great nephew)
- Military career
- Allegiance: France, Poland
- Service years: 1806–1831
- Rank: General of Brigade
- Conflicts: Napoleonic Wars, November Uprising
- Awards: Baron of the Empire, Virtuti Militari, Order of Saint Stanislaus, Médaille de Sainte-Hélène, Commander of the Legion of Honour
- Other work: Senator, landowner

Tomasz Andrzej Adam Łubieński, comte de Pomian (24 December 1784 – 27 August 1870) was a brigadier general in the Polish army, senator, landowner in Kalisz and businessman. Hoping to liberate Poland, he fought on the French side in the Napoleonic Wars, fighting at Essling, Wagram, Dresden, Ulm, Leipzig, Hanau and Berezina, for which Napoleon made him a baron de l'Empire. He also later took part in the November Uprising against Russia.

== Life ==
=== Early life ===
He was born on 24 December 1784 in Szczytniki near Kalisz. From an old Polish noble family, Tomasz's parents were Feliks Łubieński, count of Pomian and the minister of justice in the Duchy of Warsaw, and Tekla Teresa Łubieńska née Bielińska, herself a poet and an author of historical plays. Her main works were Wanda, królowa polska (1806), (Wanda, Queen of Poland), and Karol Wielki i Witykind (1807) (Charlemagne and Wedekind). She also translated the works of Jean Racine and Voltaire into Polish. Tomasz was the second of their ten children – the eldest sibling was Franciszek, the others being Piotr, Jan, Henryk, Tadeusz, Józef, Maria, Paulina and Róża.

Aged six, Tomasz entered the Academy of the Royal Cadet Corps (the military cavalry school). His first two years there were spent learning foreign languages, artillery science and fencing. His first rank was as 'Chorąży' (standard bearer). The next five years were spent on military construction and engineering. In 1801 he received further education in Vienna before moving to Warsaw under the tutelage of his uncle, Antoni Protazy Potocki. He also came under the influence of count Wincenty Krasiński (1782–1858), a political activist who set up the 'Society of Friends of the Fatherland' but who was later to refuse to join the November Uprising. In 1805 Tomasz married Konstancja Ossolińska (1783–1868), who brought a major dowry in the form of estates near the town of Chełm. They had a daughter, Adela, born 1806 and a son, Napoleon Leon, born 1812 .

=== 1806–1825 ===
In 1806 the French entered Warsaw, where Napoleon was met by a guard of honour made up of major Polish statesmen. Hoping to liberate Poland from Russia, Łubieński and other Polish officers fought on the French side. In 1807 the army of the Duchy of Warsaw was made up of 31,713 infantrymen, 6,035 cavalrymen and 95 cannon. At the same time the Polish 1st Light Cavalry Regiment of the Imperial Guard formed in the camp at Mir. Its colonel was Wincenty Krasinski and its four squadrons were commanded by Łubieński, Jan Kozietulski, Ignace Stolowski and Henri Kamienski. After Pułtusk Łubieński was awarded the Légion d'honneur and in 1808 he fought at Somosierra, supporting the final phase of the assault. He and his regiment fought in the Peninsular War before he returned to Paris in January 1809. On 5 April 1809 he received the cross of a Grand Officer of the Légion d’honneur. In the 1809 campaign he fought at Essling on 22 May and Wagram (6 July) and to reward his courage Napoleon made him a Baron de l'Empire with a pension of 4,000 francs, later increased to 6,000 francs. In 1810, a few months after retiring to Warsaw, he received the order of Virtuti Militari. Following a disagreement with the regiment's commander, Krasiński, Łubieński was dismissed. At the start of 1811 he was sent to Segan with the Legion of the Vistula (Legia Nadwislańska), one of the largest Polish foreign legions of the Napoleonic era, which was renamed the 8th Uhlan Regiment (8éme régiment de Uhlans). In March 1812 Łubieński led his regiment to Berlin, Grudziądz, Wystruć, and Vilnius to fight in various Polish campaigns.

Remaining in reserve with the regiment commanded by marshal Nicolas Charles Oudinot, Łubieński and his men suffered heavy losses guarding the French army at the crossing of the Berezina. At the end of 1812, Łubieński returned to Warsaw to rest and in 1813 fought at Dresden, Kulm, Leipzig and Hanau. In January 1814 he was discharged by the French, becoming commander-in-chief of the Polish army. In that post Napoleon put him in charge of allotting salaries and subsidies to Polish soldiers. He received the Order of Saint Stanislas 2nd class. After the Russian takeover and as he could not agree with Grand Duke Constantine Pavlovich of Russia, he was relieved of the role of commander-in-chief in 1816.

Łubieński and several of his brothers set up the Łubieński Brothers enterprise, building its first factory in Warsaw in 1827 in the Guzowska Ruda region (now Żyrardów, Masovian Voivodeship). This became the first industrial factory in a rural area. Between 1825 and 1828 he was a justice of the peace for the Chełm district and between 1820 and 1825 a senator in the Sejm.

=== November Uprising ===
On 29 November 1830 the Poles began the November Uprising against their Russian occupiers. On 10 February 1831 Łubieński was made commander of the 2nd Cavalry Corps, made up of 33 battalions and 16 cannon. After the First Battle of Wawer, he and his corps did not fight despite receiving orders to do so, due to what he felt was the overwhelming numerical superiority of the Russian forces. Józef Chłopicki and Ignacy Prądzyński accused him of treason and ruining the last chance of a victory by refusing to obey an order to attack with his cavalry at Olszynka Grochowska. Historians have justified his disobedience as a good decision since sacrificing his cavalry could not have changed the course of the battle.

On 1 June Łubieński was promoted to lieutenant-general and chief-of-staff. This position involved organising and supplying the main Polish towns and cities. On 19 August he put up major resistance to the Russian advance on Warsaw under Ivan Paskevich, successor to marshal Diebitch, field-marshal of the Russian army and lieutenant of the Kingdom of Poland, who had died of cholera. At Warsaw, Łubieński was put in charge of resupplying the city without being told of the Russians' numerical superiority. Members of the city's Patriotic Association and others of his political opponents fiercely criticised him and his actions, accusing him of sabotaging the uprising.

Łubieński was diplomatic with his opponents, although on 28 September, he got general Maciej Rybiński dismissed upon accusations of entering negotiations with Paskevich for a Polish surrender. Three days later Łubieński returned to find Warsaw occupied by the Russians and he and the other Polish generals were condemned to exile in Russia. Due to his past exploits and thanks to his understanding of the Polish political situation, he won an audience with Tsar Nicholas I of Russia on 24 November 1831 in Moscow. He then 'collaborated' as a deputy in the Saint Petersburg diet from 1832 to 1834 while looking after the interests of the Łubieński brothers' business in the chamber of commerce and working mainly to regain lands and assets confiscated from Polish insurgents.

=== Businessman ===
Tomasz and his brothers entered an industrial partnership, Bracia Łubieńscy SA, in the 1820s that was involved in steel production, sugar, textile manufacture and eventually railways and a department store. In 1839 he travelled to London to gain financial aid for his metallurgical business. In 1840 and 1841 he was the director of works on the project to build a rail route from Warsaw to Vienna, commissioned by the Polish railways. He retired from active life to Warsaw after his brother, Henryk's financial difficulties: he had been charged with alleged bank fraud (misappropriating public funds for personal use) and convicted to 4 years in prison. To save his brother's and the family's honour, Tomasz covered Henryk's debts to financiers. Tomasz spent his retirement in Warsaw, becoming the president of "Resursa Kupiecka" (chamber of commerce), a member of the Chamber of Agriculture and a Catholic conservative senator for the town of Stary Sącz.

== Honours and decorations ==
- Baron de l'Empire (1810)
- Virtuti Militari (1810)
- Order of Saint Stanislaus 2nd class (1814)
- Commander of the Legion of Honour Légion d'honneur (1858)
- Médaille de Sainte-Hélène (1858)
