= Tekla Teresa Łubieńska =

Polish writer

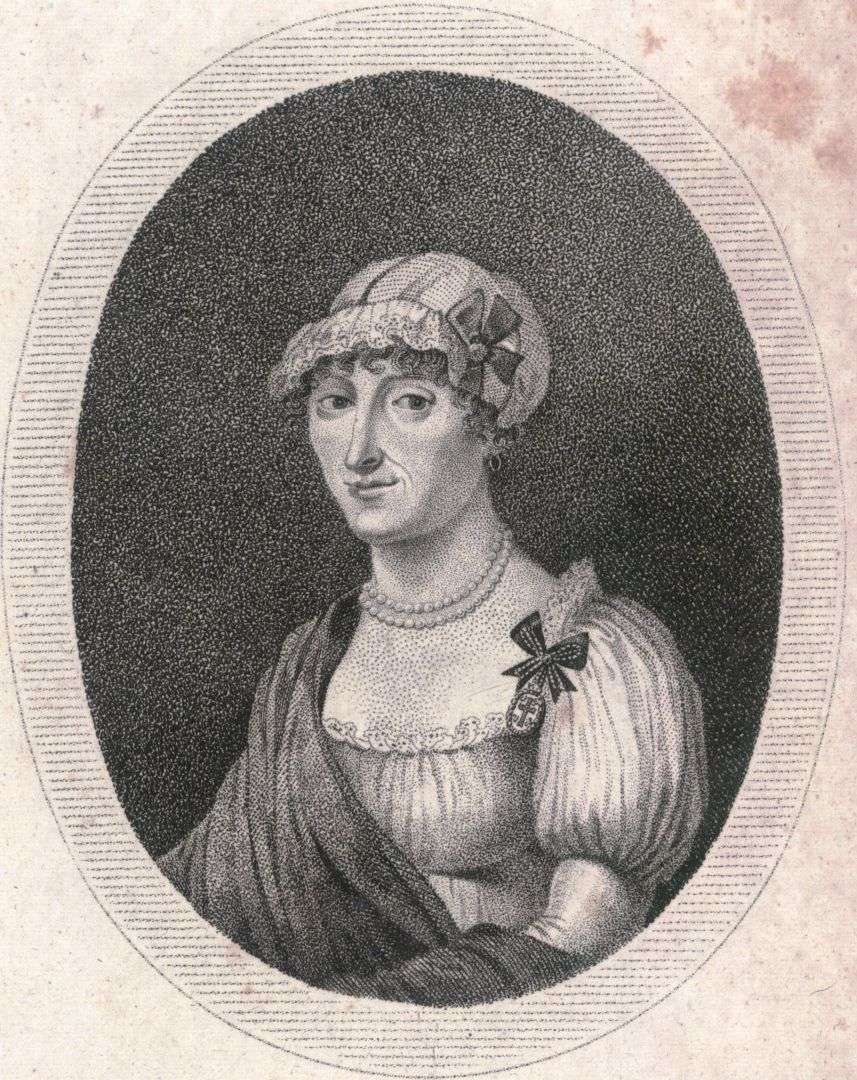
- Łubieńska, c. 1800
- Born: Tekla Teresa Bielińska; 6 June 1767; Warsaw Poland
- Died: 15 August 1810 (aged 43); Kraków, Congress Poland,
- Occupations: Writer, dramatist, translator
- Spouse: Count Feliks Walezejusz Łubieński
- Children: Franciszek, Tomasz Lubienski, Henryk, Tadeusz, Julian, Jan, Józef, Maria, Paulina, Rozalia
- Writing career
- Genres: Fiction, dramatic fiction, Lyrical poetry, translations of Jean Racine and Voltaire
- Notable works: 'Charlemagne and Wedekind'

Tekla Teresa Łubieńska (née Bielińska; 6 June 1767, Warsaw – August 1810, Kraków) was a Polish playwright, poet and translator.

== Biography ==
Łubieńska was the daughter of Polish nobles, Franciszek Bieliński (nephew and adopted son of Franciszek Bieliński), court writer and senator for Czersk and his wife, Krystyna Justyna Sanguszko. She was taught at home. At age of 11 in 1778 she lost her mother. From then on, she was in the care of the duchess, Barbara Sanguszko, her maternal grandmother who gave her a French education. She later married, as his second wife, Feliks Łubieński, a future Minister of Justice in Congress Poland. They had ten children, among them, Tomasz and Henryk. While Tekla's husband was involved in the turbulent politics of the Targowica Confederation, she left pregnant for Prague with her children. On her return to Poland in 1785, she settled in the family estate in Guzów and devoted herself to family life, child-bearing and her writing. She died suddenly at the early age of just 43, in Kraków in August 1810. She is an ancestor of British actor, Rula Lenska.

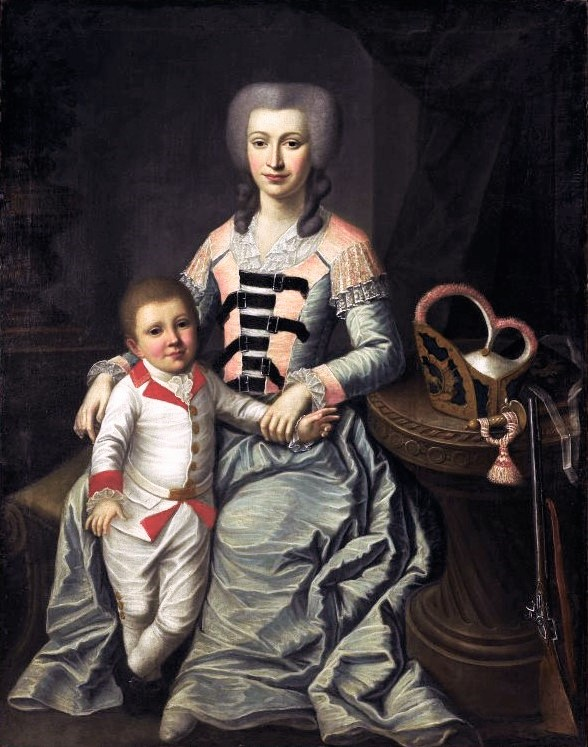
Tekla Teresa Łubieńska with her eldest son, Franciszek

== Writings ==
At the time of the Four-Year Sejm she wrote patriotic verse. Initially, she devoted herself to writing chiefly comedies, including dramatic diversions for children. She later produced historical dramas such as: Wanda, queen of Poland (1806), Charlemagne and Wedekind (1807), a two-act drama in verse. She translated works by Jean Racine and Voltaire.

=== Notable works ===
- Lyrical poetry, as yet unpublished but referenced by H. Skimborowicz, "Zorza" 1843; S. z Ż. P. (Pruszakowa), "Tygodnik Ilustrowany" 1863, nr 191-192, (according to Skimborowicz: Many prayers written by her in verse appear in recently published devotional literature but without her signature.)
- Wanda. A tragedy in 5 Acts, published 2 March 1806, and produced on stage in Warsaw on 17 April 1807,
- Charlemagne and Wedekind, an historical drama set to music by J. Elsner, first produced in the National Theatre on 5 December 1807..., Warsaw 1808 (2 editions)
- A response in verse to Ludwik Osiński, in answer to his poem addressed to Countess Lubienska as a paean on her patron saint's day

=== Translations ===
- Elfryda. Tragedia na wzór dramatów greckich, z angielskiego – Elfreda. A tragedy in the mode of Greek dramas, from the English, unpublished
- P. A. Metastasio: Siroe, unpublished
- J. Racine: Andromaque, unpublished
- Wzór męża i ojca. Komedia z francuskiego, The example of a husband and father, a farce from the French, unpublished
- Voltaire: Candide, unpublished.

According to Skimborowicz: Polish theatre owes [Tekla] several translations of Voltaire's plays, but he fails to mention which ones. An extract of a translated poem by Frenchman, A. Deshoulières is acknowledged as Tekla's by the Warsaw Illustrated weekly in 1863.

=== Letters ===
- To her son, Tomasz, from 14 June 1806.

== Bibliography ==
- Polski Słownik Biograficzny Vol. XVIII (1973)
- Bibliografia Literatury Polskiej – Nowy Korbut Vol. 5: Oświecenie, published by Państwowy Instytut Wydawniczy, Warsaw, 1967 pages 276–277 – A Bibliography of Polish Literature, vol. 5. The Enlightenment.

== See also ==
- Feliks Sobański
- Theodore de Korwin Szymanowski
- Bernard Łubieński
- Witold Dzierżykraj-Morawski
- Rula Lenska
