= Maria Magdalena Łubieńska =

Polish artist (1833–1920)

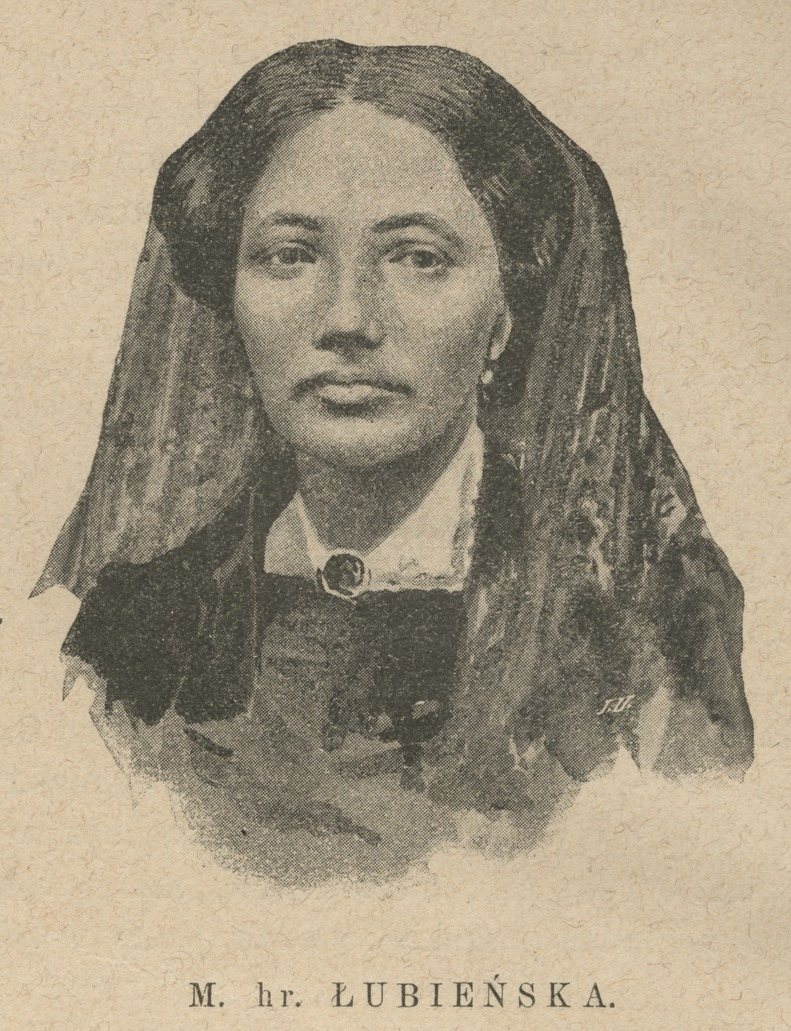
Maria Magdalena Łubieńska

Maria Magdalena Łubieńska, also known as Countess Łubieńska (1833–1920) was a Polish artist and educator, of noble descent.

== Life and career ==
Łubieńska was born in 1833, one of ten children of landowner and entrepreneur Henryk Łubieński and his wife, Irena (née Potocka). She was home educated. At age 22, she married her cousin, Paweł Łubieński, who had had one previous marriage, and together they had five children. As well as drawing, she painted in watercolour and oil. It was common for Polish noblewomen of the time to learn skills in art and craft making, however most discontinued the practice after marriage, unless life circumstances forced it as a livelihood.

Łubieńska founded her School of Drawing and Painting, in operation between 1867 and approx. 1910. It became famous for the production of stained glass, which was often installed in Gothic Revival churches in the Kingdom of Poland, but also in the Partitions of Poland and in the depths of Russia.

Łubieńska died in 1920.

== See also ==
- List of Polish women artists
- Łubieński family
