= Bernard Łubieński =

Polish religious priest (1846–1933)

Venerable Bernard Łubieński CSsR
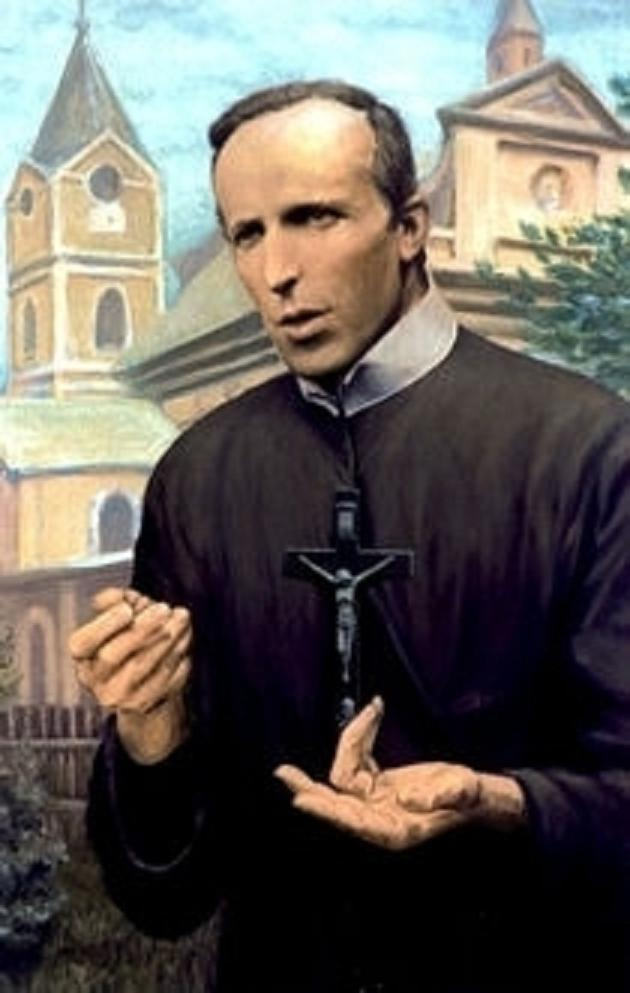
- Born: 9 December 1846; Guzów, Poland
- Died: 10 September 1933 (aged 86); Warsaw, Poland

Orders
- Ordination: 29 December 1870

Personal details
- Denomination: Roman Catholicism

Bernard Łubieński, CSsR, (9 December 1846 – 10 September 1933) was a Polish Redemptorist priest, missionary and writer, closely associated with Bishop Robert Coffin and with the Roman Catholic Church in England, where he spent his youth and early career. He was a member of the Redemptorist convent at St Mary's Roman Catholic Church, Clapham in London before returning to Poland in the 1880s to join in re-establishing his congregation over there with the help of his family. He is currently the subject of a beatification process.

== Early life ==
Łubieński was the second of twelve children born in Guzów, Poland, to Count Tomasz Wentworth Łubieński, Pomian coat of arms, and Adelajda, née Łempicka, members of a prolific and entrepreneurial Polish szlachta family, once considered magnates. He was the great grandson of Justice Minister and family patriarch, Felix Hr. Łubieński (1758-1848) and his writer wife, Tekla Teresa Łubieńska (1767-1810), who had wrested back the vast Guzów estate from Prussian state sequestration after the third Partition of Poland, gaining a Prussian title in the process. He was moreover the grandson of the anglophile Henryk Łubieński, industrialist, financier and co-founder of the Mill town of Zyrardów. His siblings were, Henryk, Zofia, Roger, Maria, Zygmunt, Adam, Michał, Irena, Celina, Teresa and Tomasz.

At around the age of six, Łubieński was farmed out to his father's pious relatives, Maria (née Łubieńska) and Felix Szymanowski, who had recently lost an infant son and was raised together with their surviving son, Teodor who was a few months older than Bernard. The children were home schooled in Warsaw and Cygów until the age of eleven, when in the autumn of 1858 Bernard and his older brother, Henryk, were sent to an English Catholic boarding school, Ushaw College in County Durham. There were relatives in Herefordshire, as a cousin of their father's, Irena Dzierżykraj-Morawska, had come from Poland to marry Charles de La Barre Bodenham, from an ancient English recusant family, so that the Łubieński boys were able to visit them at their stately home, "Rotherwas Court".

== Religious life ==
Łubieński was an indifferent scholar towards the end of his time at St. Cuthbert's where he failed to gain his school leaving certificate. This probably affected his initiative to join the Society of Jesus having attended a retreat at Manresa House, Roehampton led by Alfred Weld, from 30 August to 5 September 1964, after which his application was declined by the congregation. Much to the disapproval of his father (and of an uncle who was a bishop, pl:Konstanty Ireneusz Łubieński), Łubieński became a postulant in the Clapham Redemptorist community in 1864 and then entered their novitiate in England. After theological and philosophical studies in Witten, Netherlands, he was finally ordained in Aachen in Germany in 1870. He returned to England and went to Clapham to do pastoral work and look after Polish exiles in London. He travelled to Perth, Scotland to train in missionary work, visited Ireland and attended courses in Bishop Eton, in Liverpool while ministering to local people. In England, he worked as an archivist for the congregation and rose to be the Provincial bursar. In 1879 his brother, Roger, invited him on a furlough visit to Poland where he met the Austrian Redemptorist Provincial, who had been previously contacted by Łubieński's English provincial, Robert Coffin. Between them, they agreed that the congregatiaon should expand its mission back into Poland. The Redemptorists had been expulsed from the Grand Duchy of Warsaw by Napoleon in 1809.

In 1881 a former Dominican monastery was bought in Mościski, Przemyśl diocese, by the Austrian province of the Redemptorists. In 1882 having closed down his affairs in London, Łubieński returned to Poland — via Rome where twice he was granted an audience with Pope Leo XIII - after a 25-year absence, to participate in the re-introduction of the Polish Province of the Redemptorists and to be nearer to his large extended family. In 1885 he succumbed to influenza accompanied by paralysis, which after treatment, left him lame for the rest of his life. He was offered the See of Mohilev, but turned it down on grounds of poor health and because of his inclination for holding retreats, missionary work and writing. In any event, he identified strongly with the simple life of the French priest, Jean Vianney. He led retreats for all sections of society, including priests and religious. He became a respected and sought-after preacher and, as a descendant of a family of past Polish Primates, is said to have spiritually influenced four successive future Primates of Poland, (1900-1948). By the end of his ministry he is said to have conducted 244 missionary trips across all three Partitions of Poland, 508 retreats and refurbished 54 churches and built two. After his death in Warsaw, aged 86, those close to him opined that he had died in the odour of sanctity.

== Beatification process ==
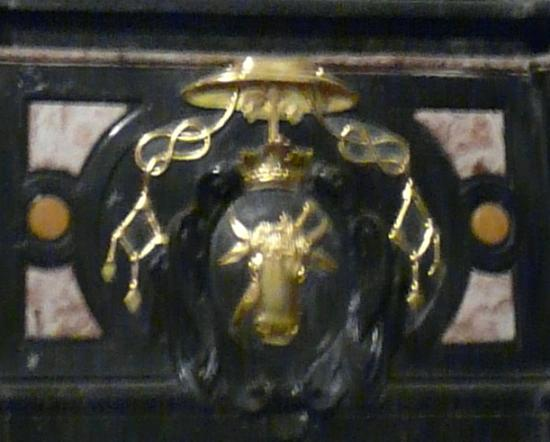
Pomian CoA on sarcophagus of Maciej Łubieński, Primate, in Gniezno Cathedral

Persuaded of the heroic virtue of his life, the Redemptorist fathers initiated the ecclesiastical process in the cause of Łubieński's beatification. On 2 June 1961 the requisite investigative stage began, terminating at the level of the Archdiocese of Warsaw on 24 November 1965. In the course of the inquiry, submissions were received from 44 witnesses. After many changes, Antonio Marrazza was named postulator of the cause. A special Historical Commission was called upon to gather material. Concluding its work on 28 March 1995, the Commission passed its findings to the Congregation for the Causes of Saints in Rome. On 30 March 1998 the Congregation issued a decree validating the diocesan stage of the inquiry. At the end of January 2005 a Positio petition, containing a detailed biography and bibliography with theological opinions, was handed to the Holy See. On 12 April 2005 a consultative college met and accepted the validity of the historical material.

On 6 March 2018 Pope Francis promulgated a decree confirming the heroic nature of Łubieński's heroic virtue.

== See also ==
- Poles in the United Kingdom

== Bibliography ==
(In Polish)

- Polski Słownik Biograficzny vol. XVIII (1973) - Polish Dictionary of Biography which has an entry on Bernard Łubieński.
- O. Bernard Łubieński Wspomnienia (autobiography) ed. Sławomir Pawłowicz CSsR, Wyd. Homo Dei, Kraków 2009, ISBN 978-83-60998-41-0.
- Encyklopedia katolicka vol. XI, publ. Katolicki Uniwersytet Lubelski Jana Pawła II, (Catholic University of Lublin), Lublin 2006
- Marian Pirożyński CSsR,O. Bernard Łubieński (1846-1933), nakładem O.O. Redemptorystów, Wrocław, 1946
- "Dzień modlitw o beatyfikację o. Bernarda Łubieńskiego". redemptor.pl. 13 September 2009.
- o. Paweł Drobot CSsR – Sługa Boży O. Bernard Łubieński newsletter piece about Servant of God, Fr. Łubieński.
- o. Sylwester Cabała CSsR – SŁUGA BOŻY BERNARD ŁUBIEŃSKI newsletter piece about Łubieński's beatification candidacy.
