= Henryk Łubieński =

Polish businessman

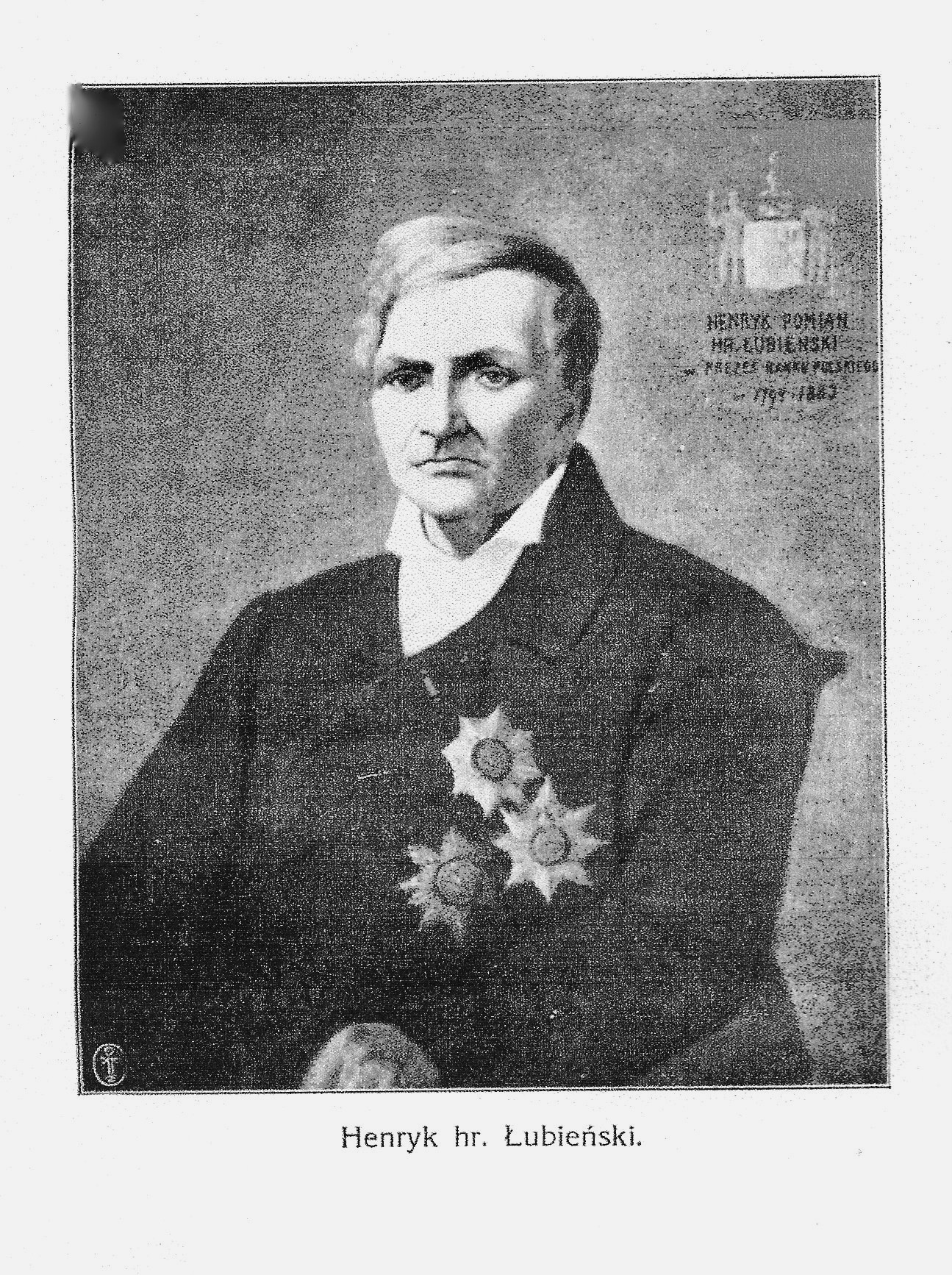
- Łubieński in c. 1855
- Born: Henryk Jan Nepomucen Łubieński; 11 July 1793; Prague, Habsburg monarchy
- Died: 17 September 1883 (aged 90); Wiskitki, Congress Poland
- Education: Warsaw University Master at Law (1816)
- Occupations: Business magnate, banker, economist
- Known for: Early industrialism in Congress Poland
- Spouse: Irena Potocka
- Parent(s): Feliks Lubienski; Tekla Teresa Bielińska
- Relatives: Tomasz Lubienski (brother); Bernard Łubieński (grandson); Théodore de Korwin Szymanowski (great-nephew)

Henryk Jan Nepomucen Łubieński, Pomian coat of arms (11 July 1793 – 17 September 1883), was the scion of a Polish magnate family, landowner, financier, lawyer, early industrialist, economic activist, and co-founder of the Towarzystwo Kredytowe Ziemskie w Królestwie Polskim, a banking credit institution in Congress Poland. He was elected to the Sejm of Congress Poland and became a government counsel. He rose to the rank of vice president of Bank Polski, the national bank of Poland during the Kingdom of Poland. He was one of the co-founders of the Mill town of Żyrardów and its textile industry in 1832 and a participant in the creation a new industrial and rail infrastructure in Poland.

He is considered an economic pioneer and visionary, along with several of his brothers, in welcoming the Industrial Revolution, through their own entrepreneurial initiatives into their then partitioned, occupied and agrarian country during the first half of the 19th century. Łubieński's brilliant industrial career and activism came to an abrupt end in 1842, when he was arrested and charged with misappropriating public funds for personal use. It is said that the charges were entirely politically motivated by the then occupying authorities. In 1848 the year his own father died, he was finally convicted and sent into Russian exile in Kursk for six years. On his return to Poland, a victim of Russian political repression, he never again participated in public life.

== Background ==
He was born in Pragueamid profound political turbulence in his nation, while his mother had sought sanctuary with her young family in the Czech capital, and his father was engrossed in affairs of state in Poland. He was the seventh of ten children and fifth of seven sons of two well connected Polish nobles, Tekla Teresa Łubieńska, a writer and dramatist and Felix Łubieński, a jurist and future minister of justice in the Duchy of Warsaw, soon (1796) to be granted the hereditary title of count by Frederick Wilhelm III of Prussia.

All the Łubieński's siblings survived into adulthood. They were, brothers: Franciszek, Tomasz Łubieński, Piotr, Tadeusz, Jan, Józef and sisters: Maria Skarżyńska, Paulina Morawska and Róża Sobańska, known as "The Siberian rose" for her charitable work and wife of a Siberian exile and mother of the philanthropist, Feliks Sobański. After home tutoring, Henryk entered the Warsaw law school founded by his father in 1808. Having completed his studies there, he continued law studies in Paris. He returned to Poland aged 25 and married Irena Potocka. He bought his eldest brother's estate at Kazimierza Wielka and in 1818 he settled there with his wife for a time. There he planned his first sugar processing plant, a project brought to fruition by one of his nephews, Kazimierz. In 1820 he was appointed counsel to his voivodeship and completed a higher law degree at Warsaw University in 1826.

== Career ==
His property portfolio was extensive and scattered: he owned estates in Częstocice, Wiskitki, Guzów, Kazimierza Wielka, Ostrowiec Świętokrzyski, Firlej Lublin Voivodeship and Lubartów. He collaborated in a great range of industrial and business start-ups. He initiated coal mining at Huta Bankowa in Dąbrowa Górnicza with a capital loan from the Bank Polski. Incidentally, the bronze cast memorial to him with his bust, unveiled in 1839, was the first such casting made in Poland from a coal fired Smelting at Huta Bankowa.

He founded the Sugar factory at Guzów in 1829 and another sugar plant at Częstocice in 1839. While at Lubartów he started a Ceramics factory to produce Fayence china, the beginning of that particular industry in the area. His own firm lasted ten years from 1840 to 1850. In the same voivodeship at Firlej, he opened the first Ironworks near the mineral quarry at the village of Serock. Thus he was able to initiate the first local metal production line for agricultural machinery and implements, including scythes. He also opened factories at Żyrardów, Starachowice and in Ostrowiec Świętokrzyski.

In 1829, he became a director of Bank Polski, and then between 1832 and 1842, he rose to be its vice president. In 1830, with his older brother, Tomasz he opened a department store, Bracia Łubieńscy i Spółka – "Łubieński Brothers and Partners". The store developed fortuitously just as the November Uprising was in preparation and they were able to import armaments and military equipment from the United Kingdom. At the same time, Henryk Ł. opened a factory to make gunpowder and Saltpeter, and tailoring workshops and a shoe factory to produce military boots.

Having organised mining and metalwork, in 1835 Łubieński now turned his attention to building a railway joining Warsaw with Zaglebie Dabrowskie, in outline essentially what was to become the Warsaw–Vienna railway line.

== Arrest and exile ==
In 1842, he and Józef Lubowidzki president of Bank Polski were charged with misappropriating public funds for personal use. They denied and resisted these accusations which brought scandal and shame upon them and their illustrious families. The court case lasted six years. Finally, in 1848, the year the Łubieński clan patriarch, Felix Walezjusz, died in his 90th year, Henryk Łubieński was convicted and sentenced to a year in prison, but after interventions it was commuted to exile in Kursk for five years. His brother, Tomasz, raised the funds to pay off the creditors and buy his conditional release and was able to bring him back home. He returned to Poland in 1853 but he played no further significant role in the economic development of his country. Henryk died, like his father, aged 90, and was buried in Wiskitki.

== Personal life ==
He married Irena Potocka with whom he had two daughters who included Maria Magdalena Łubieńska, and eight sons, who included Edward, Tomasz Wentworth, Konstanty Ireneusz (later a bishop who died in Siberian exile), Julian, and Jan Nepomucen.

== Honours and decorations ==
For his role in the November Uprising, he was awarded:

- Virtuti Militari (1831), Class V Silver Cross
- Order of Saint Stanislaus (1831)
- Order of Saint Anna (1831)
