= Minoga =

- Village
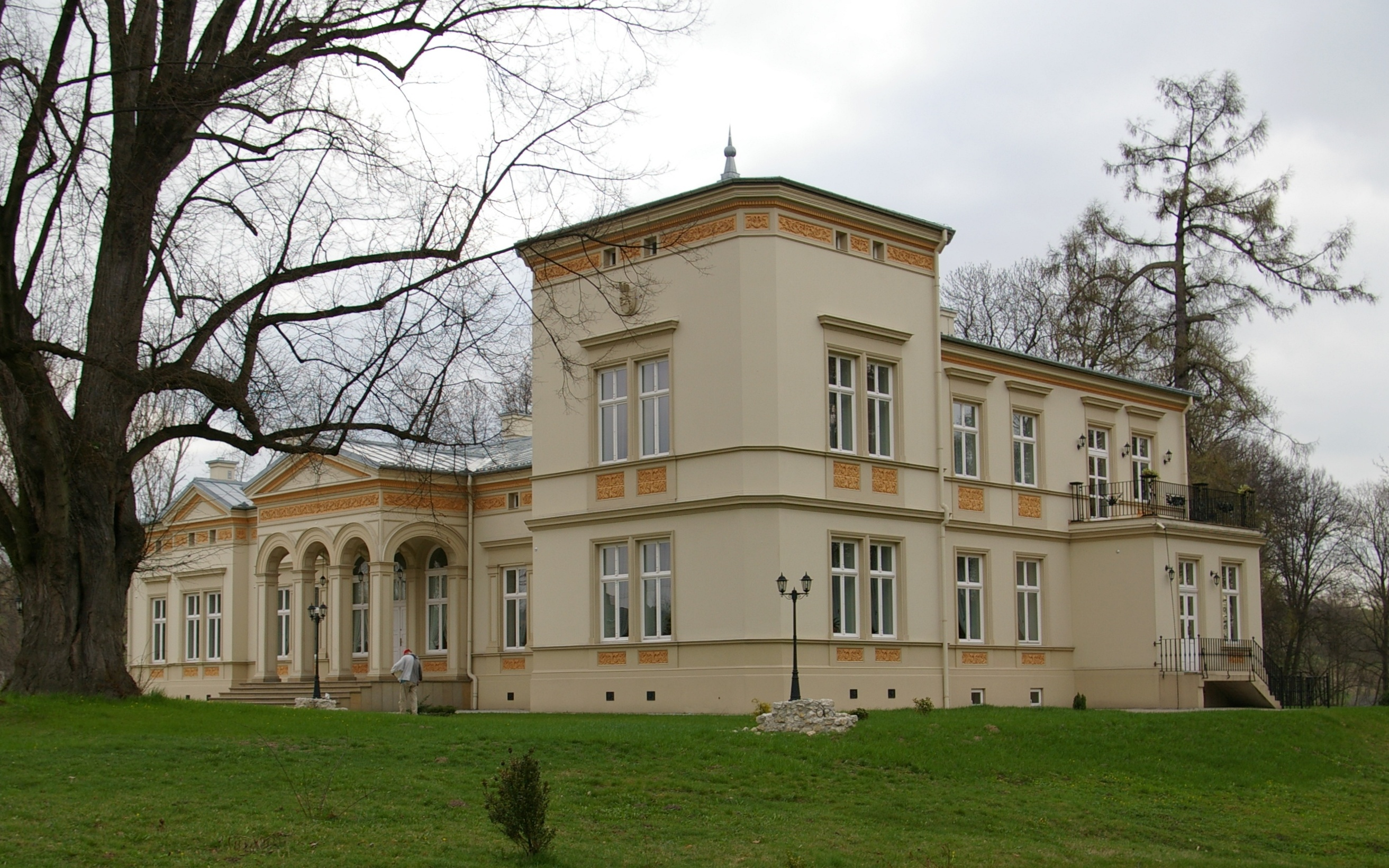
- Palace in Minoga

- Location within Poland
- Coordinates: 50°14′N 19°53′E
- Country: Poland
- Voivodeship: Lesser Poland
- County: Kraków
- Gmina: Skała

Minoga [miˈnɔɡa] is a village in the administrative district of Gmina Skała, within Kraków County, Lesser Poland Voivodeship, in southern Poland.
