= Szczytniki, Kalisz County =

Szczytniki
- Village
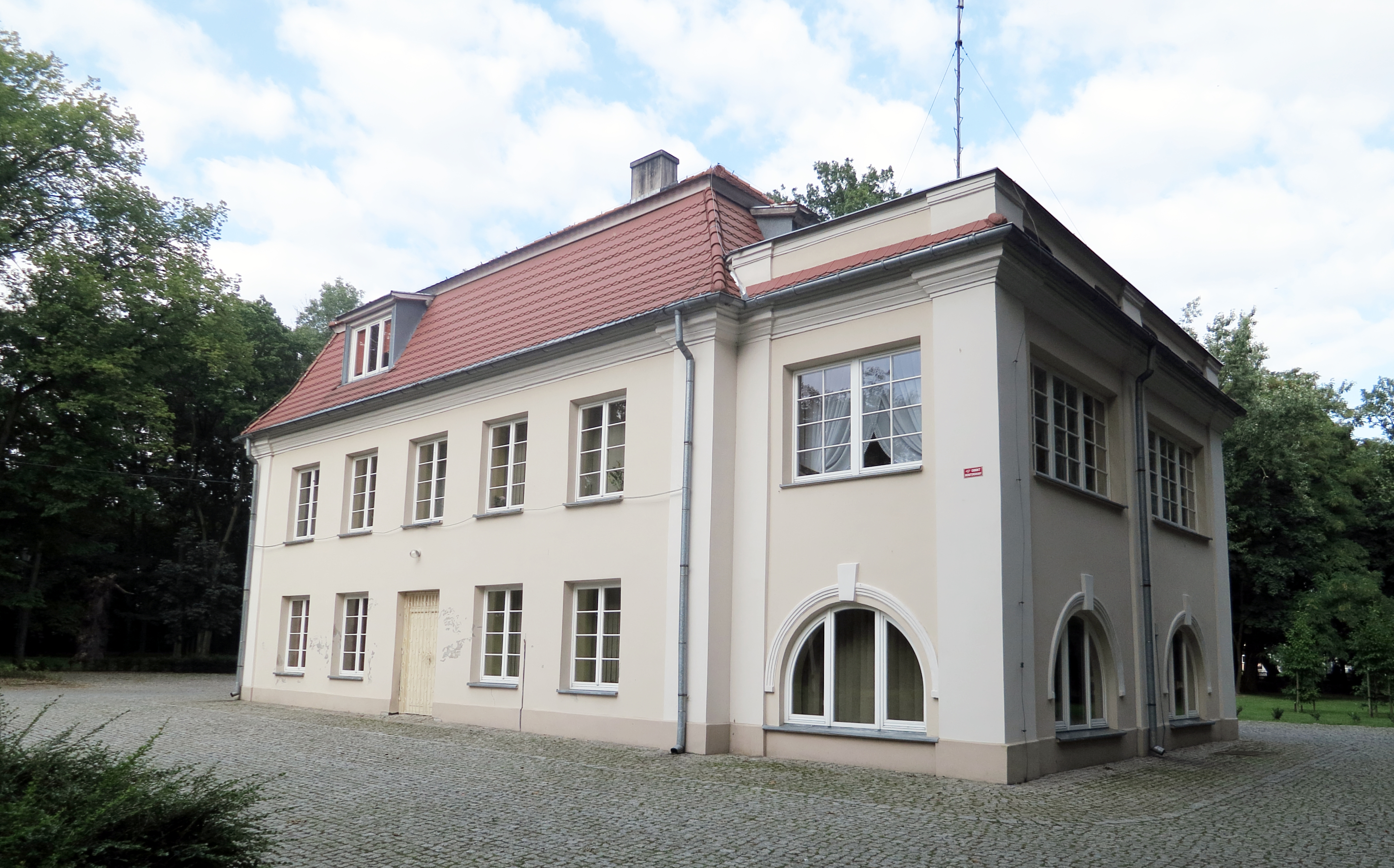
- Manor in Szczytniki

- Location within Poland
- Coordinates: 51°41′N 18°20′E
- Country: Poland
- Voivodeship: Greater Poland
- County: Kalisz
- Gmina: Szczytniki

Szczytniki [ʂt͡ʂɨtˈniki] is a village in Kalisz County, Greater Poland Voivodeship, in west-central Poland. It is the seat of the gmina (administrative district) called Gmina Szczytniki.

== Notable people ==
- Tomasz Łubieński, Polish general
