= Kalinowa, Sieradz County =

Kalinowa
- Village
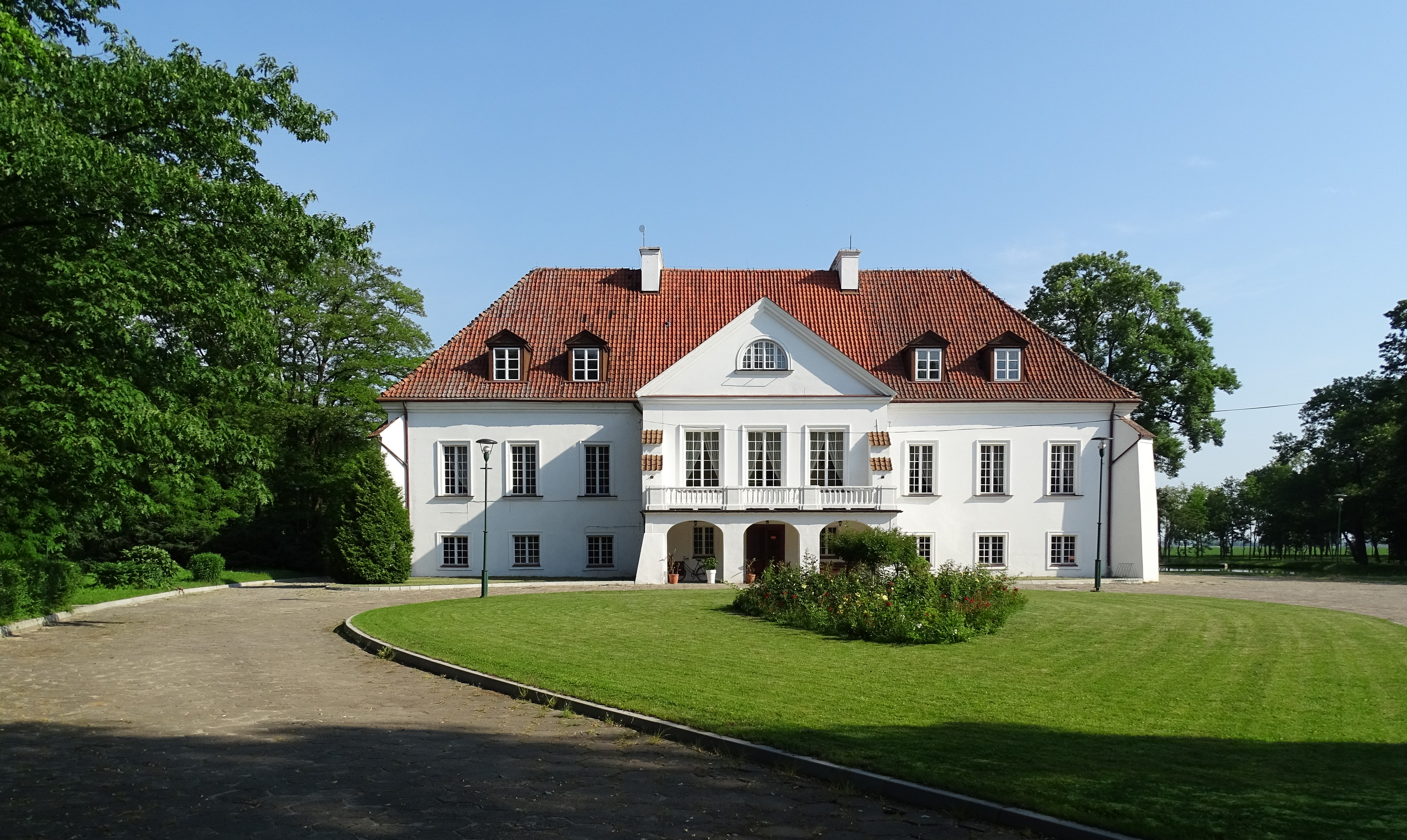
- The manor house from the first half of the 19th century

- Location within Poland
- Coordinates: 51°41′N 18°29′E
- Country: Poland
- Voivodeship: Łódź
- County: Sieradz
- Gmina: Błaszki

Kalinowa [kaliˈnɔva] is a village in the administrative district of Gmina Błaszki, within Sieradz County, Łódź Voivodeship, in central Poland.
