= Żyrardów =

City in Masovian Voivodeship, Poland

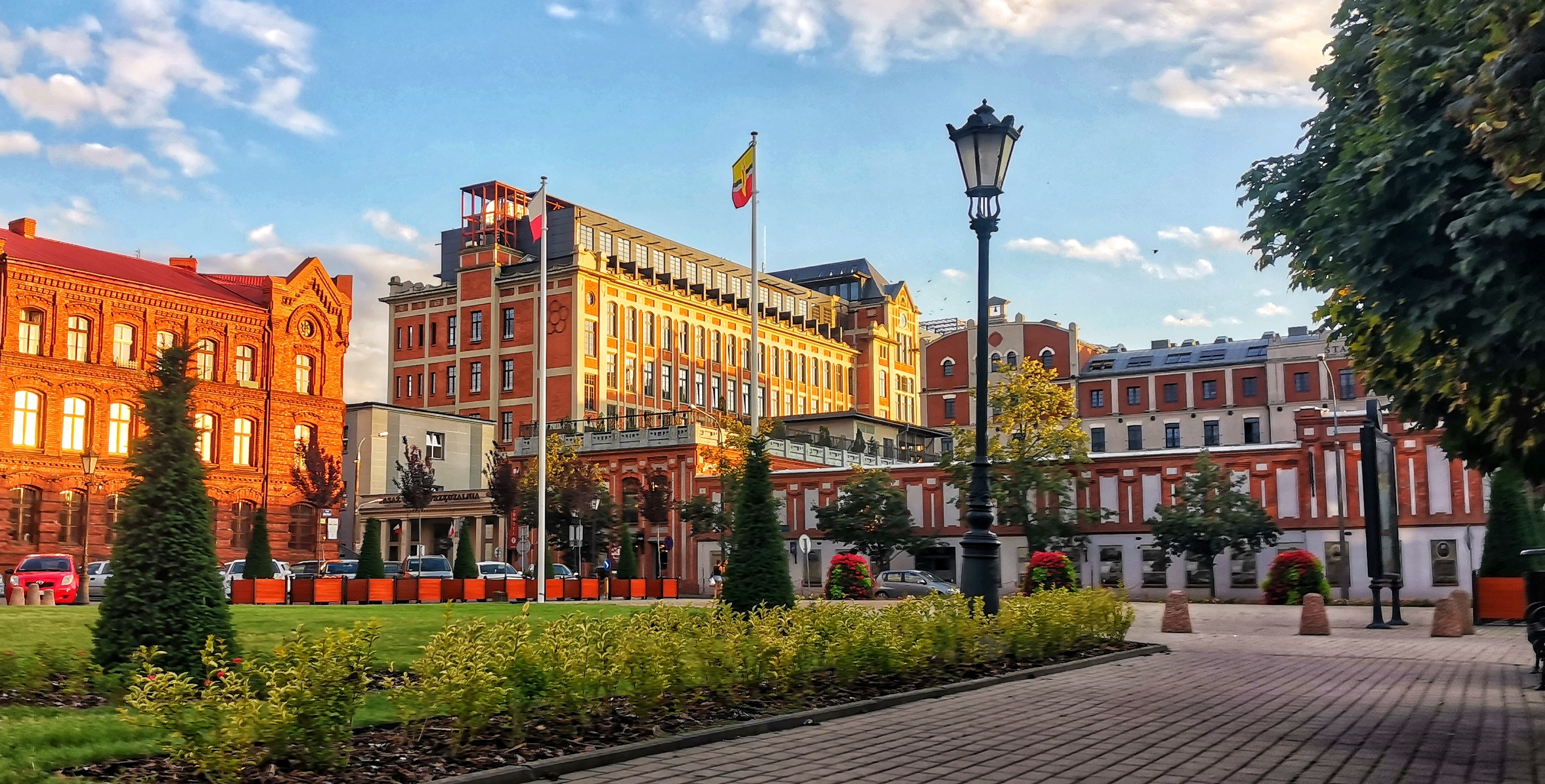
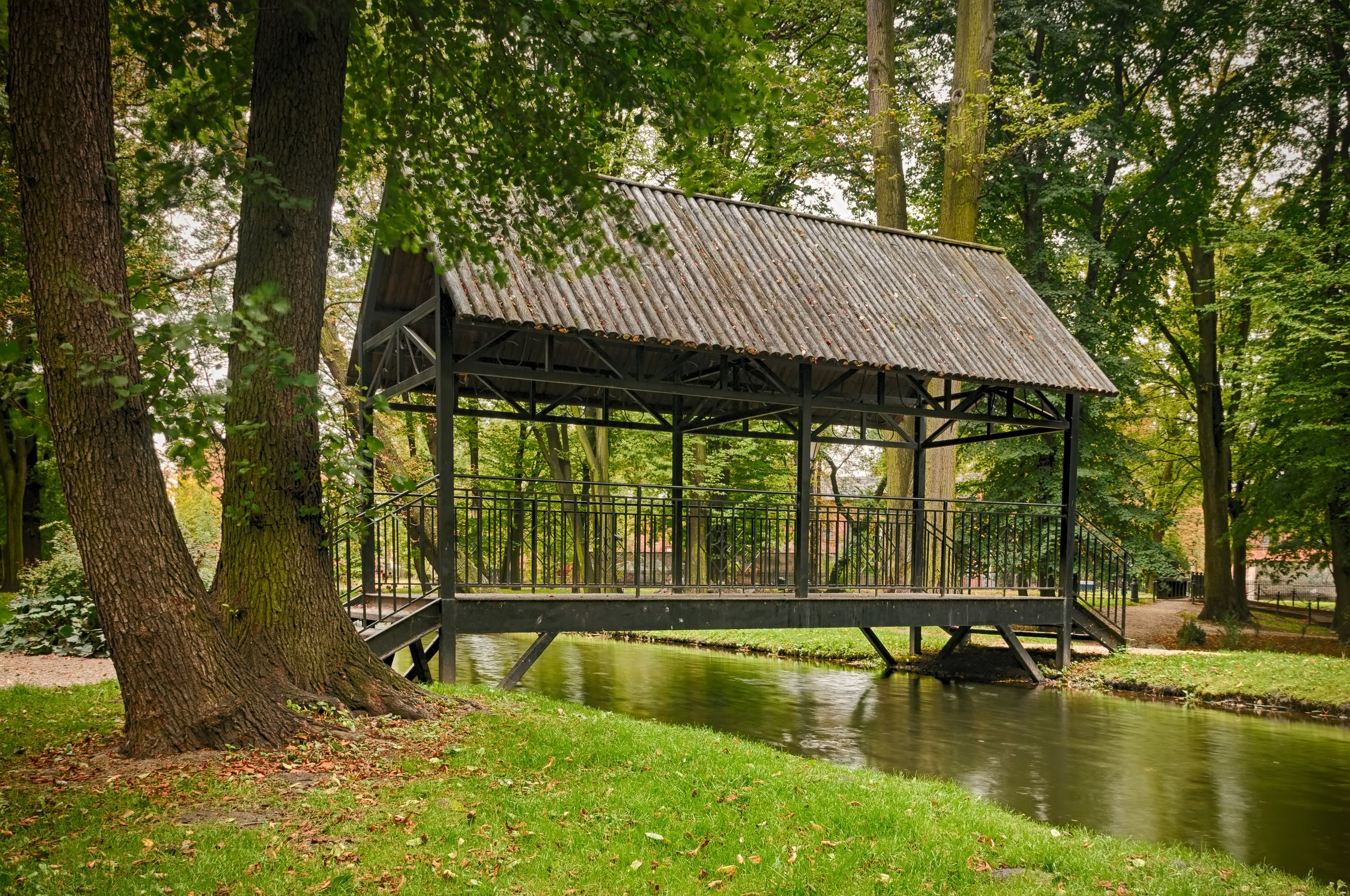
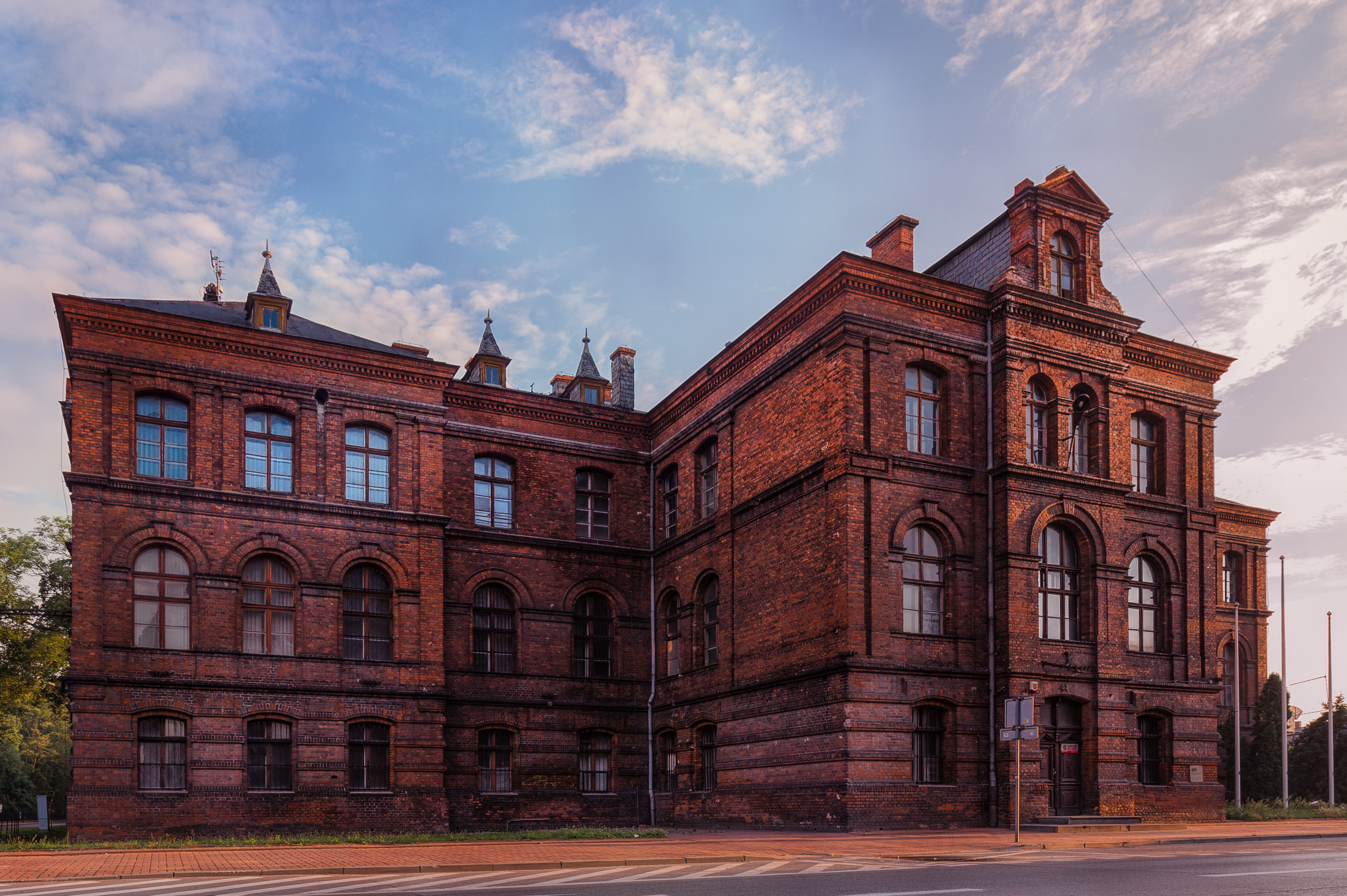
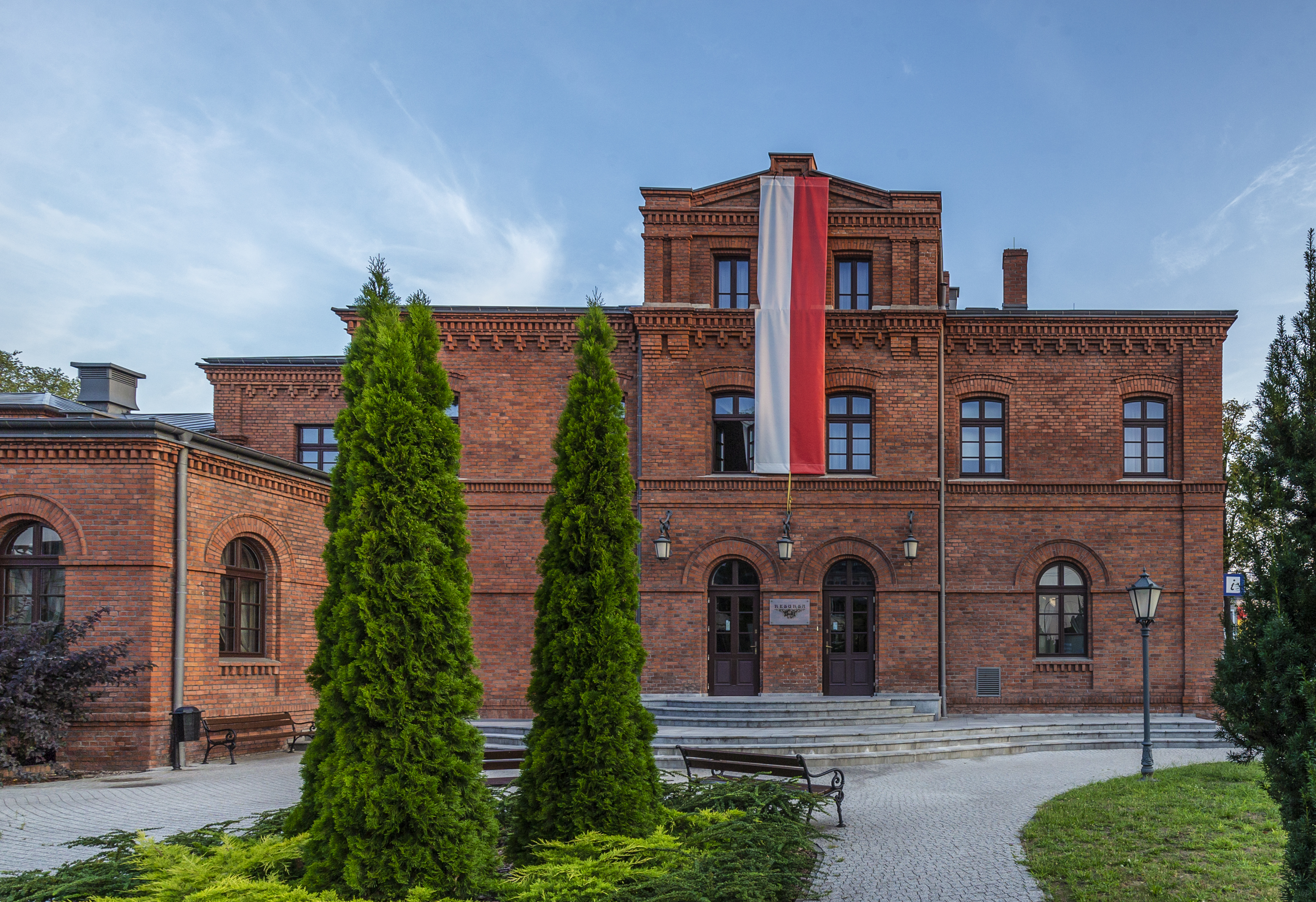
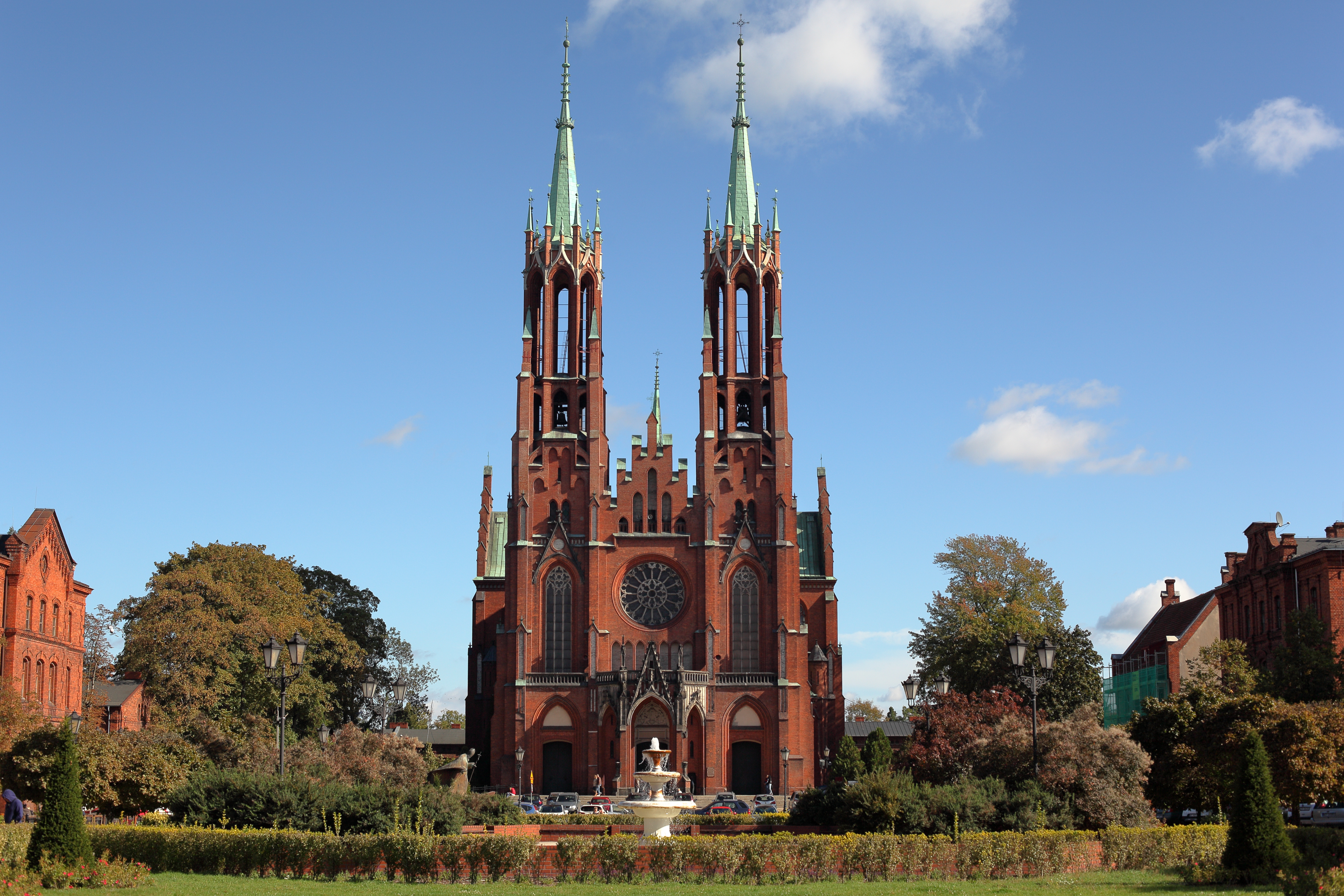
- John Paul II Square and the Old Spinning Plant City Park Kantor textile exchange Resursa Our Lady of Consolation Church

- Flag Coat of arms
- Nickname: Little Łódź
- Location within Masovian Voivodeship Location within Poland
- Coordinates: 52°3′N 20°26′E
- Country: Poland
- Voivodeship: Masovian
- County: Żyrardów County
- Gmina: Żyrardów (urban gmina)
- Established: 1830
- City rights: 1916
- Named for: Philippe de Girard

Government
  - City mayor: Lucjan Krzysztof Chrzanowski

Area
  - Total: 14.35 km^{2} (5.54 sq mi)

Population (2006)
  - Total: 41,161
  - Density: 2,868/km^{2} (7,429/sq mi)
- Time zone: UTC+1 (CET)
  - Summer (DST): UTC+2 (CEST)
- Postal code: 96-300
- Area code: +48 046
- Car plates: WZY
- Website: www.zyrardow.pl

Historic Monument of Poland
- Designated: 2012-01-04
- Part of: Żyrardów – 19th-century factory settlement
- Reference no.: Dz. U., 2012, No. 59

Żyrardów [ʐɨˈrarduf] is a city and former industrial hub in central Poland with approximately 41,400 inhabitants (2006). It is the capital of Żyrardów County in the Masovian Voivodeship, 45 kilometres (28 miles) west of Warsaw.

== Etymology ==
Żyrardów, initially a textile settlement, was named after French engineer and inventor Philippe de Girard, who worked in the area.

== History ==
=== Origins ===
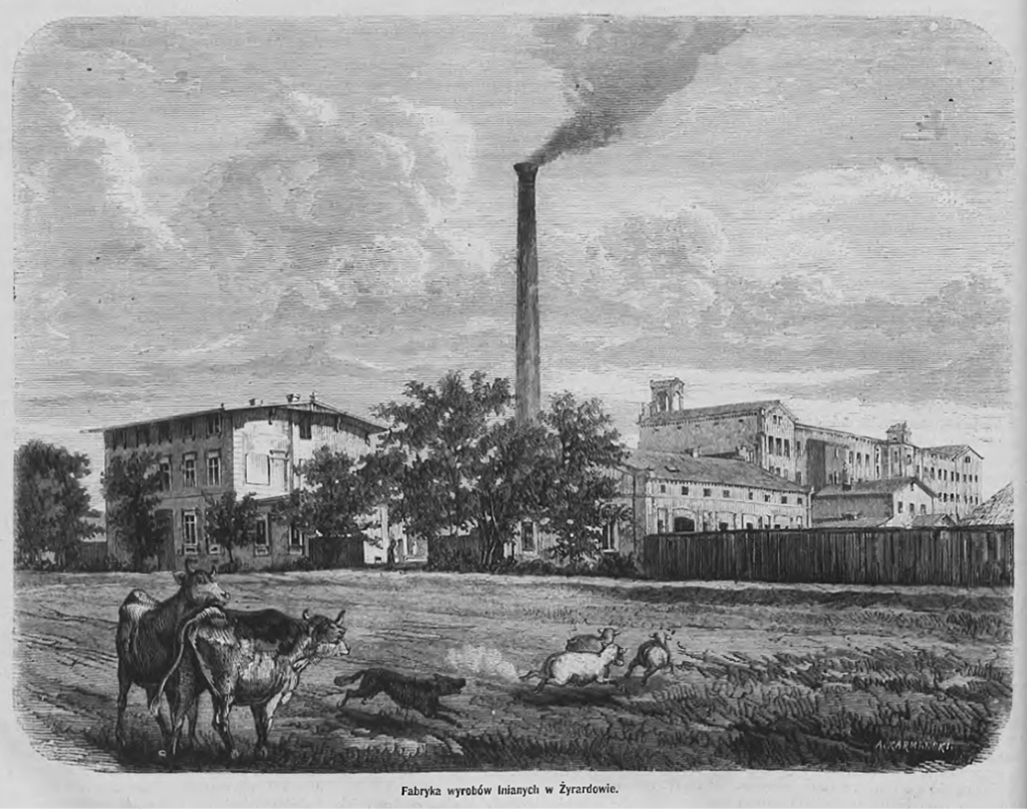
Textile factory in 1872

A textile factory founded by the Łubieński brothers opened in the village of Ruda Guzowska in 1833, after it was moved from Marymont. One of the directors of the factory was French inventor Philippe de Girard (from Lourmarin). The village developed during the 19th century into a significant textile mill town in Poland. In honour of Girard, Ruda Guzowska was renamed Żyrardów, a toponym derived of the polonised spelling of Girard's name.

Initially, the factory's founders provided workers with good social conditions. Five schools were built, a preschool for the workers' children, bathhouses and a modern hospital staffed by English doctors. In 1845, the Warsaw–Vienna railway was opened with a station in Żyrardów. In 1889, Żyrardów was visited by Shah Naser al-Din Shah Qajar of Iran.

=== Labour movement ===
The terrible working conditions and inequality of the cotton mills and textile industry in Żyrardów during the late 19th century, which was in Congress Poland (part of the Russian Empire) at the time, led to a massive strike started by the female workers employed there in 1883. This event is one of the largest and most important events in the early history of the Polish workers' movement, which focused on fighting against the colonial oppressors as well as liberating the workers of partitioned Poland. Troops were used to put down a strike in April 1883, resulting in several dead or wounded. The upheavals in Żyrardów were the largest protest in Poland up until the Łódź insurrection of the 1905 Revolution. They remain an essential element of Polish working class history, with various forms of media dedicated to them as well as street reenactments performed annually since 2004.

In the 1921 census, 90.8% of the population declared Polish nationality, 7.5% Jewish, 1.2% German, 0.22% Czech.

=== World War II ===
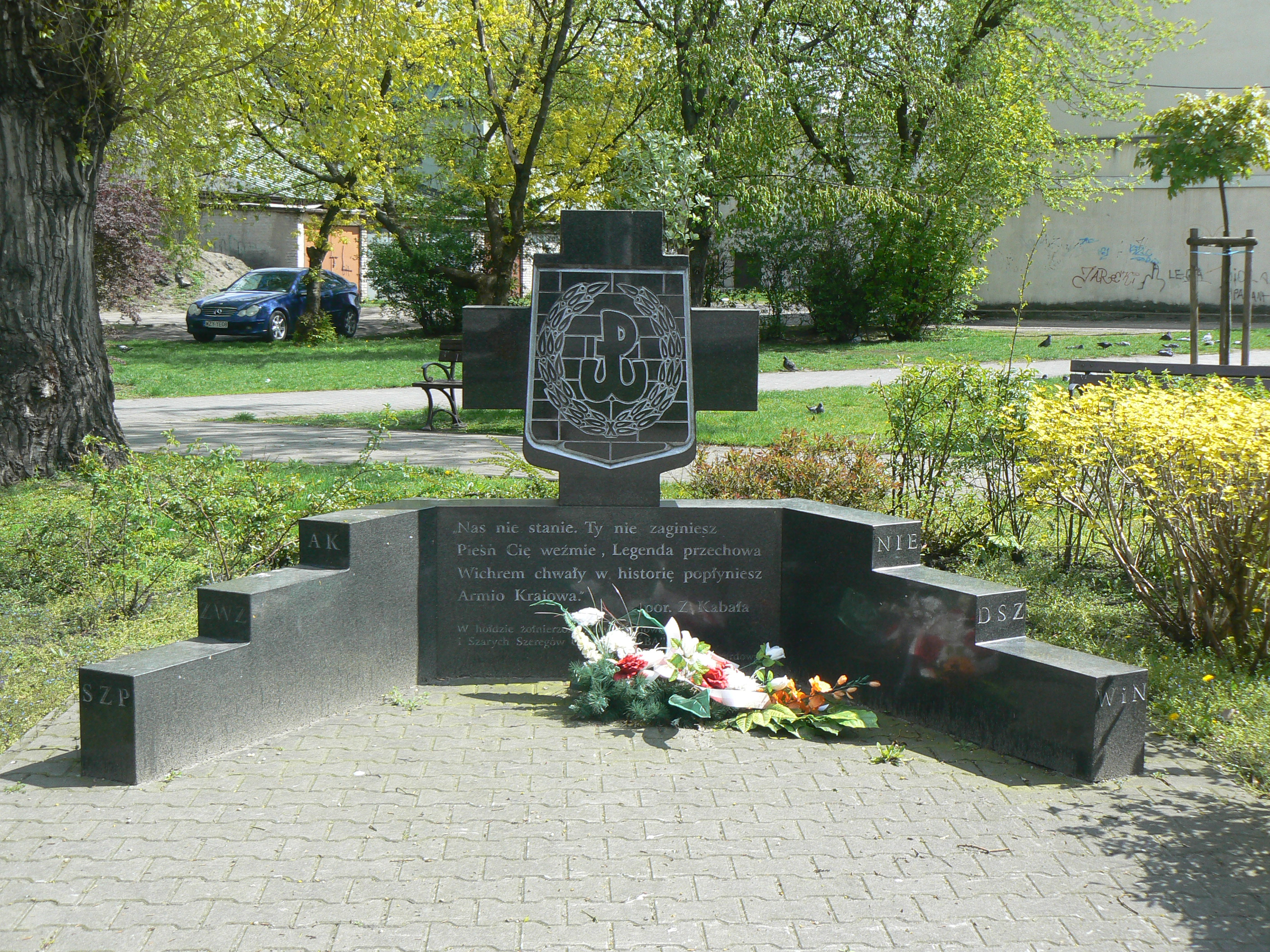
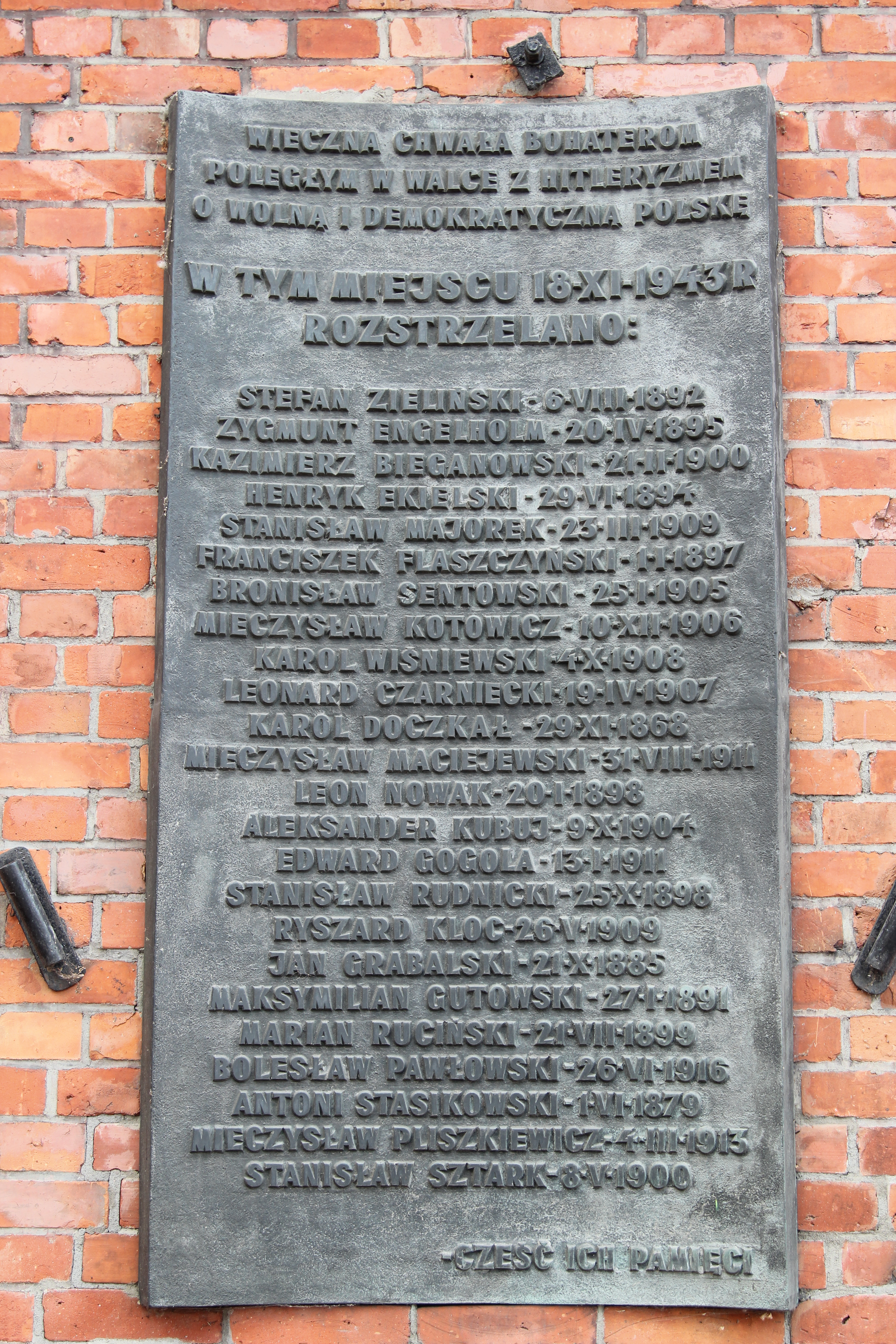
Memorials to local Polish partisans and victims of World War II

During the invasion of Poland at the start of World War II, with the onset of dawn on September 12, 1939, units of the 8th German Army launched an attack on Żyrardów. After several hours of fierce defence of the town, the Polish army had to leave their positions and start delaying actions towards Wiskitki, Guzów, Szymanów, and Paprotnia.

In 1941, the Germans transported local Jews into the Warsaw Ghetto.

The Polish resistance organized a unit of the Union of Armed Struggle and Home Army in Żyrardów, under the cryptonym "Żaba" ("frog"). Resistance activities included sabotage at local factories and power plants, as well as distributing Polish underground press from Warsaw and smuggling it further west. In 1943, local Poles took in a number of kidnapped Polish children from the Zamość region, which were either bought out or secretly taken off German trains. In revenge for the activities of the Polish resistance, the occupiers carried out mass arrests and executions of city residents. The largest arrests of over 1,000 people took place in June and August 1943. The largest public execution was committed on 18 November 1943, with 24 victims. One person managed to escape. German occupation ended on 16 January 1945.

=== Post-war period ===
From 1975 to 1998, Żyrardów was administratively located in the Skierniewice Voivodeship.

The municipal museum is nowadays located in the former palace of owner of factory K. Dittrich. A sign near the entrance to the little city states that it was the only town in Europe entirely set up for a factory. The city was named one of Poland's official national Historic Monuments (Pomnik historii), as designated 17 January, 2012. Its listing is maintained by the National Heritage Board of Poland.

== Monuments ==
Historic architecture (examples)

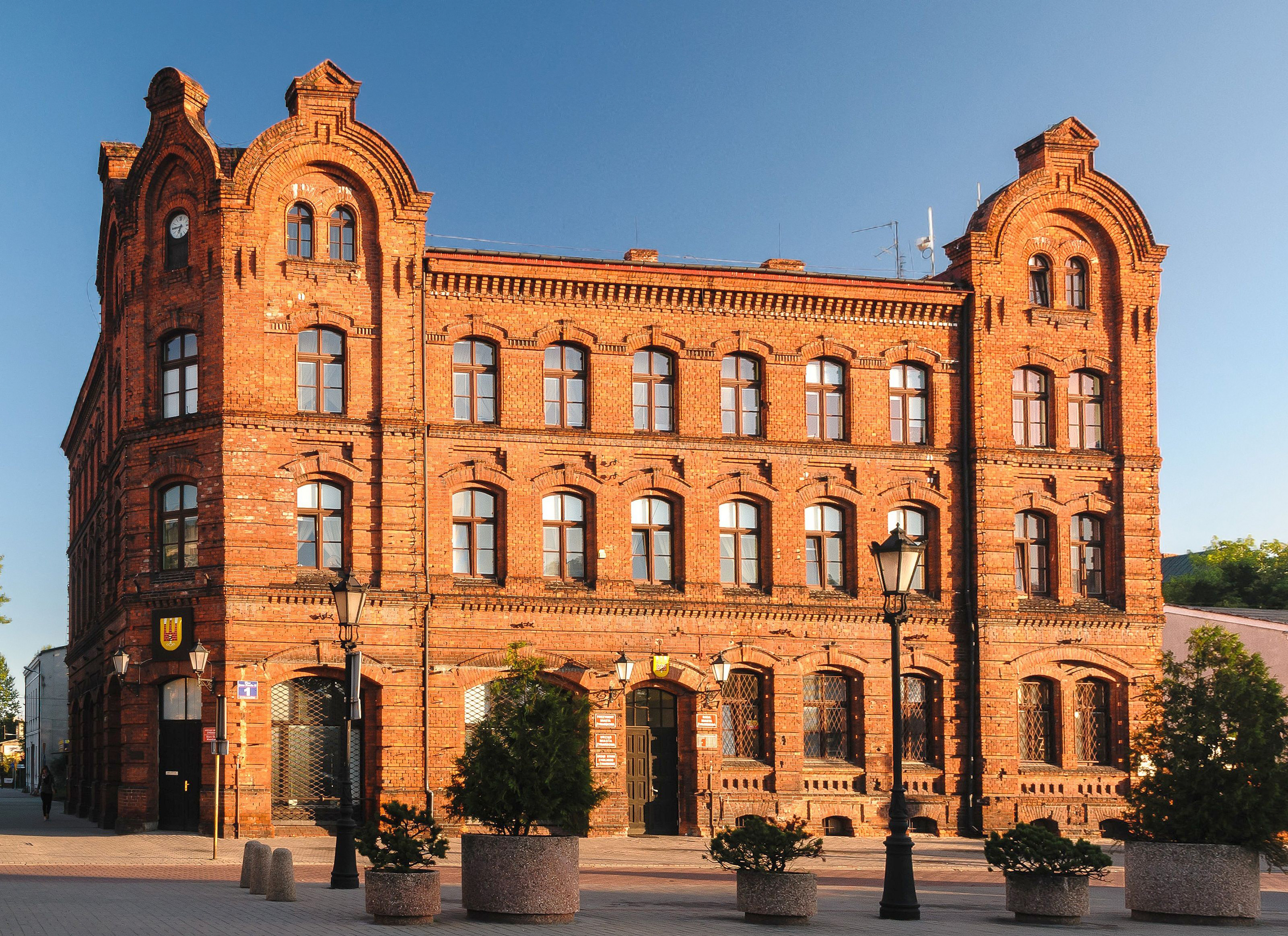
City magistrate

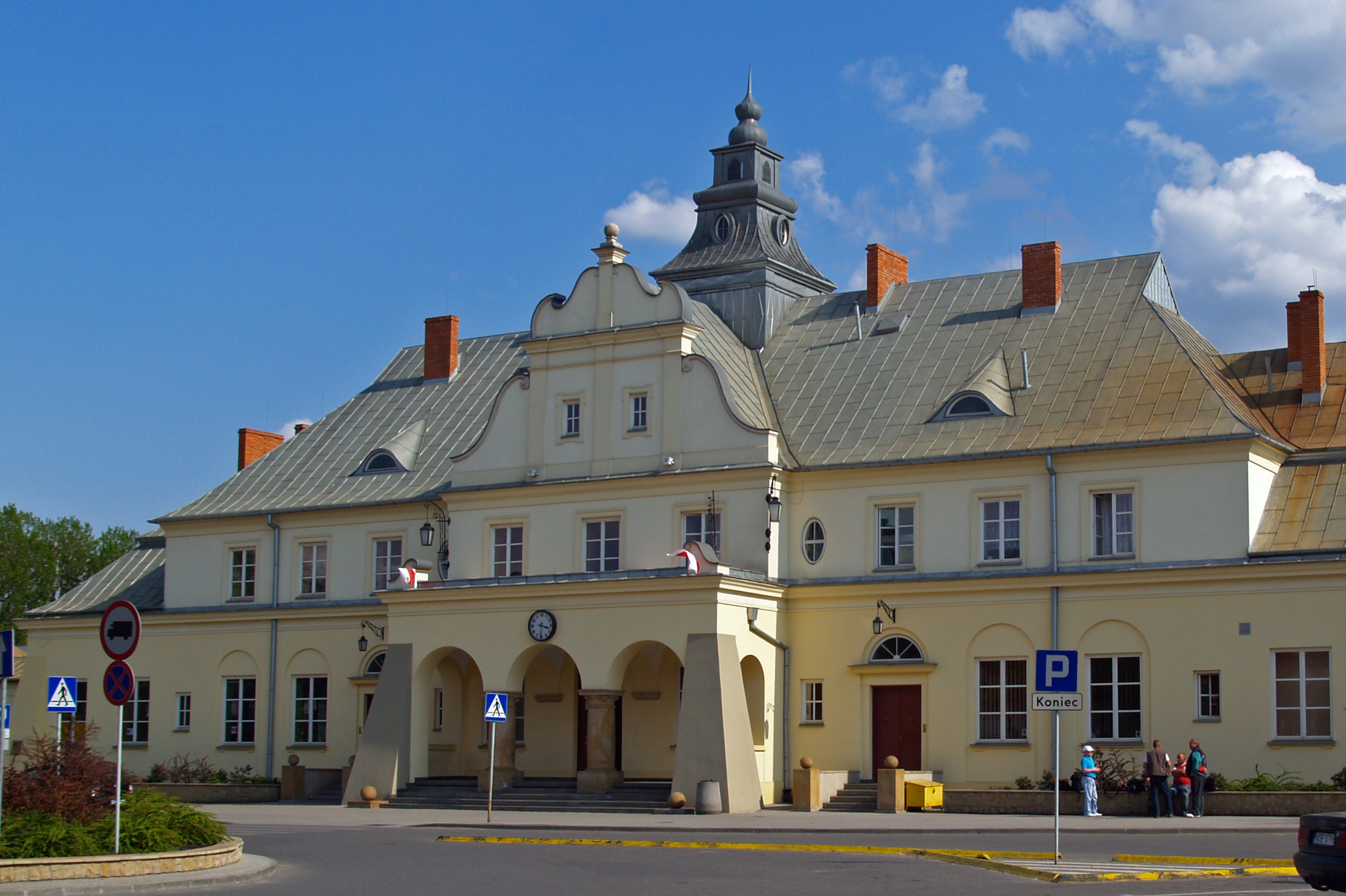
Żyrardów railway station (1845)

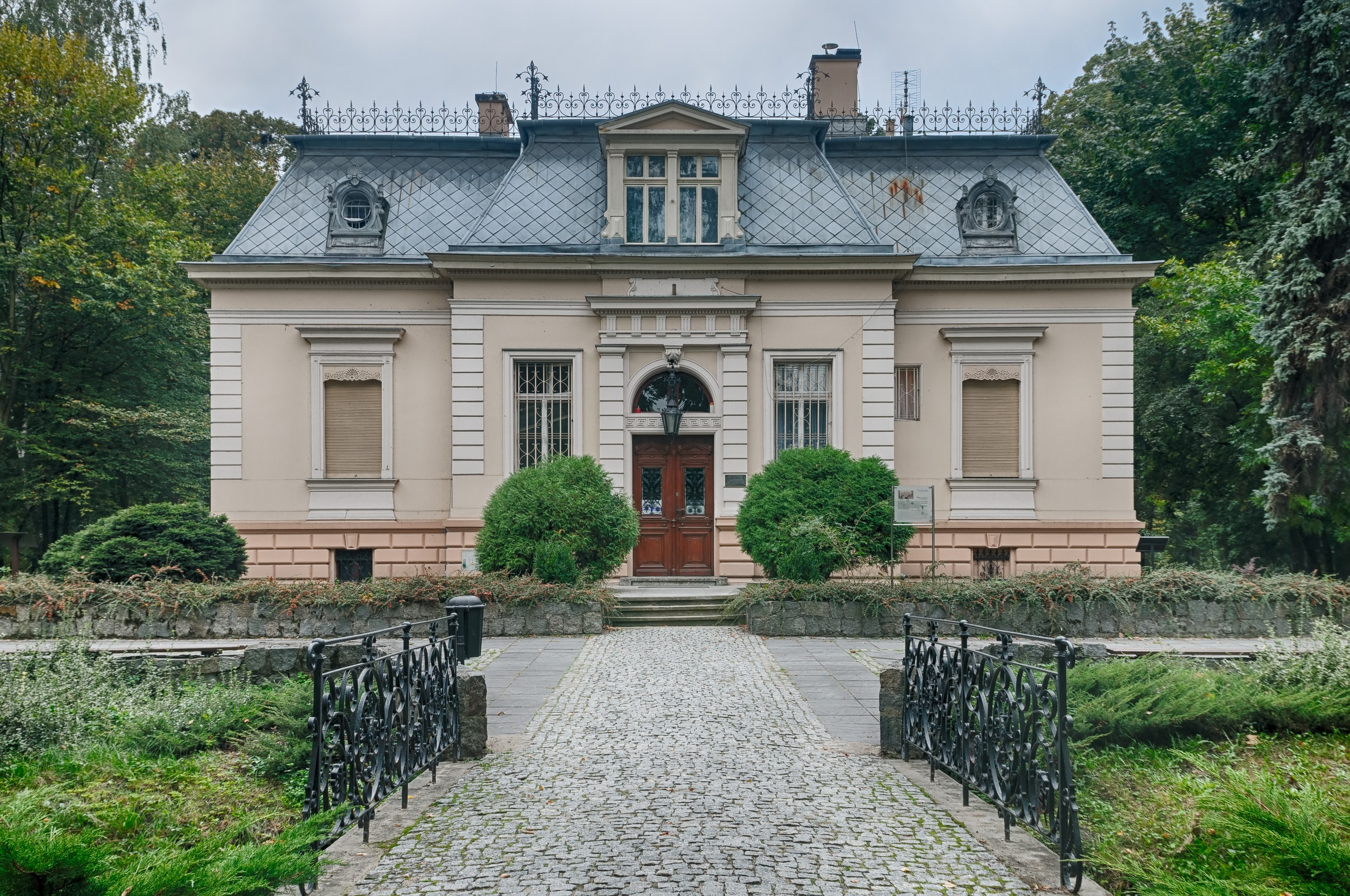
Museum of West Mazovia

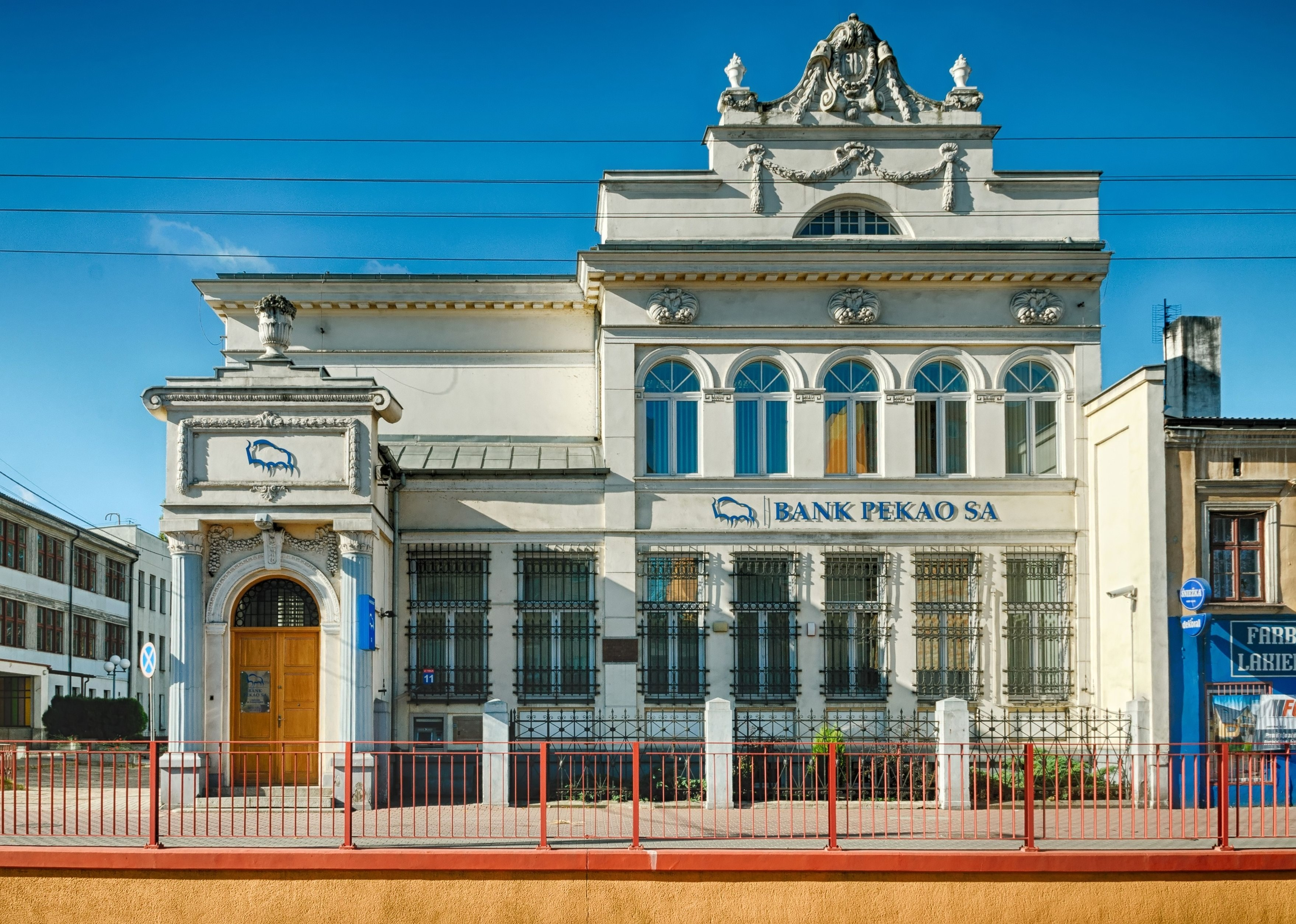
Bank Pekao building

Local branch of the Polish Society of War Veterans

Saint Charles Borromeo church

Most of Żyrardów's heritage monuments are located in the manufacturing area which dates from the 19th and early 20th centuries. It is widely believed that Żyrardów's textile settlement is the only complete 19th-century urban industrial complex to be preserved in Europe.

== Education ==
- Szkoła Mistrzostwa Sportowego w Kolarstwie
- Wyższa Szkoła Rozwoju Lokalnego
- Liceum Ogólnokształcące im. Stefana Żeromskiego
- Zespół Szkół Publicznych nr. 7 im. Henryka Sienkiewicza w Żyrardowie

== Sport ==
Since 1923 Żyrardów has a football club named Żyrardowianka Żyrardów (formerly Włókniarz Żyrardów), which in 2015/2016 played in the Polish IV League.

== Notable people ==
- Feliks Łubieński (1758–1848), landowner who gave the estate and his blessing to his sons to build the very first textile factory
- Henryk Łubieński (1793–1883), banker and industrialist, son of Felix
- Feliks Sobański (1833–1913), philanthropist who donated land for the church
- Paweł Hulka-Laskowski (1881–1946), a writer, translator and social activist
- Leszek Miller (born 1946), former Prime Minister of Poland, started his professional life as electrician in a local textile factory
- Piotr Nowakowski (born 1987), volleyball player, double World Champion
- Gosia Rdest (born 1993), a racing driver who competed in the W Series

== International relations ==
=== Twin towns — Sister cities ===
Żyrardów is twinned with:

- Tangshan, China
- Delchevo, North Macedonia
- Lourmarin, France
- Siero, Spain
- Tryavna, Bulgaria
