= Łubna-Jarosłaj =

- Village
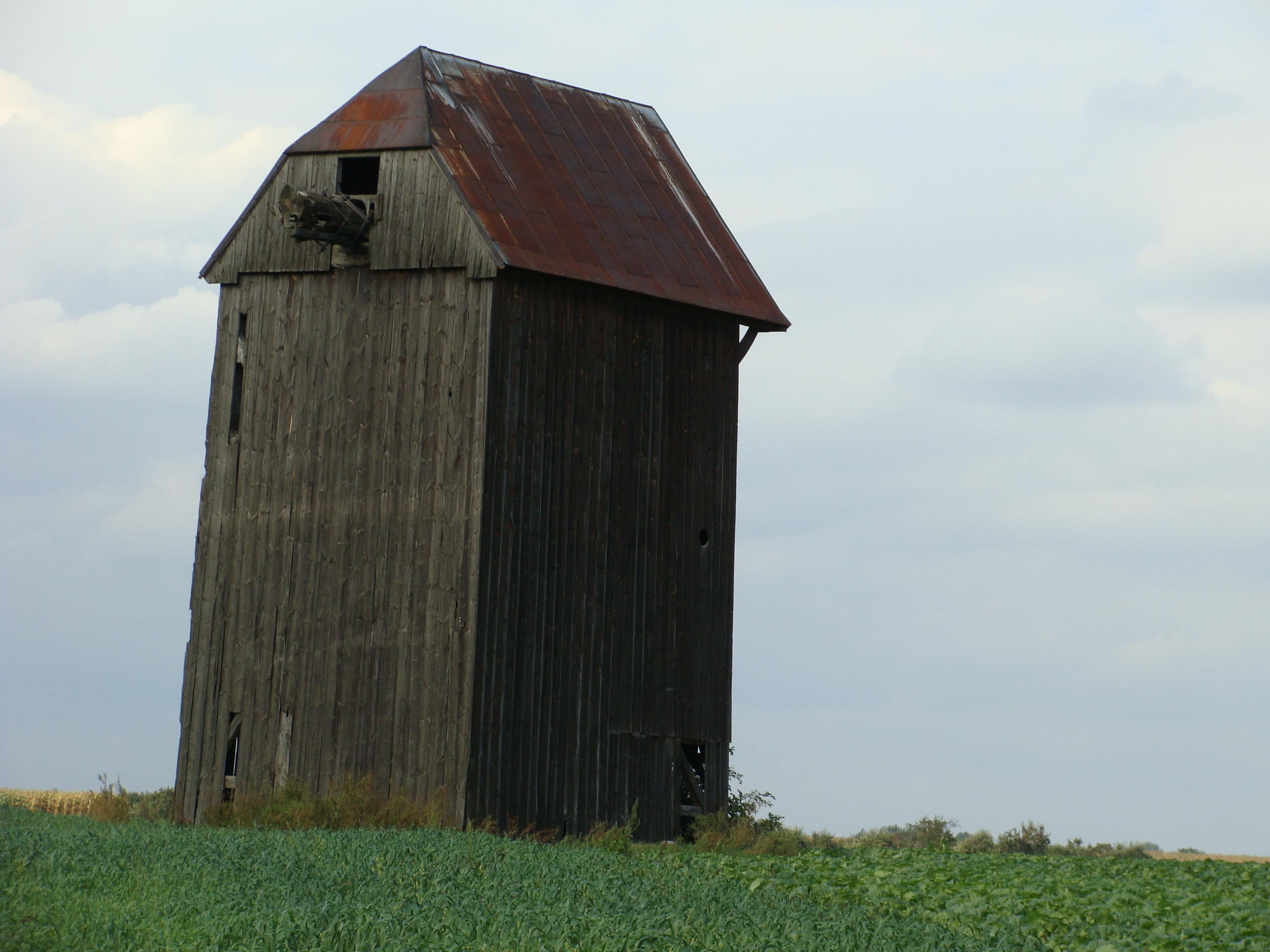

- Location within Poland
- Coordinates: 51°35′25″N 18°30′44″E
- Country: Poland
- Voivodeship: Łódź
- County: Sieradz
- Gmina: Błaszki

Łubna-Jarosłaj [ˈwubna jaˈrɔswai̯] is a village in the administrative district of Gmina Błaszki, within Sieradz County, Łódź Voivodeship, in central Poland.
