= Korean Polish =

Korean Polish, Korean Pole, or Polish Korean may refer to:

- Poland–North Korea relations (cf. "a Polish–Korean treaty")
- Poland–South Korea relations
- People with dual citizenship of Poland and North or South Korea

== See also ==
- Koreans in Poland
