= Korea–Poland relations =

Korea–Poland relations may refer to:

- Poland–North Korea relations
- Poland–South Korea relations
