= Bust of Georges Clemenceau =

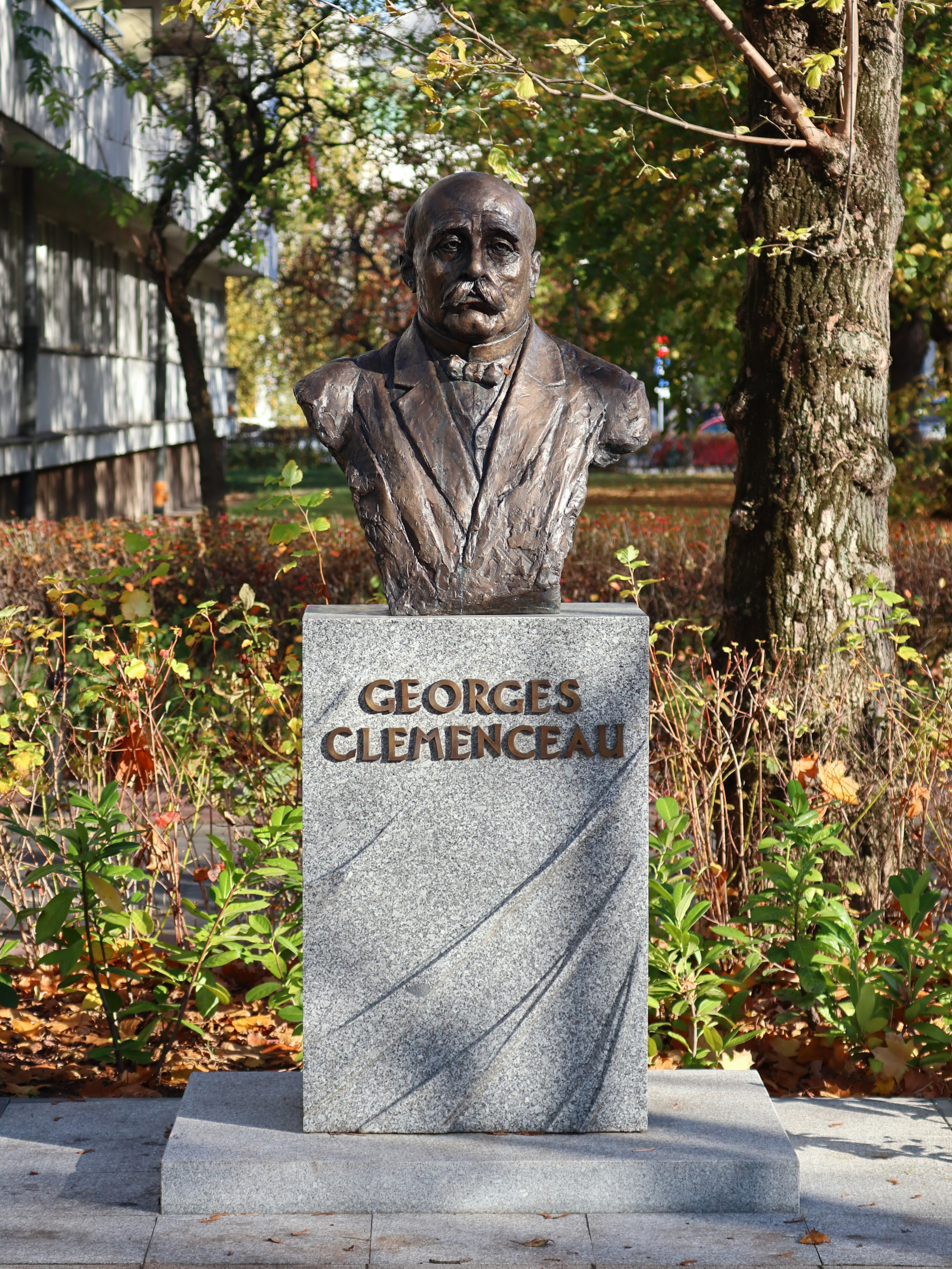
- The monument in 2022.
- Interactive map of Bust of Georges Clemenceau
- Location: Matejski Street, Downtown, Warsaw, Poland
- Coordinates: 52°13′29.76″N 21°01′28.21″E
- Designer: Bronisław Krzysztof
- Type: Bust
- Opening date: 26 May 2022
- Dedicated to: Georges Clemenceau

The bust of Georges Clemenceau (Polish: popiersie Georges’a Clemenceau; French: buste de Georges Clemenceau) is a monument in the city of Warsaw, Poland, placed at the corner of Ujazdów Avenue and Matejski Street, within the South Downtown neighbourhood. It has the form of a bust sculpture of Georges Clemenceau, the Prime Minister of France serving from 1906 to 1909 and again from 1917 to 1920. The monument was designed by Bolesław Krzysztof, and unveiled on 26 May 2022.

== History ==
The monument was proposed and financed by the Association of the Members of the Legion of Honour and the French National Order of Merit, and was approved by the Warsaw City Council. The bust sculpture was designed by Bronisław Krzysztof. It was unveiled on 26 May 2022 by Frédéric Billet, the ambassador of France to Poland. The monument was placed at the Georges Clemenceau Square, a small garden square at the corner of Ujazdów Avenue and Matejski Street.
