= Embassy of North Korea, Warsaw =

Diplomatic mission of North Korea in Poland

Embassy of the Democratic People's Republic of Korea in Poland
- 뽈스까 조선 대사관
- Emblem of North Korea

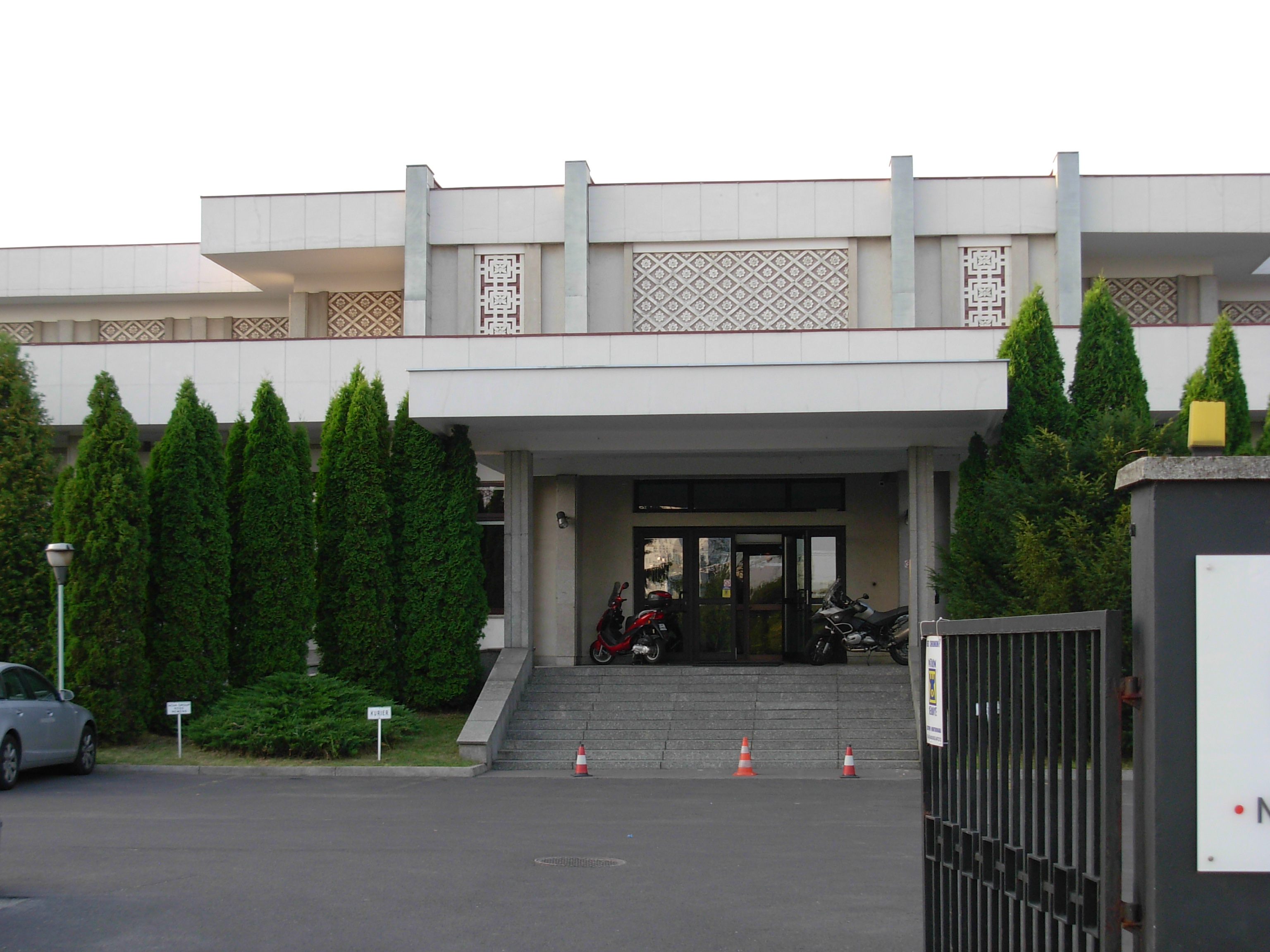
- The building of the embassy of North Korea in Warsaw, Poland, in 2007.

Agency overview
- Formed: 1951
- Type: Diplomatic mission
- Headquarters: 1a Bobrowiecka St., 00-728 Warsaw, Poland; 52°11′47.00″N 21°02′48.33″E
- Employees: 12
- Ambassador responsible: Choe Il
- Website: krld.pl

The Embassy of North Korea in Poland, (Note: Polish: Ambasada Korei Północnej w Polsce) officially known as the Embassy of the Democratic People's Republic of Korea in Poland, (Note: Polish: Ambasada Koreańskiej Republiki Ludowo-Demokratycznej w Polsce; Korean: 뽈스까 조선 대사관) is the diplomatic mission of North Korea in Poland. The embassy is located in the city of Warsaw, Poland, at the 1a Bobrowiecka Street. The current ambassador of North Korea to Poland is Choe Il.

== History ==
The international relations between North Korea and Poland was established in 1948. The embassy of North Korea was opened in Poland in 1951, with its headquarters being located in the capital city of Warsaw, in the Pod Karczochem Palace at 14 Ujazdów Avenue. The works on the designing and construction of the new embassy building, located at 1a Bobrowiecka Street in Warsaw, began in 1966. The new building was ceremonially opened in 1984 by Kim Il Sung, President of North Korea. It operates to the present day.

The government of North Korea rents a portion of the embassy as office space for commercial businesses. The Ministry of Foreign Affairs of Poland demands complete suspension of such activities, noting that renting embassies for profit is against international law, specifically Article 41(3) of the Vienna Convention on Diplomatic Relations. However, despite that, the embassy continues the practice, denying accusation of breaking the law. Among companies that rented office spaces there was Ryszard Petru Consulting, owned by politician Ryszard Petru. In 2015, he removed his company from the building, and told the press, that he was not aware of who was the owner. As of 2024, the practice still continues.

== See also ==
- North Korea–Poland relations
