= North Korea–Poland relations =

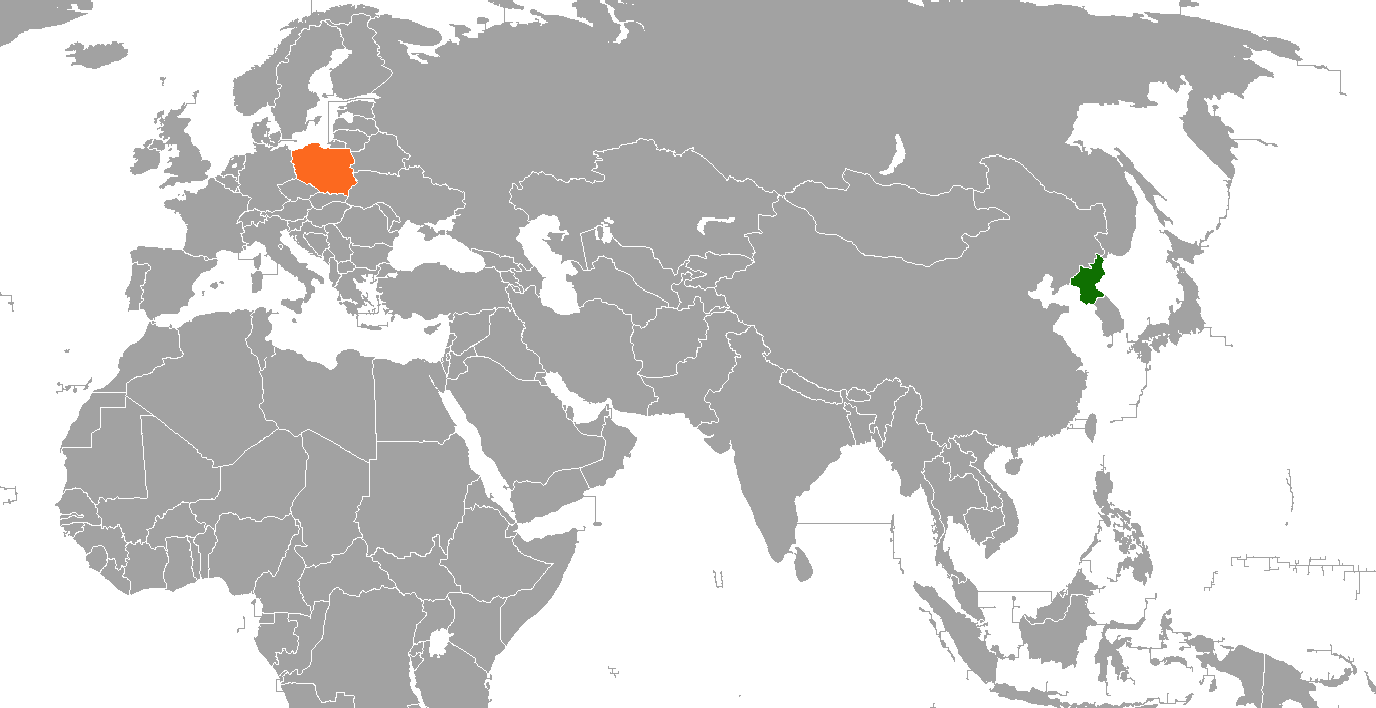

- North Korea: Poland

North Korea–Poland relations (Korean: 뽈스까공화국-조선민주주의인민공화국관계) are foreign relations between Poland and North Korea.

Poland is one of the few countries that maintain diplomatic and limited trading (fishing) relations with Democratic People's Republic of Korea.

North Korea maintains an embassy in Warsaw, and Poland in Pyongyang. As of 2020, the North Korean ambassador is Il Choe.

According to a 2013 BBC World Service Poll, only 5% of Poles view North Korea's influence positively, with 68% expressing a negative view.

== Overview ==
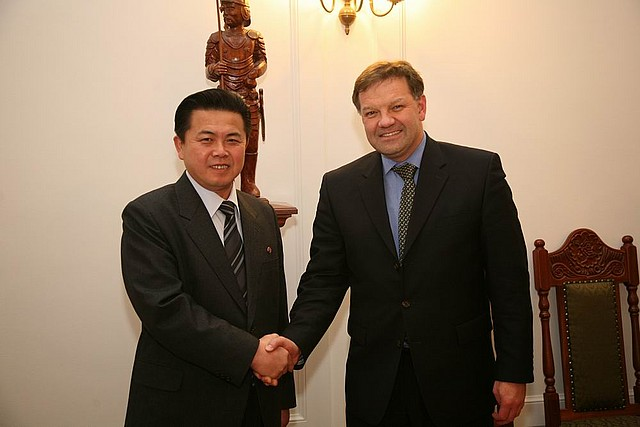
North Korea's ambassador to Poland Kim Pyong-il and Undersecretary of State at the Chancellery of the President of Poland Mariusz Handzlik in Warsaw in 2010

Poland recognized the DPRK on 16 October 1948 as the sole legitimate government of the whole Korea, when both countries had Soviet-installed communist regimes. In 1989, Poland lost its status as a "friend" and its privileged position in contacts with the DPRK. Despite the change from communism to capitalism in Poland in 1989 and Poland's establishing relations with South Korea, relations between Poland and DPRK remain at a fair level.

From June 1956, Poland has been part of the NNSC (Neutral Nations Supervisory Commission) named by the DPRK and Chinese Volunteers to carry out inspections and investigations as part of the armistice agreement. After Poland and Czechoslovakia ceased to be communist, the Korean People's Army took over the camps and expelled the Poles and Czechs in 1993; however, Poland continues to send representatives to commission meetings twice a year, which the NNSC regards as legitimizing its position with 75% of the original delegations intact.

During the Korean War, after North Korea's request, Poland took in and offered education to 1,400 North Korean children and youth, mostly orphans. They were housed in Gołotczyzna, Świder, Płakowice, Szklarska Poręba and Bardo. 350 children returned to North Korea in 1956–1958, and the remainder returned in 1959 by decision of Kim Il Sung. Poland also provides North Korea with small grants in farming equipment and medicine.

== Trade relations ==
Bilateral economic contacts between Poland and the North Korea are limited, particularly due to the sanctions imposed on the North Korea by the UN Security Council and the volume of trade exchange is minimal. As of 2017:

- Polish imports: €1.7 million ($1.92 million; equivalent to $2.52 million in 2025). Two-thirds of this value was plastics and electrical equipment. Main items:
  - Polyethylene: €540 thousand,
  - Yarn: €200 thousand,
  - Printing machines: €100 thousand, and
  - Batteries: €69 thousand.
- Polish exports: €0.217 million ($0.245 million; equivalent to $0.322 million in 2025). Of the above, as much as 87.5% was resettlement-related property of Polish diplomats, while almost all the rest was equipment needed for the renovation of the Polish Embassy in Pyongyang.

The only company with Polish capital that operated in North Korea was Chopol, a now-defunct joint venture between Poland and North-Korea that dealt in the maritime transport of goods. The company was established in 1987 during the era of the Soviet-installed communist government in Poland. It was liquidated in July 2018 by the Polish Ministry of Foreign Affairs after a long period of inactivity.

== Diplomatic relations ==
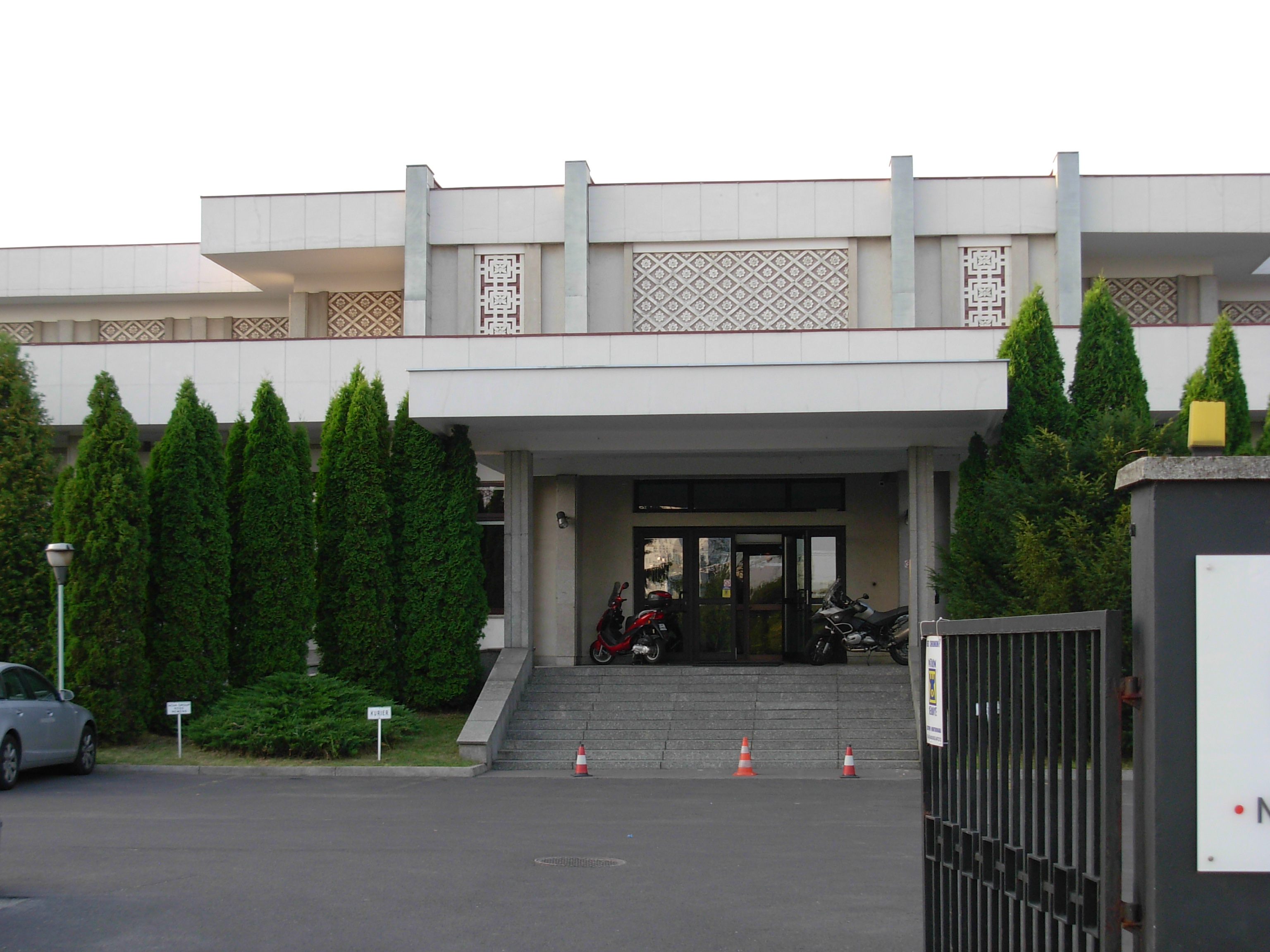
North Korean embassy in Warsaw

Poland maintains its embassy in Pyongyang and DPRK maintains its embassy in Warsaw. As of 2024, the Republic of Poland and DPRK have signed 8 bilateral treaties, 6 as the Polish People's Republic and 2 as the Republic of Poland.

== Official visits between the countries ==
Polish visits to North Korea:

- 1986 - Chairman Wojciech Jaruzelski
- 2001 - Vice Minister of Foreign Affairs of Poland (political consultations)
- 2004 - Vice Minister of Foreign Affairs of Poland (political consultations)
- 2007 - Vice Minister of Foreign Affairs of Poland (political consultations)

Korean visits to Poland:

- 1956 - Premier Kim Il Sung
- 1984 - President Kim Il Sung
- 2008 - Vice Minister of Foreign Affairs of the DPRK (political consultations)

== See also ==
- Koreans in Poland
- Poland–South Korea relations
