= Armed Forces Day (Poland) =

National holiday in Poland

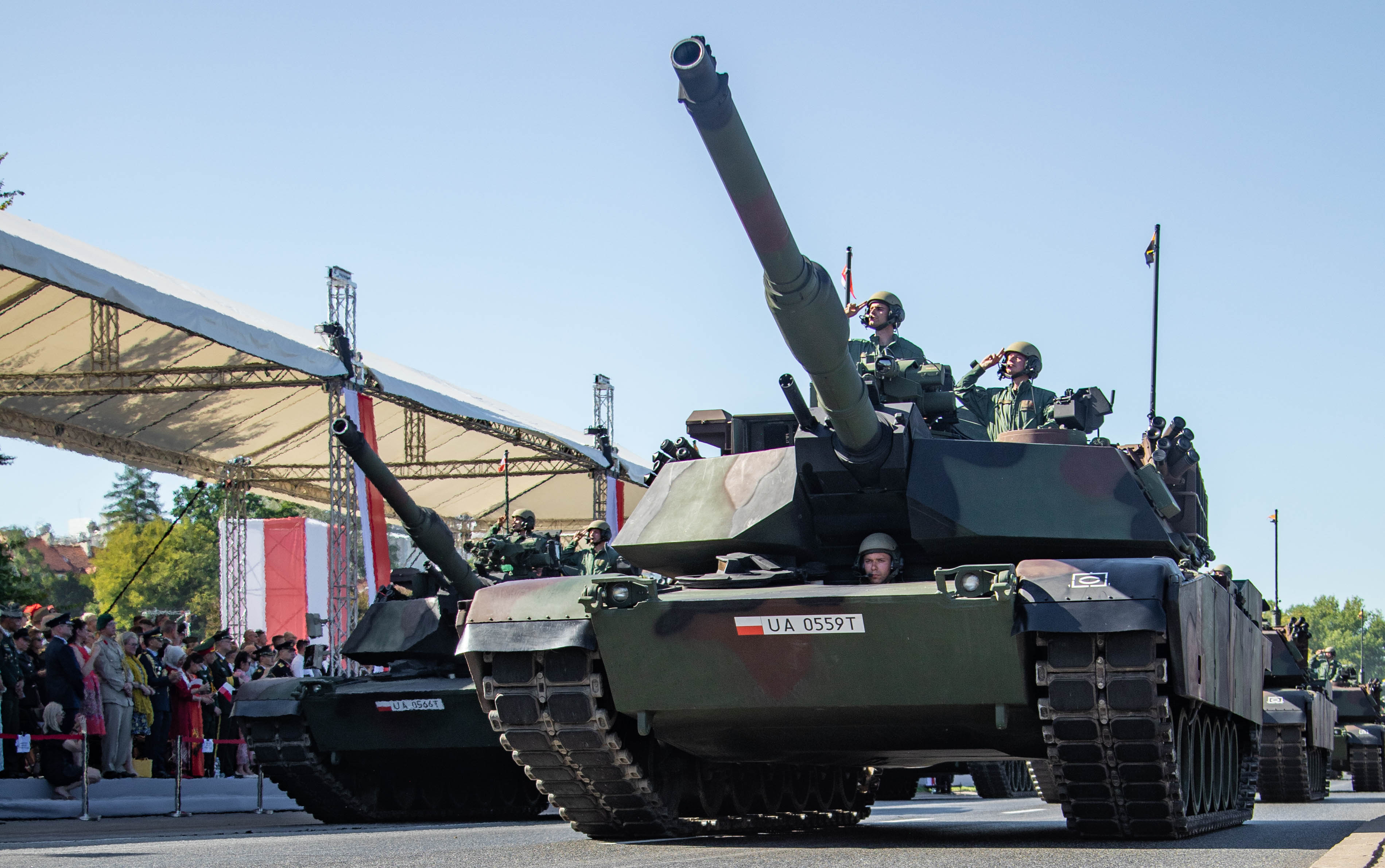
- Armed Forces Day 2023, Warsaw
- Official name: Święto Wojska Polskiego
- Observed by: Poland
- Significance: Battle of Warsaw (1920)
- Celebrations: Military parades, equipment reviews, silences
- Begins: 13:00 CET
- Date: 15 August
- Next time: 15 August 2027
- Frequency: annual

Armed Forces Day (Polish: Święto Wojska Polskiego), (Note: literally Holiday or Celebration of the Polish Armed Forces) is a national holiday celebrated annually on 15 August in Poland, commemorating the anniversary of the 1920 victory over Soviet Russia at the Battle of Warsaw during the Polish–Soviet War. Armed Forces Day is held in conjunction with the Day of the Assumption of the Virgin Mary, itself a separate public holiday. The event is marked by military parades, equipment reviews, showcases and remembrances by all branches of the Polish Armed Forces across the country. One of the most prominent events of the day is in the capital Warsaw, which hosts a large military parade through the city's center. Originally celebrated during the Second Republic, the holiday was barred by authorities during the communist era beginning in 1947, only to be revived again in 1992.

== History ==
In the event dubbed by critics the "Miracle on the Vistula," the Polish Army under the command of Marshal Józef Piłsudski successfully repulsed a Red Army offensive outside of Warsaw in mid-August 1920. The defeat of the Russian army ensured the capital's protection and the survival of the young Second Polish Republic. To commemorate the Republic's victory over the Red Army, Minister of Military Affairs Stanisław Szeptycki established the Feast of the Soldier (Święto Żołnierza), or Soldiers Day, in 1923. In proclaiming the holiday, Szeptycki declared that, "on the anniversary of the memorable defeat of the Bolshevik onslaught on Warsaw, we honor the memory of those killed in battles with enemies throughout all ages and for Polish independence." The date of 15 August was chosen as it coincided with the 21st Mountain Division's evening counterattack on Russian troops, eventually forcing the Red Army's general retreat. Additionally, the government of the Second Republic desired the military's greater integration with the new state, as well as for the armed forces to improve its image among the civilian public.

The Feast of the Soldier remained a celebrated holiday until 1947, when the newly installed communist government of the People's Republic of Poland discontinued the tradition. In 1950, the Council of Ministers under Prime Minister Józef Cyrankiewicz passed regulations to officially celebrate the military on 12 October. Renaming the celebration as Polish Armed Forces Day (Dzień Wojska Polskiego), the day marked the anniversary of the Soviet-organized Polish 1st Tadeusz Kościuszko Infantry Division engaging German units at the Battle of Lenino in October 1943. The communist government found it impossible to celebrate the original date of 15 August and its coinciding historical significance, owing to its glorification of the Red Army's defeat. Following the return of democracy in the wake of the events of 1989, the Sejm approved the restoration of Armed Forces Day to the original 15 August date and meaning on 30 July 1992, repealing the earlier communist era 1950 declaration.

== Commemorations ==
Armed Forces Day is celebrated throughout Poland, with military parades, commemorations for active personnel, veterans, and the dead. As the day coincides with the religious Day of the Assumption, church masses across the country reflect on the memory of Poland's military dead. Additionally, a number of military-themed events are held throughout many of the nation's larger towns and cities, including equipment demonstrations for the general public and open house events.

In Warsaw, the holiday is commemorated by several state events in the central Śródmieście borough of the capital. As head of state and commander-in-chief, the President of Poland presides over promotions of high-ranking officers, including the promotion of colonels to generals at the Presidential Palace. The pageantry continues with commemorations near the Tomb of the Unknown Soldier held in Piłsudski Square. The events in Warsaw typically involve the participation of the nation's political establishment, including the president, the prime minister, and leading members of the cabinet. Leading politicians also lay wreaths at the Józef Piłsudski Monument, as well as at the Tomb of the Unknown Soldier.

As a NATO member state, Armed Forces Day in Poland typically draws representatives from other allied militaries in attendance.

The centennial celebrations for 2020 were "1920 Battle of Warsaw – a Polish victory for the freedom of Europe".

=== Armed Forces Day Parade ===
One of the main attractions of the Warsaw festivities is a military parade of servicemen and women, as well as a review of existing military equipment, held normally along Ujazdów Avenue. Active servicemen and women participate at many events, joined often by volunteers appearing in historical dress, including those donning the equipment and dress of the Polish–Soviet War or other historical periods. The first grand military parades since the holiday was reinstated in Warsaw were in 2007 and 2008, and parades have been held yearly since 2013. In 2019, the parade took place in the southern city of Katowice to honour the participation of Silesia's residents in the Silesian Uprisings from 1919 to 1921.

== Image gallery ==
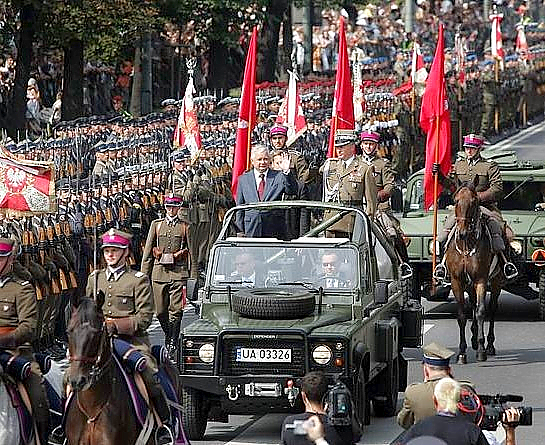
President Lech Kaczyński reviewing troops, Warsaw, 2007

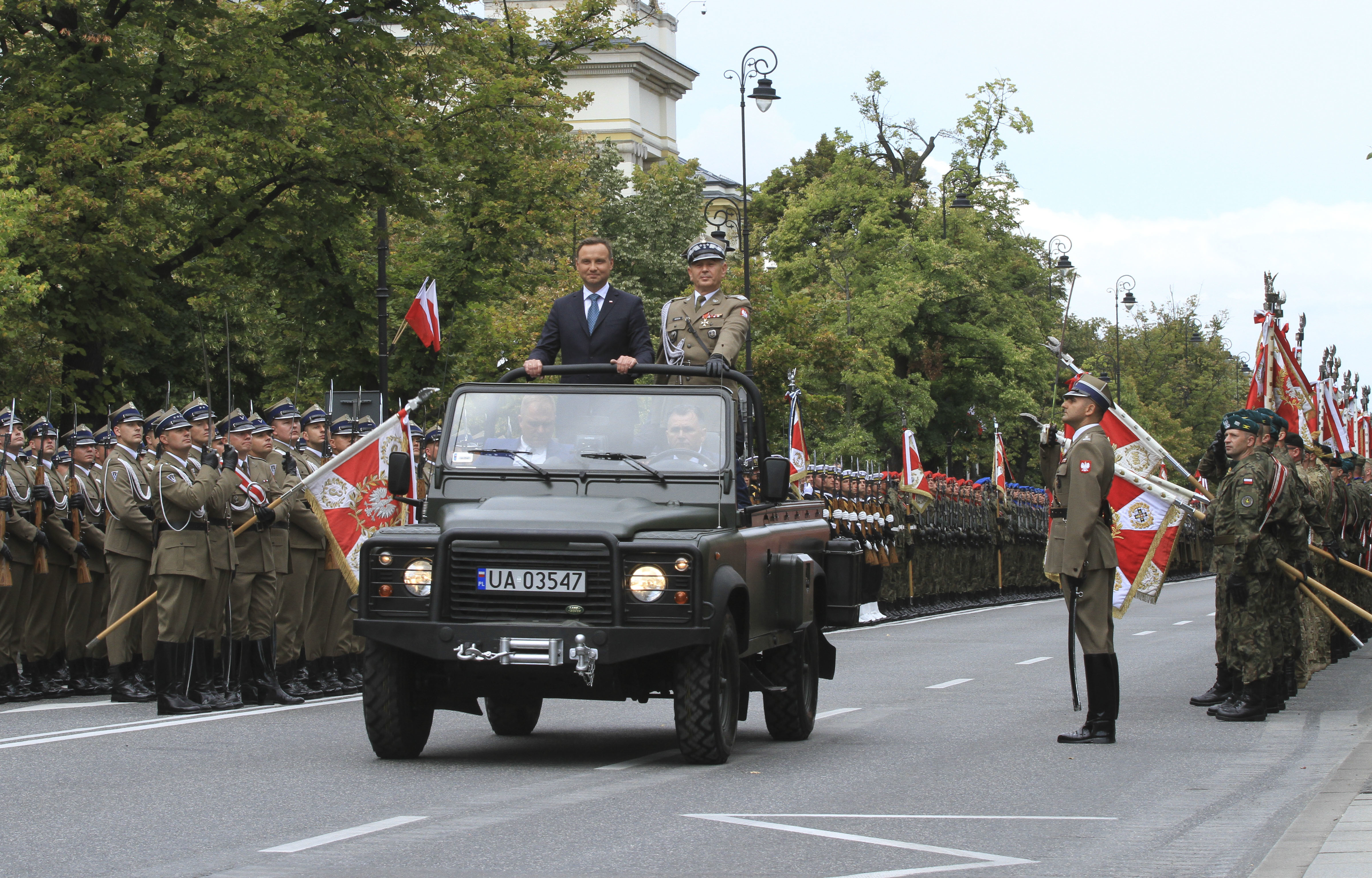
President Andrzej Duda and Chief of Staff Gen. Mieczyslaw Gocul arrive at the Armed Forces Day parade in Warsaw in 2016

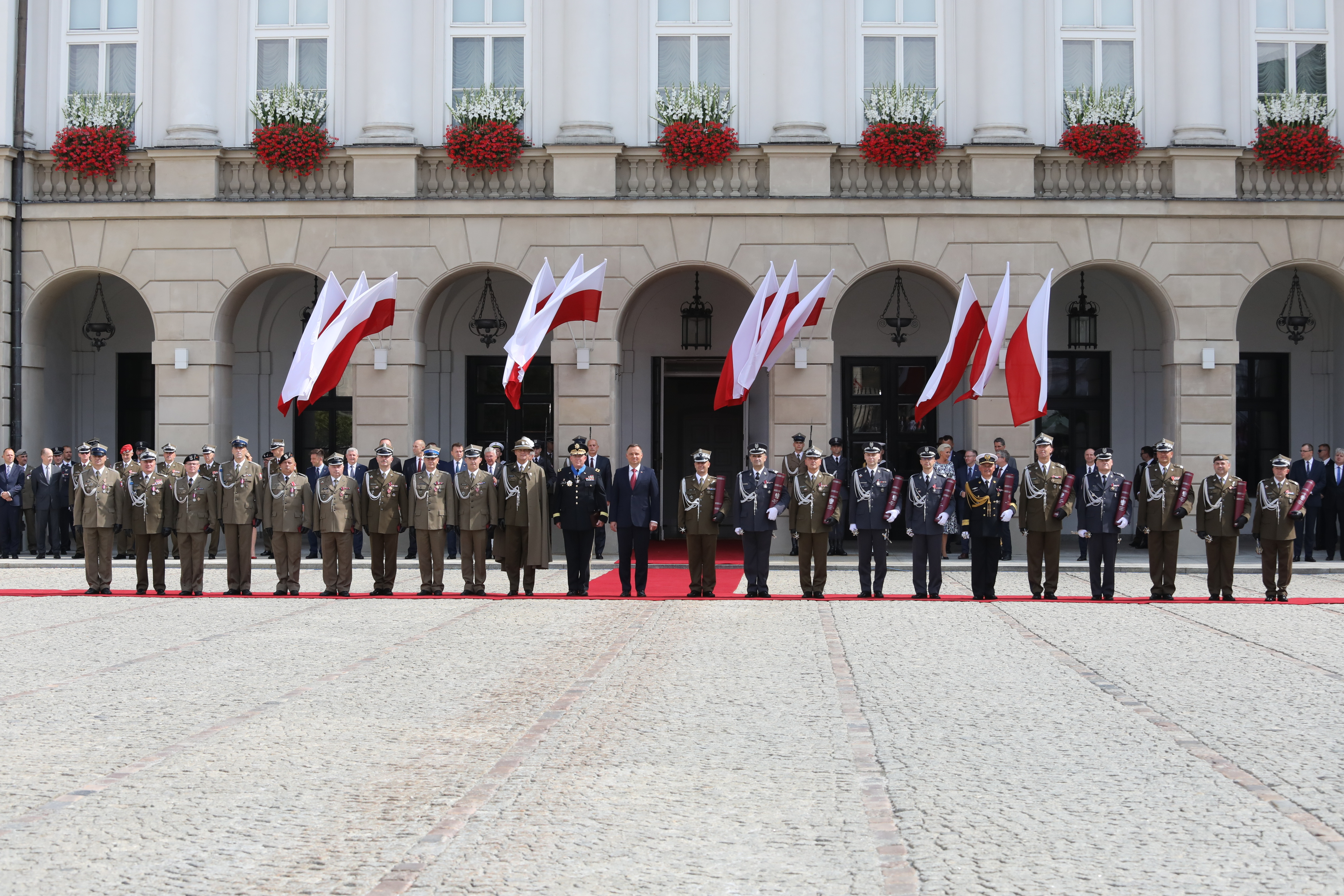
President Andrzej Duda and the Marshal of the Sejm together with officers of the Polish Armed Forces during the Armed Forces Day in 2019

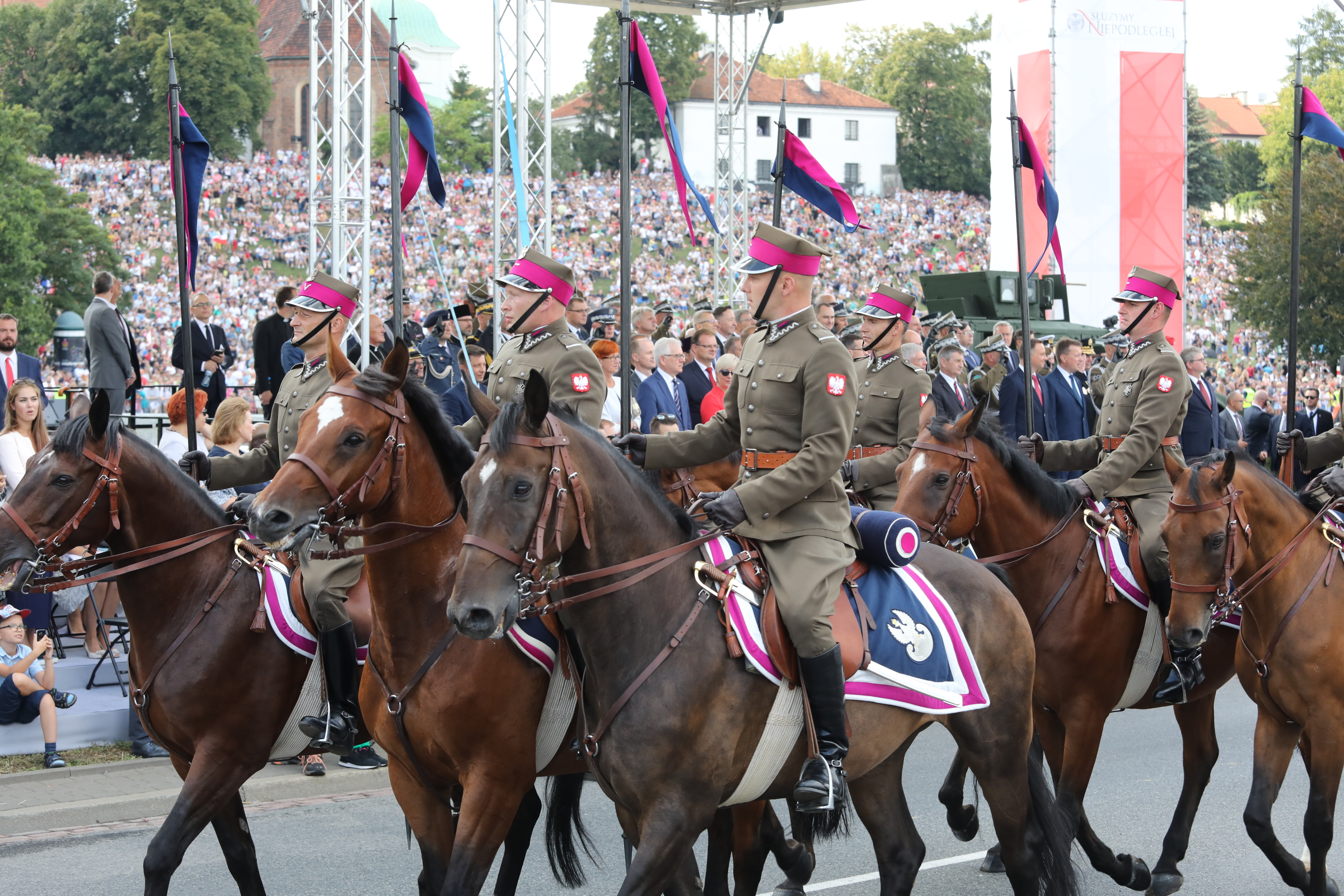
Soldiers dressed in traditional uniforms of the Polish uhlans light cavalry in 2018

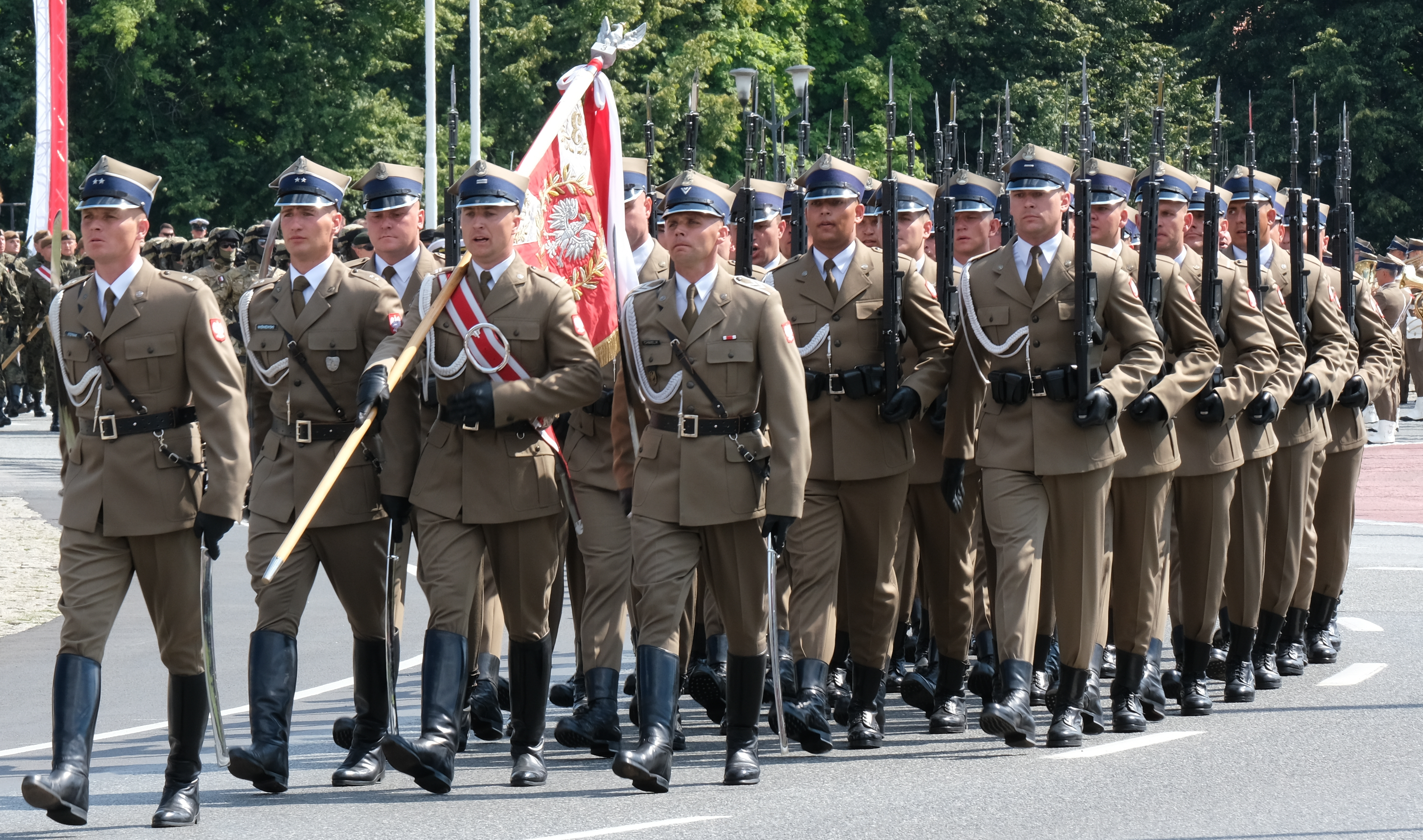
Soldiers of the Polish Land Forces in 2019

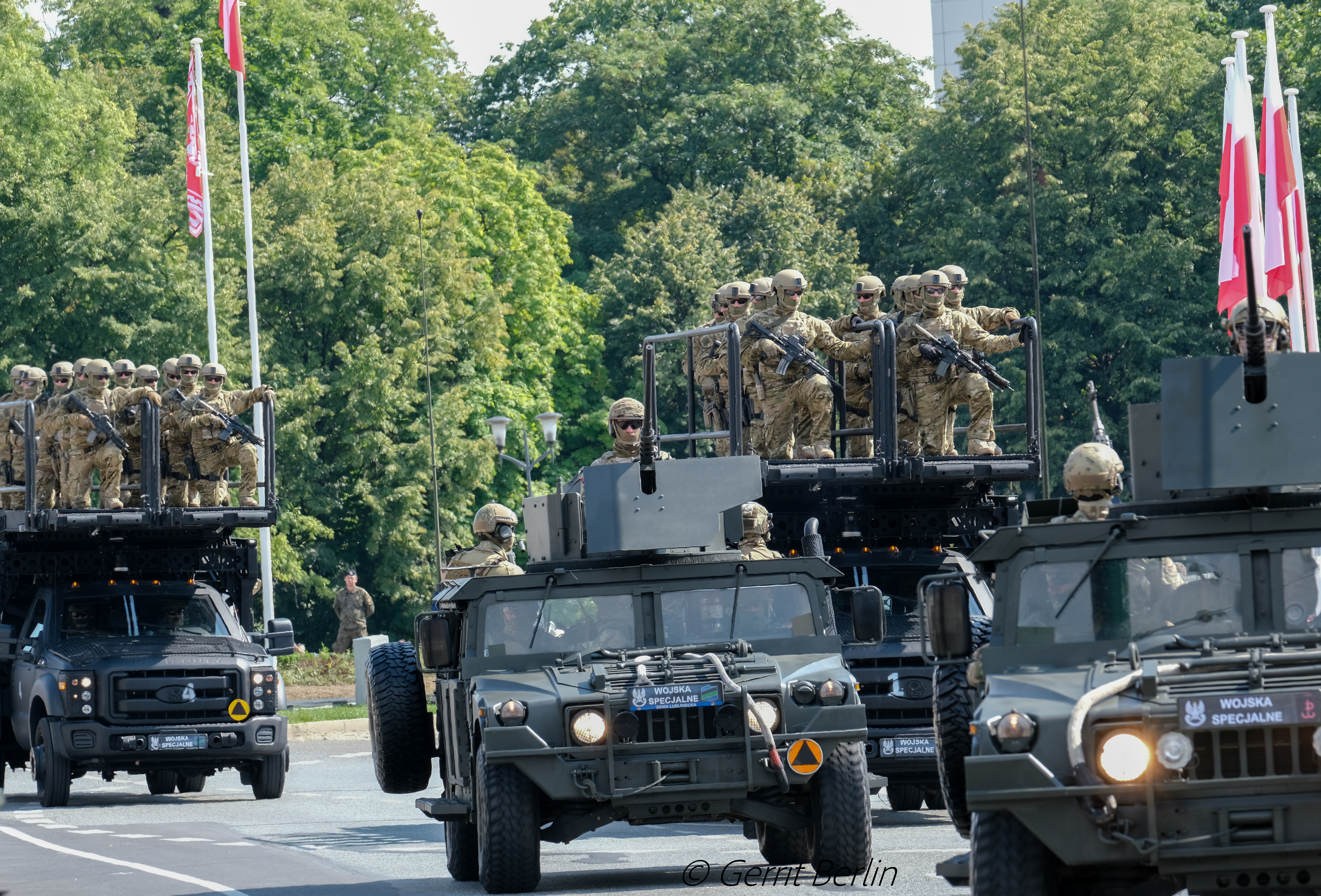
Polish Special Operations soldiers on Armed Forces Day in Katowice in 2019

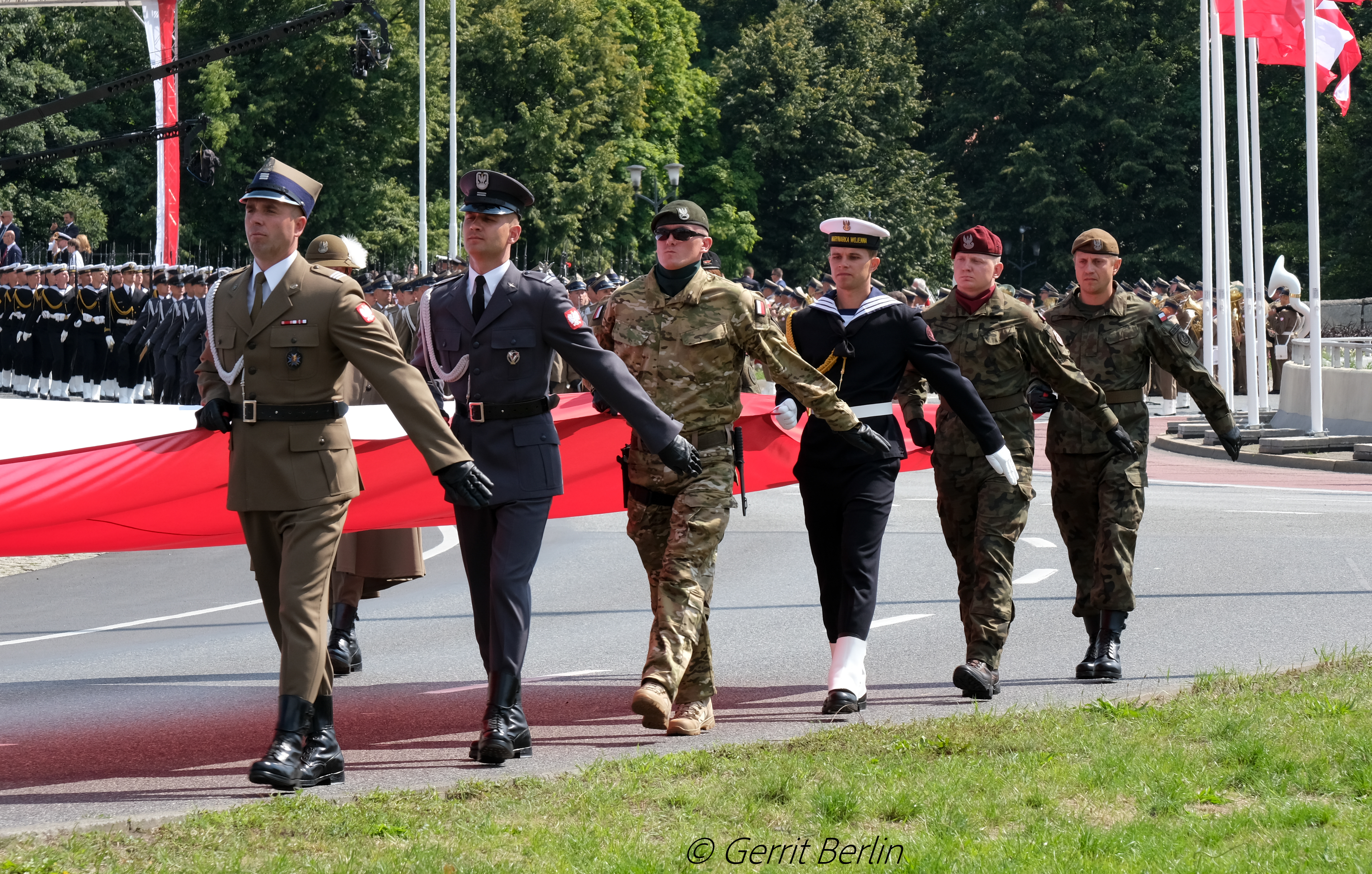
Representatives of the main service branches of the Polish Armed Forces in 2019

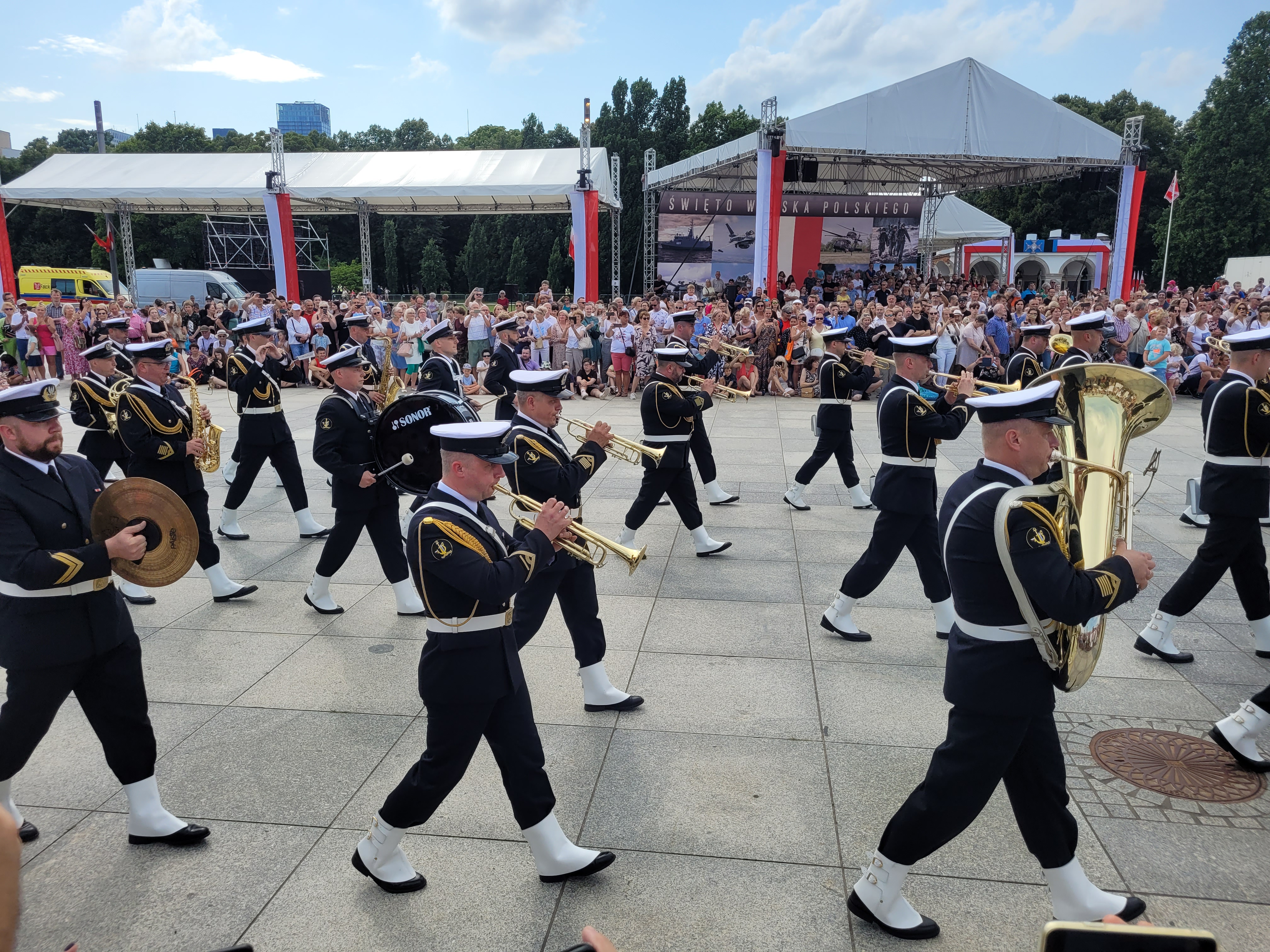
Celebrations on the Piłsudski Square in 2022

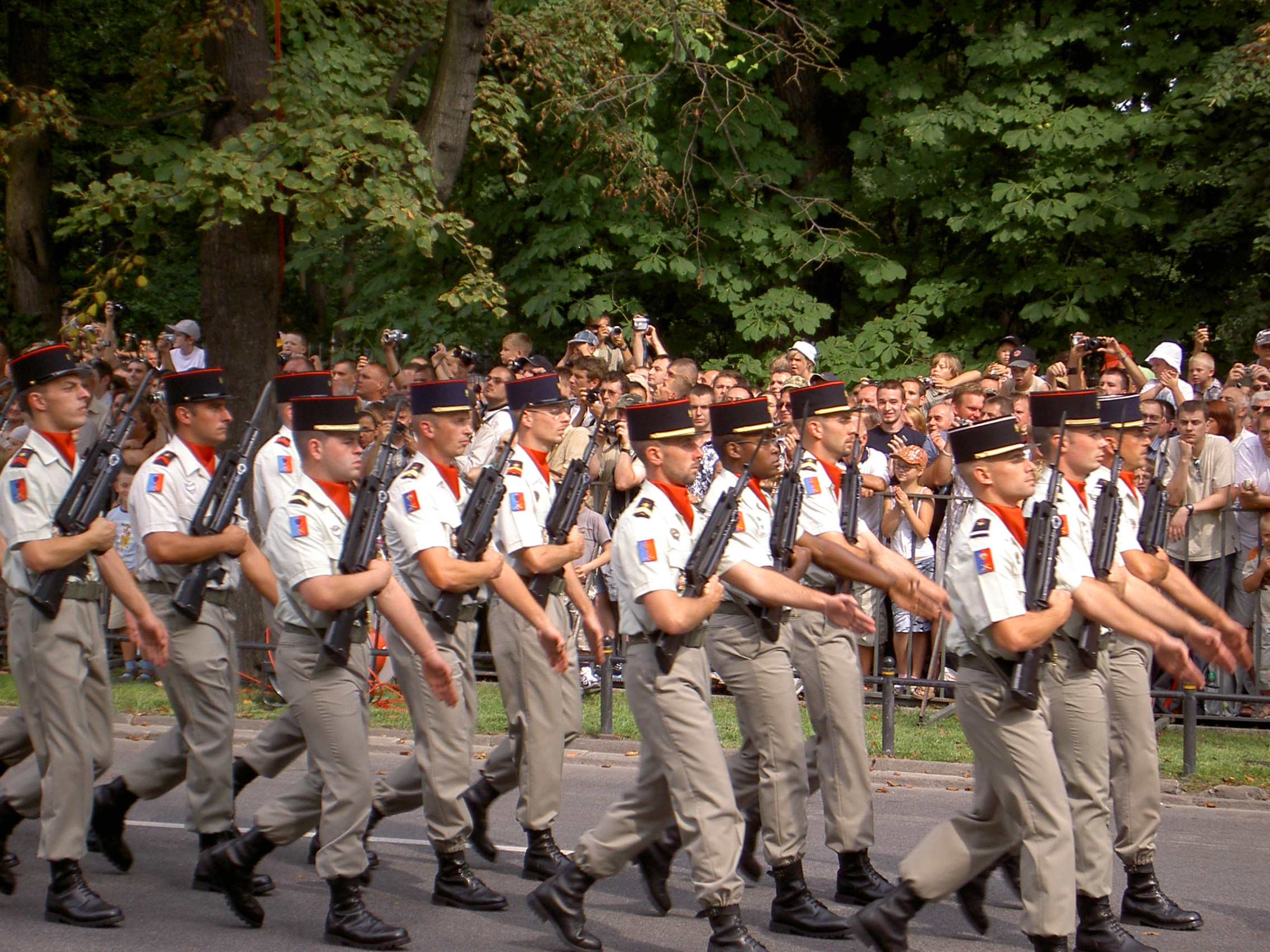
Honor guard of the French Army's First Artillery Regiment, Warsaw, 2007

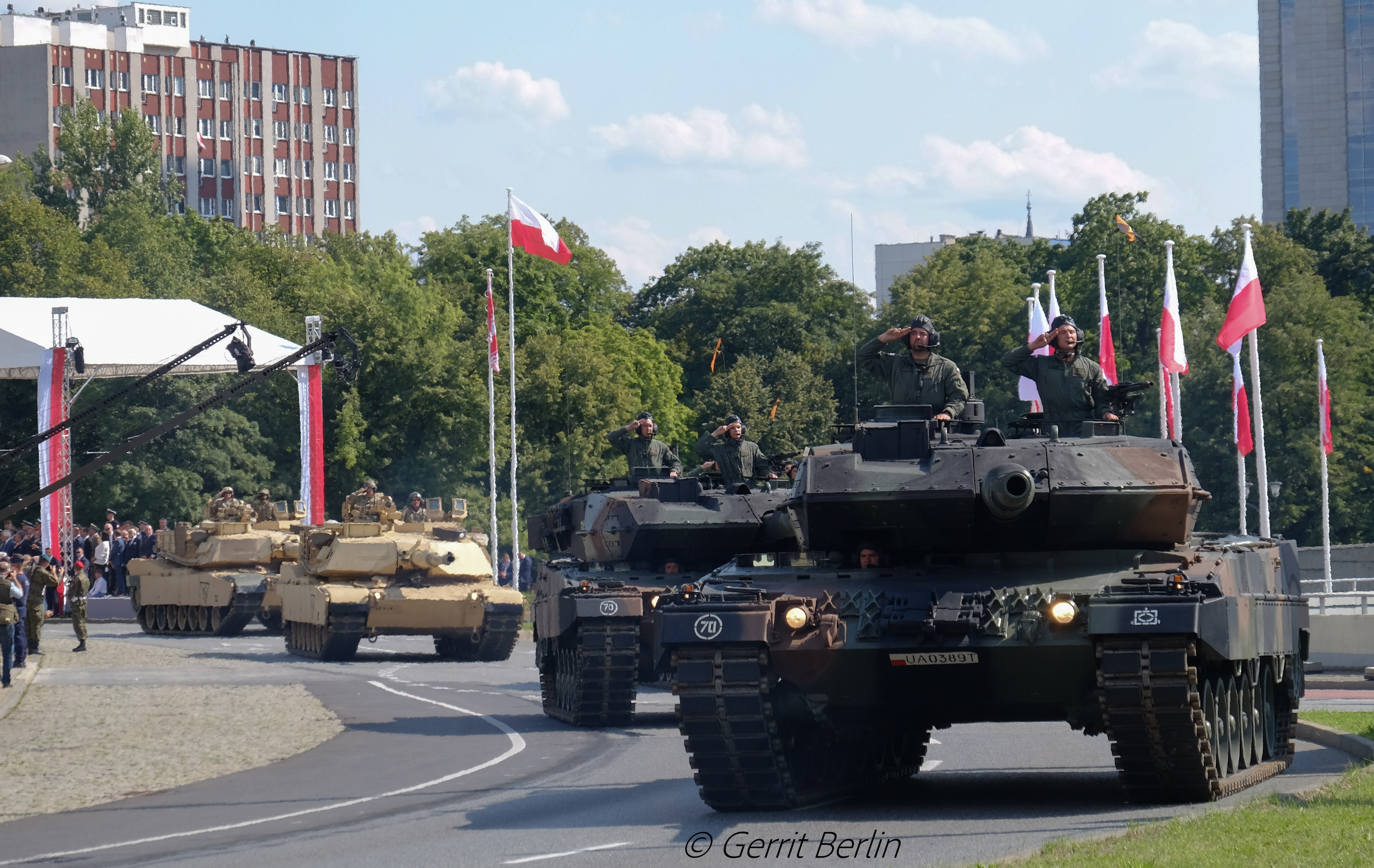
Polish Leopard 2 tanks in 2019

== See also ==
- Feast of the Assumption
- Polish Independence Day
- Unity Day (Russia), commemorates the popular uprising which ended the Polish occupation of Moscow
