= Sobański Palace, Warsaw =

Sobański Palace
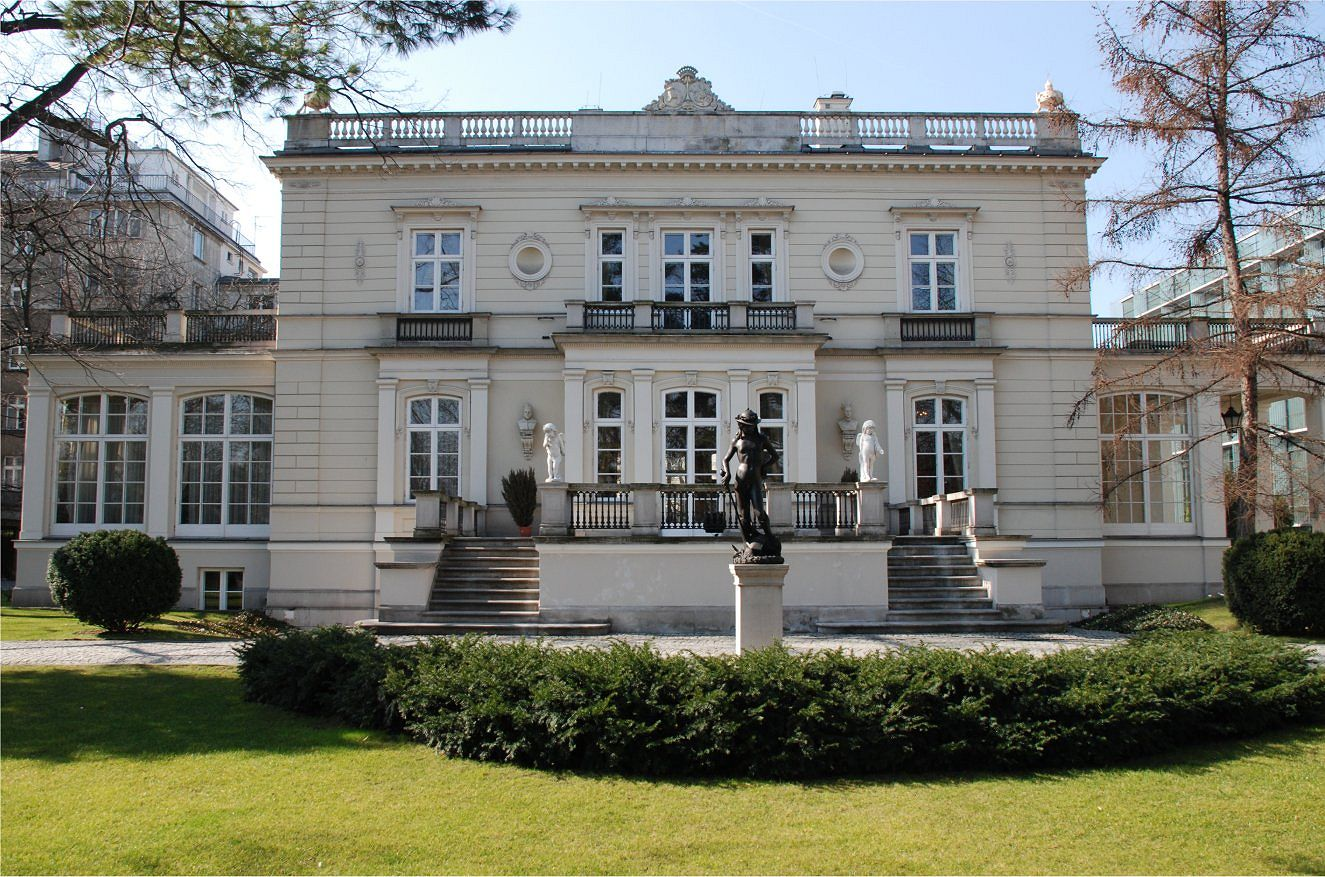
- Sobański Palace

- Location of Sobański Palace in Poland
- 52°13′17″N 21°01′26″E
- Location: Warsaw, Masovian Voivodeship; in Poland

History
- Built: 1876

Site notes
- Architectural style: Renaissance Revival

The Sobański Palace (Polish: Pałac Sobiańskich w Warszawie) is a historical building, located on Ujazdów Avenue in Warsaw, Poland.

== History ==
The building was constructed in 1876, under Polish architect Leandro Marconi's plans. In the 1930s, the palace's gardens were sold for the construction of a new road - the Avenue of Friends (Aleja Przyjaciół). During the Polish People's Republic, the building housed the headquarters for the Front of National Unity, proceeded by the Patriotic Movement for National Rebirth.

In the 1990s, the building served as the centre for the Solidarity Citizens' Committee, later for the Institute of Lech Wałęsa. In 1996, the building was purchased by Jan Wejchert, Polish billionaire media mogul and founder of TVN Group. Presently, the palace houses the Polish Business Council (Polska Rada Biznesu) and a restaurant.

== Gallery ==
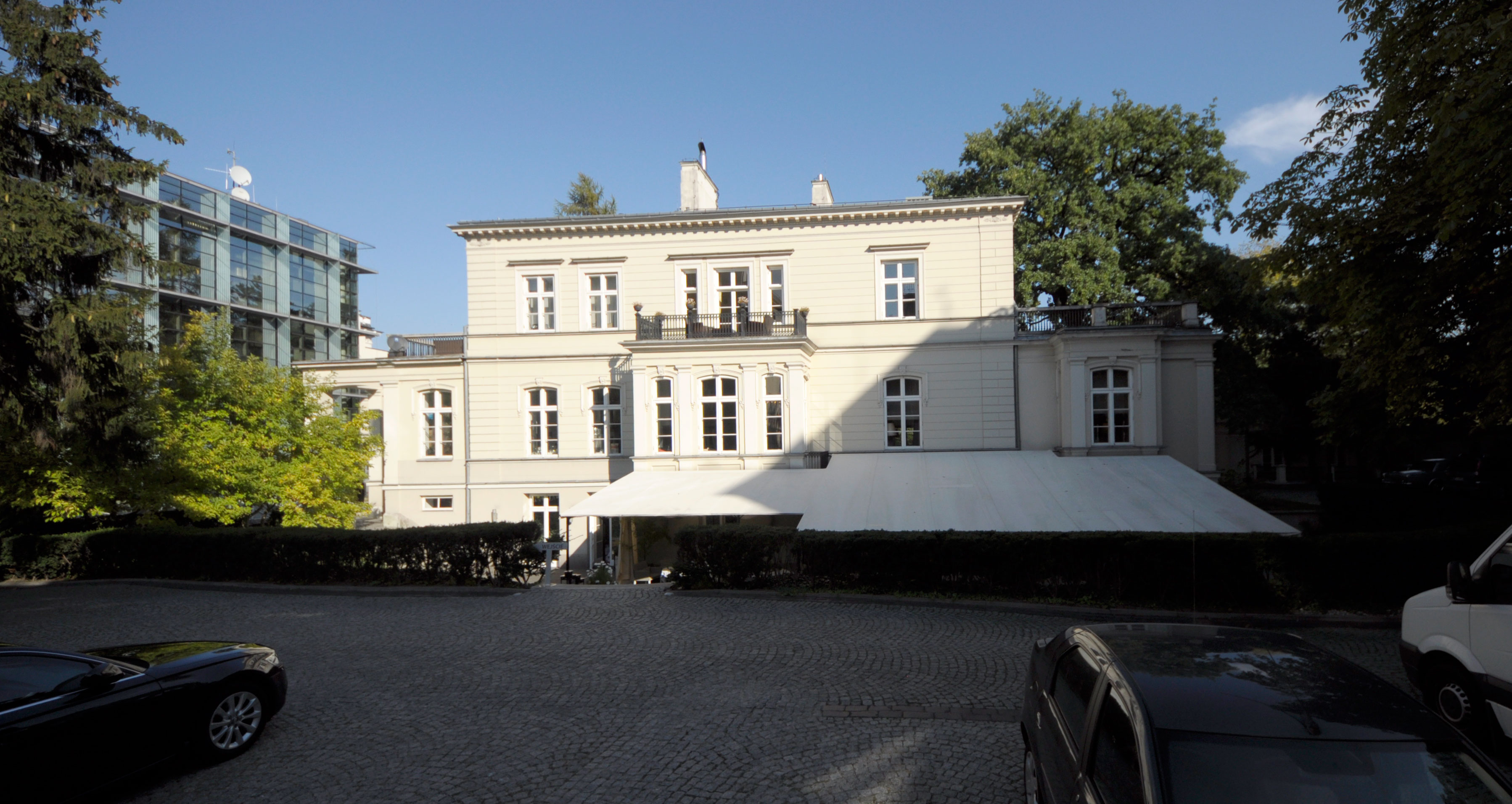
Entrance of Sobański Palace

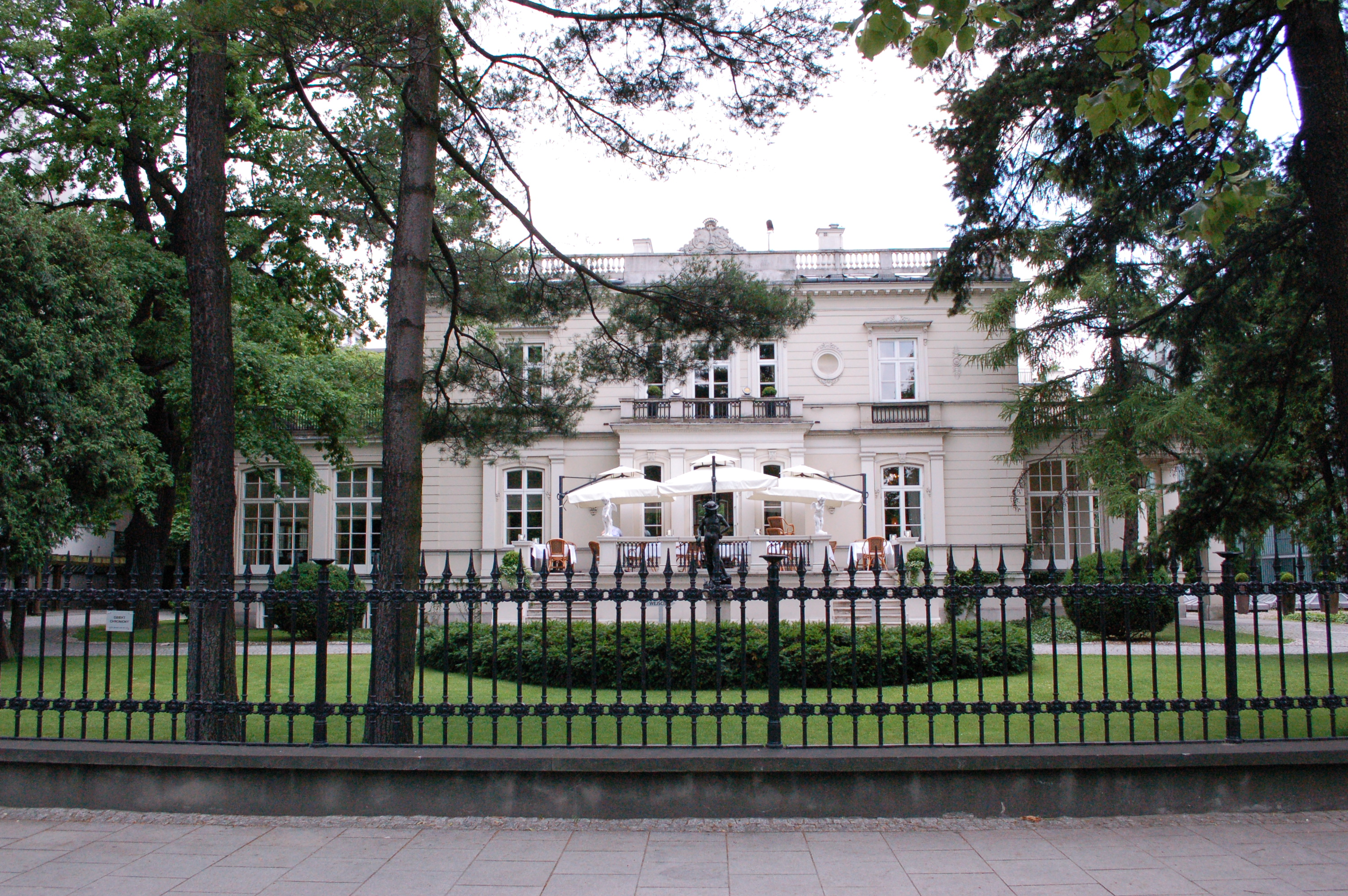
Garden view of Sobański Palace

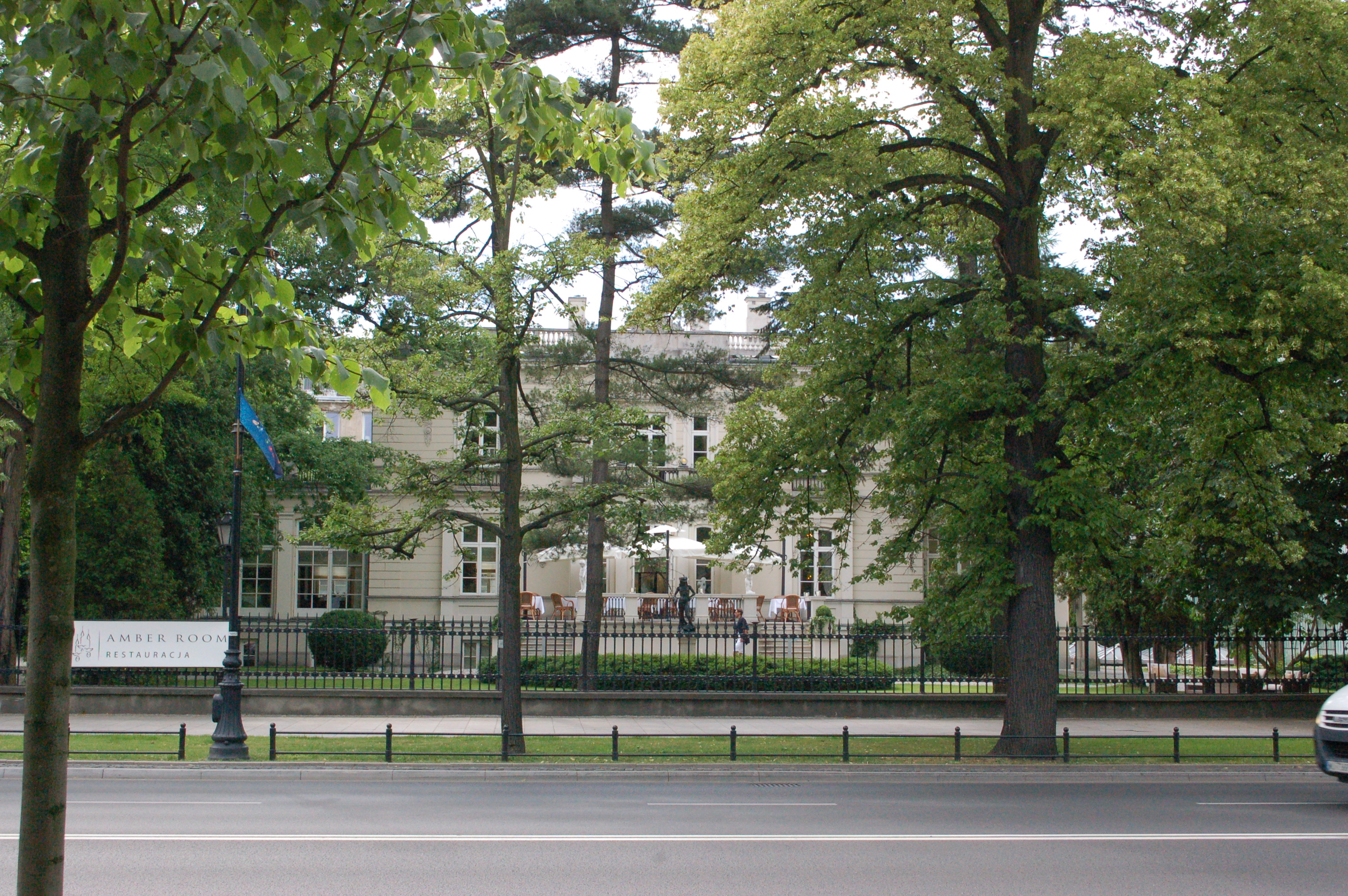
View from Ujazdów Avenue

== See also ==
- Sobański Palace in Guzów
- Sobański family
- List of palaces in Poland
