= Chopol =

Polish–North Korean maritime transport company

Chopol 조선-뽈스까해운회사 Korean-Polish Shipping Society
- Company type: State-owned enterprise
- Industry: Transportation
- Founded: [1965], 1987
- Founder: governments of DPRK and Poland
- Defunct: July 12, 2018
- Fate: Liquidated
- Headquarters: Pyongyang, Gdynia
- Area served: Southeast Asia
- Services: Freight forwarding

Chopol (조뽈), Chopolship, the Korean-Polish Shipping Society Chopol (Korean: 조선-뽈스까해운유한책임회사, Polish: Koreańsko-Polskie Towarzystwo Żeglugowe) was a Polish-North-Korean company that dealt in the maritime transport of goods, established during the communist Polish People's Republic era. It was the only company with Polish capital that operated in North Korea. It had a seat in Pyongyang, North Korea, and a branch in Gdynia, Poland.

== History ==
The company's history began in 1965, when the Korean-Polish Society of Brokers (조선-뽈스까중개인협회, Koreańsko-Polskie Towarzystwo Maklerów) was established, dealing in trade in sea cargo. It was transformed into Chopol.

The company was established in 1987 in order to maintain a constant trade exchange. It was supposed to bring magnesite to the Polish People's Republic, while Polish coke was to be transported to North Korea. The company had a small fleet, initially consisting of several vessels (including Pukchang, Pong Su), but eventually only one — the Chopol 2 bulk carrier, which cruised mainly in the region of Southeast Asia. The crew of the ship were exclusively Koreans.

During its activity, the company dealt with transport (except for assumed goods, i.e. coke and magnesite), including: rice, sugar and wood.

The company was liquidated on July 12, 2018.
