= Koreans in Poland =

Ethnic group

Koreans in Poland Koreańczycy w Polsce 재폴란드 한인
Total population
- 3,447 South Koreans (2026); 1 North Korean (2026)

Regions with significant populations
- South Koreans: Warsaw, Wrocław; North Koreans (historically): Gdańsk, Gdynia, Sopot

Languages
- Korean, Polish

Religion
- Christianity, Zen Buddhism

Related ethnic groups
- Korean diaspora

Koreans in Poland do not form a very large population. As of 2025, they consist of around 3 to 5 thousand South Koreans.

== Migration history ==
=== Pre–World War II and communist era ===
According to the 1921 Polish census, one Korean person was noted in the city of Równe. Some of Poland's first Korean residents were believed to have come as staff members of the Japanese embassy in the 1930s, when Korea was a part of the Japanese Empire. One, a dentist named Yu Dong-ju, stayed behind in Poland after World War II and began teaching the Korean language to local East Asian studies students; however, he ceased teaching upon the arrival of officially-dispatched language teachers sent by the newly established North Korean government. During the Korean War, after North Korea's request, Poland took in and offered education to 1,400 North Korean children and youth, mostly orphans. They were housed in Gołotczyzna, Świder, Płakowice, Szklarska Poręba and Bardo. 350 children returned to North Korea in 1956–1958, and the remainder returned in 1959 by decision of Kim Il Sung. North Korea also sent some students to Poland over the years. In May 1989, while Poland and South Korea were still making overtures towards establishing full diplomatic relations with each other, two North Korean exchange students in Poland, Kim Un-hak and Tong Yŏng-jun, held a press conference to announce their defection to the South.

=== Post-communist era ===
As of 2006, an estimated 75 North Koreans were employed at various Polish firms in the Baltic Sea coastal towns of Gdańsk, Gdynia, and Sopot, including some working as welders at the famous Gdańsk Shipyard where the Solidarity trade union was founded. The workers' salaries are paid to a holding company which is suspected to share the money with the North Korean government. The workers are accompanied by supervisors who speak fluent Polish but do not share in their work. They live in a dormitory in Olszynka and are taken directly to their job by bus; they have no contact with their neighbours. There were also some working for no pay in Kleczanów, on the farm of Stanislaw Dobek, the president of the Polish-Korean Friendship Association. When informed of the long hours the workers were required to put in, seven days a week, and the possibility that their salaries were directly funding the North Korean regime, Ministry of Labour and Social Policy vice-minister Kazimierz Kuberski claimed that there was nothing he could do. In June 2008, North Korea dispatched a further 42 labourers to cities in northwestern Poland to engage in construction work. In 2016 a report concluded that as many as 800 North Koreans worked in Poland and that North Korea earned £1.6 billion a year from workers sent abroad worldwide (£1 billion in another source). As of 2026, it seems that only one North Korean citizen remains in Poland.

The community of South Koreans in Poland is not very large; between 1997 and 2005, their numbers fell by nearly four-tenths, from 825 to 516, before rebounding to 1,034 by 2009, according to the statistics of South Korea's Ministry of Foreign Affairs and Trade. MOFAT statistics continued to record growth after that, showing 1,156 Koreans living in Poland in 2011, up by 11% from the 2009 survey. 52 were permanent residents, 248 were international students, and the remaining 856 had other types of visas. The LG Group and other South Korean electronics companies have established factories in Wrocław, and sent a number of Korean expatriate staff to live there. During the startup of these companies (in 2007) they had trouble finding local workers and considered to obtain permission to import guest workers from China. As of 2025, the number of South Koreans officially residing in Poland is 3,447 people, however members of the diaspora in the Lower Silesian Voivodeship estimate that there's at least 5,000 of them. They are mostly concentrated in the suburbs of Wrocław, especially in the village of Bielany Wrocławskie

== Religion ==
The South Korean government lists one Korean Buddhist congregation and three Korean Christian churches in Warsaw, as well as two Korean Christian churches in Wrocław. According to the Buddha Dharma Education Association, there are a total of twelve Korean Zen Buddhist temples throughout Poland.
