= Ujazdów Avenue, Warsaw =

Street in Warsaw, Poland

Coordinates: 52.22131°N 21.02477°E

Ujazdów Avenue
- Aleje Ujazdowskie
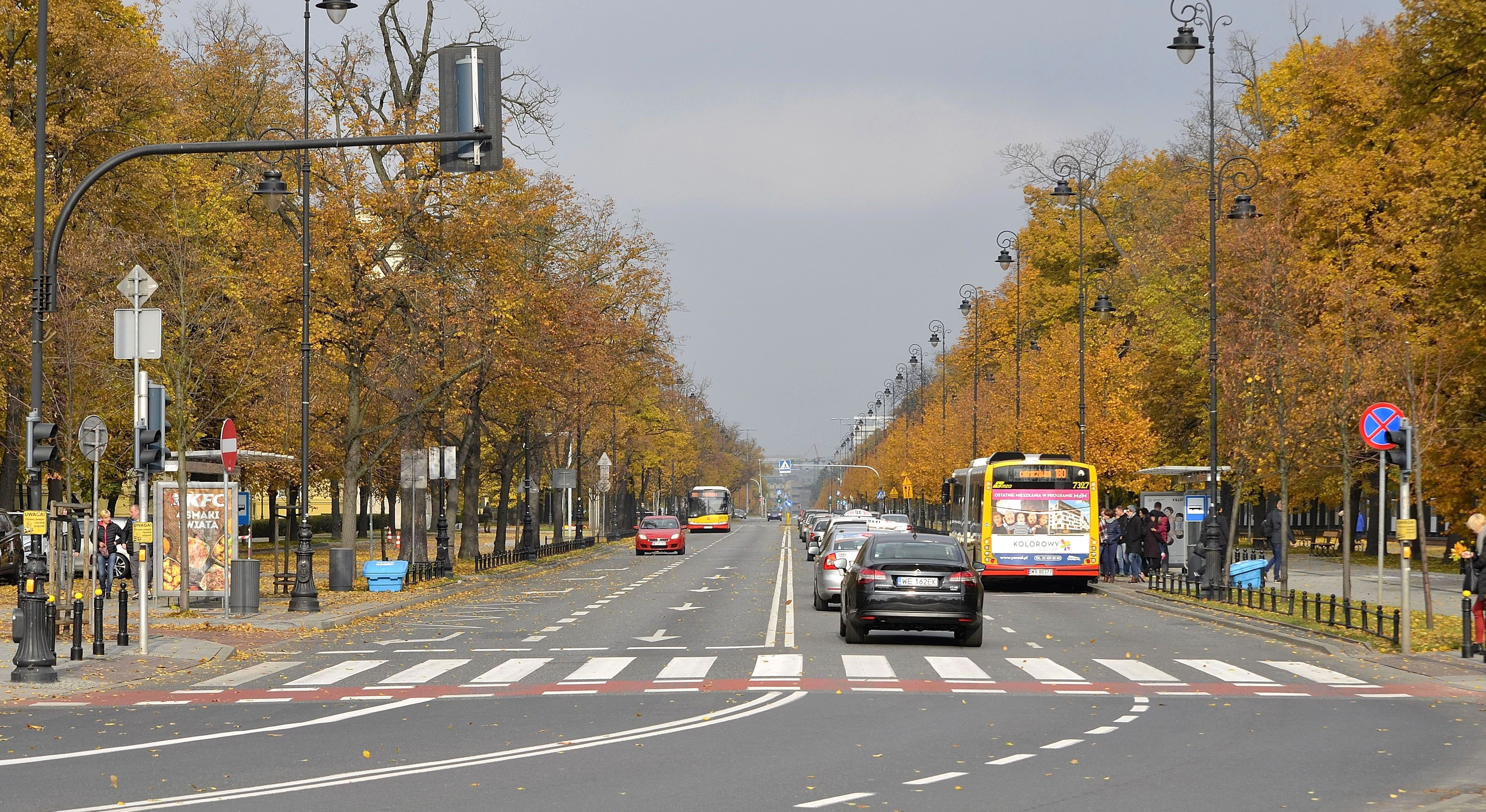
- Interactive map of Ujazdów Avenue
- Part of: Royal Route, Warsaw
- Namesake: Ujazdów
- Length: 1.6 km (0.99 mi)
- Area: Śródmieście, Warsaw
- Location: Warsaw
- Quarter: Śródmieście
- Nearest metro station: Politechnika
- Major junctions: pl. Trzech Krzyży

Other
- Known for: Chancellery of the Prime Minister of Poland

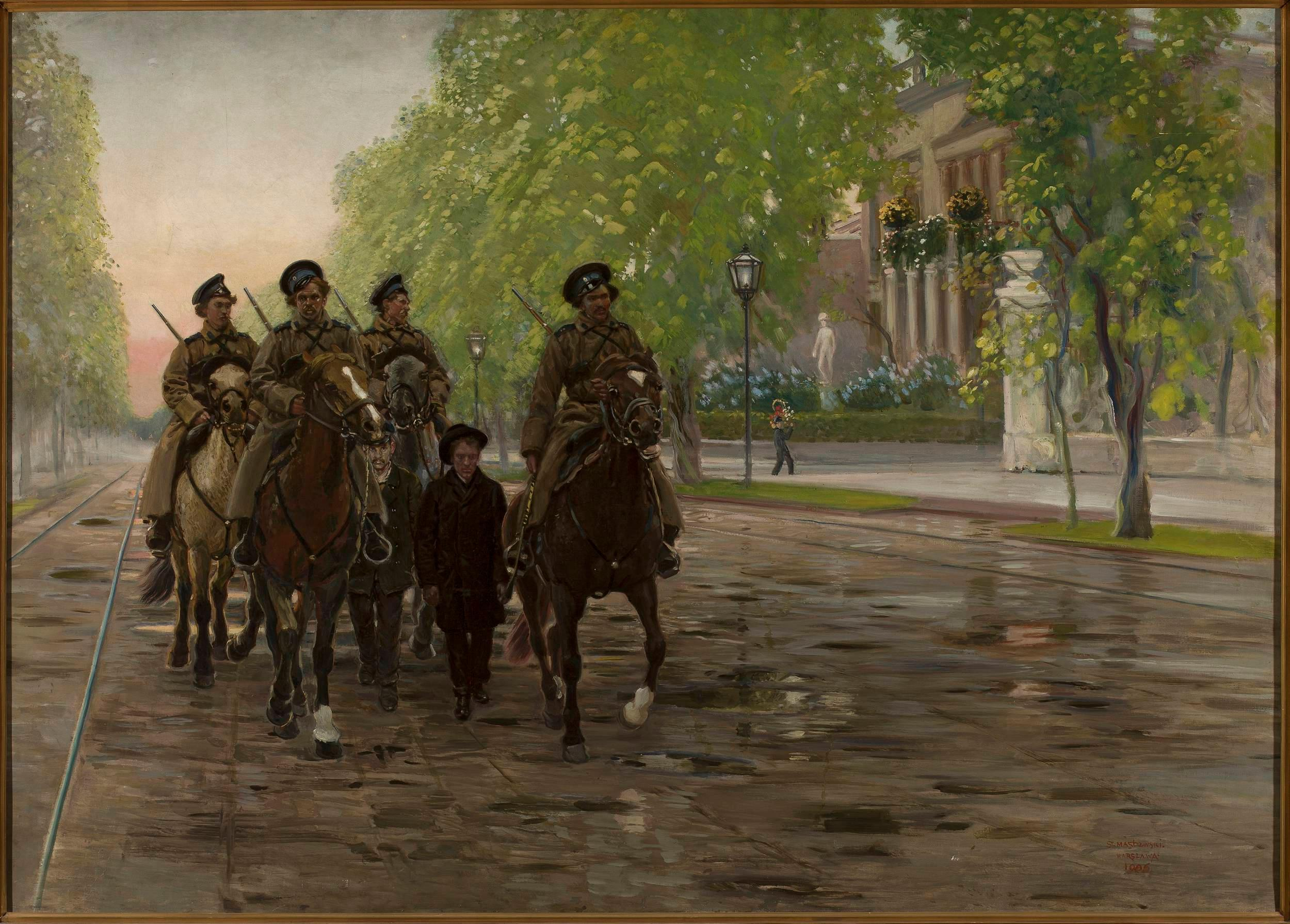
Stanisław Masłowski's 1906 painting Wiosna roku 1905 (Spring 1905) depicts Cossacks riding down Ujazdów Avenue.

Ujazdów Avenue (Polish: Aleje Ujazdowskie) is a major thoroughfare parallel to the Vistula River in the downtown district of Warsaw, Poland.

== History ==
The Avenue's origins date to 1724–31, when King Augustus II the Strong ordered the construction of a Calvary Road (Droga Kalwaryjska). By 1766 the route was part of the Royal Route as Belweder Avenue, leading to the Belweder Palace. In the second half of the 19th century, a number of Polish aristocrats' and industrialists' villas and palaces were built along the route. Following the restoration of Polish independence in 1918, the majority of these houses and mansions were transformed into foreign embassies. During World War II under the Nazi occupation, it was planned to be transformed into a German district, according to the so-called Pabst Plan. Nazi authorities renamed the avenue Lindenallee, and later Siegenallee. On 1 February 1944, Franz Kutschera, the SS Police Chief in German-occupied Warsaw was assassinated by members of the Polish resistance outside Ujazdów Avenue number 23 - an action known as Operation Kutschera.

During the Warsaw Uprising in 1944, the street and the surrounding buildings were mostly destroyed, however the majority of the historical residences and some tenements along the route survived. In the war's aftermath, the avenue experienced massive reconstruction, with works lasting until 1955. In 1953, following the death of Joseph Stalin, authorities renamed the thoroughfare as Stalin Avenue (Aleja Stalina). Three years later during the Polish October, a period of de-Stalinization, the avenue's traditional name was restored.

In September 1994, as part of the Royal Route, Ujazdów Avenue was included in Poland's official national List of Historical Monuments by President Lech Wałęsa. In 2009, Ujazdów Avenue underwent a complete renovation, with the planting of new trees, the complete reconstruction of sidewalks, bus turnouts, and creating bike paths for the route.

== Location ==
Located in the Śródmieście district, Ujazdów Avenue begins at Belweder Street and runs for 1.6 km to Three Crosses Square. The contemporary avenue is surrounded by many notable historical villas, parks and palaces, as well as politically important buildings. Notable landmarks along Ujazdów include the Chancellery of the Prime Minister, Ujazdów Castle, Ujazdów Park, Łazienki Park, the Botanical Gardens, the Ministry of Justice, St. Alexander's Church and several embassies, including those of Switzerland, the United States, the United Kingdom, New Zealand, Bulgaria, Lithuania and Montenegro.

In addition to street traffic, Ujazdów is also used for ceremonial purposes as a military parade route during Armed Forces Day, held annually on 15 August.

== Image gallery ==
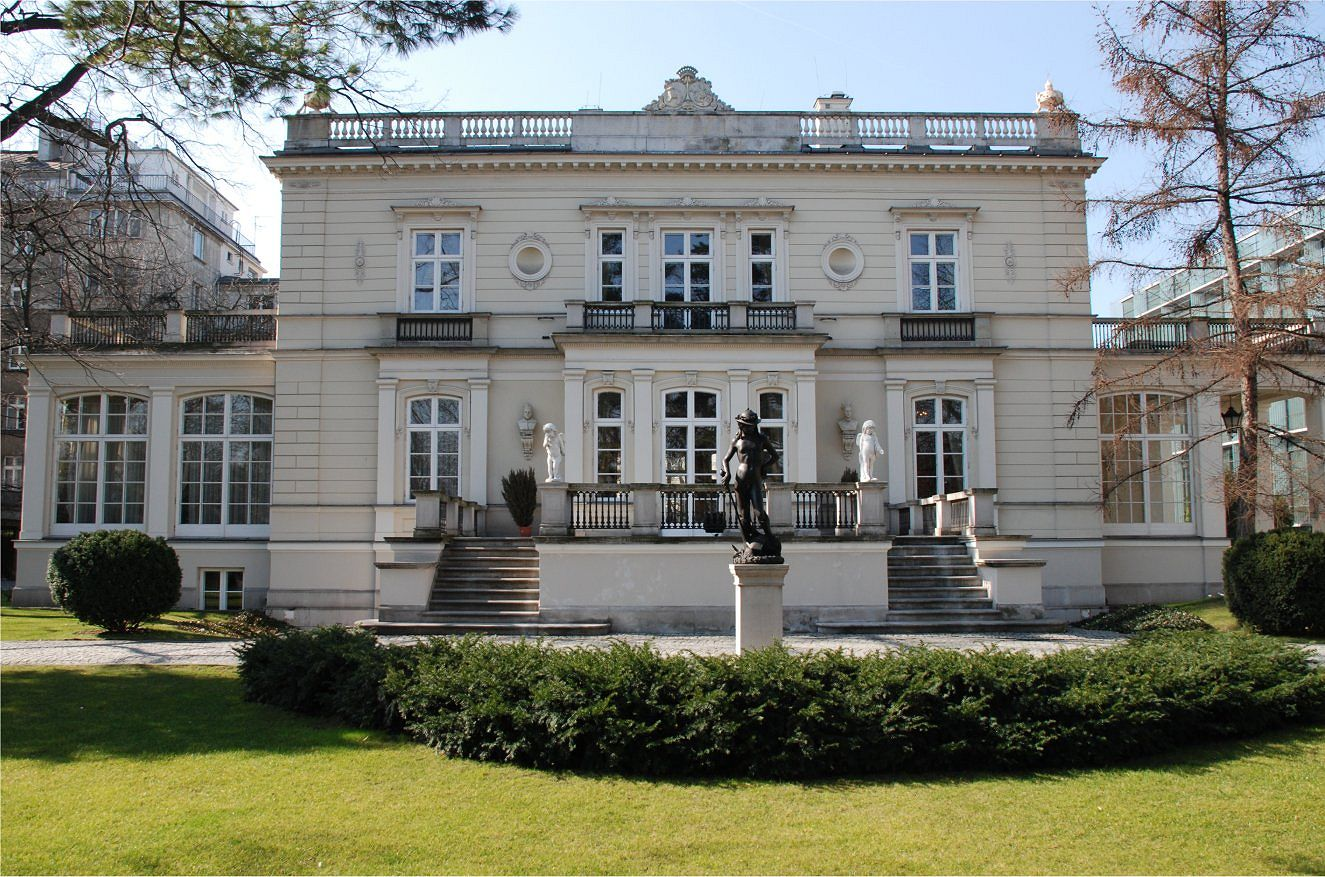
Sobański Palace

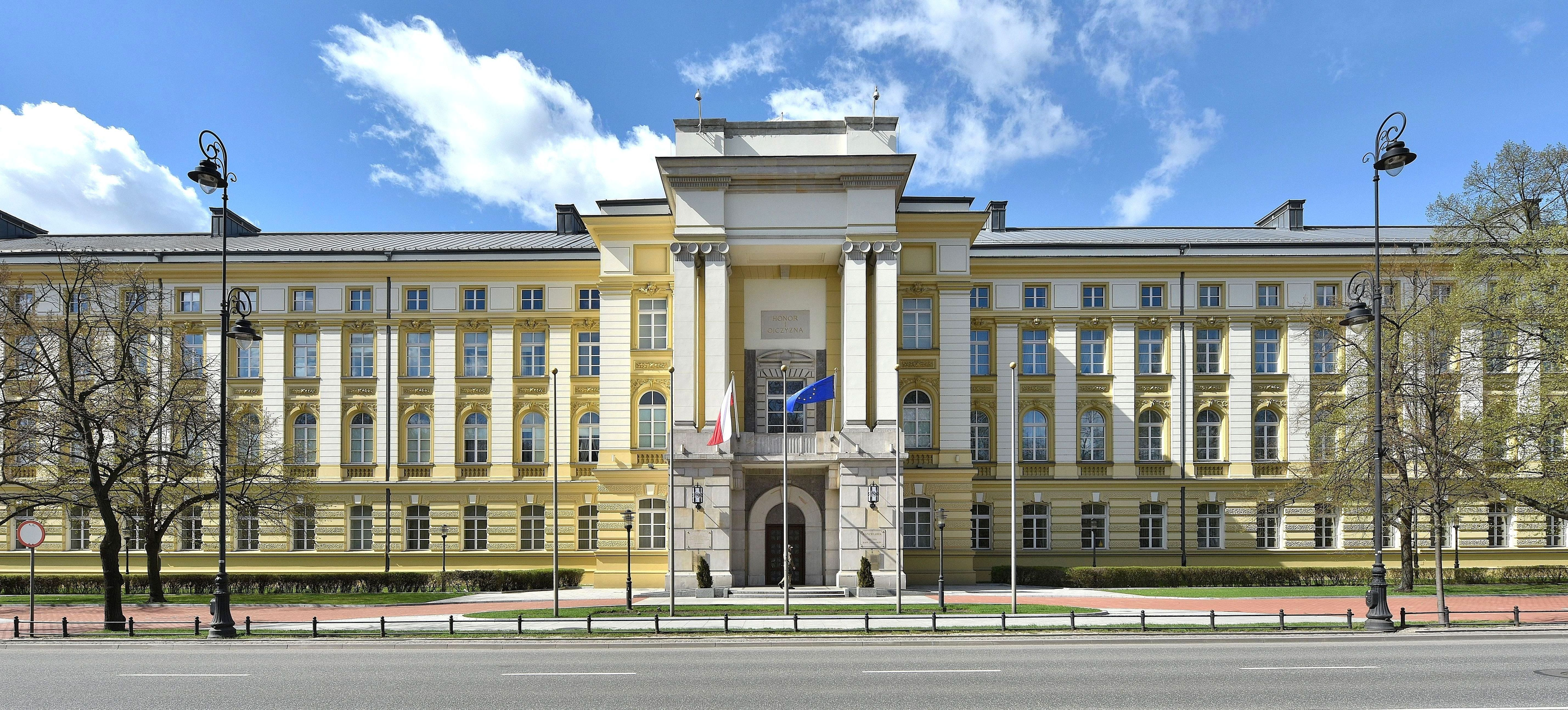
The Chancellery

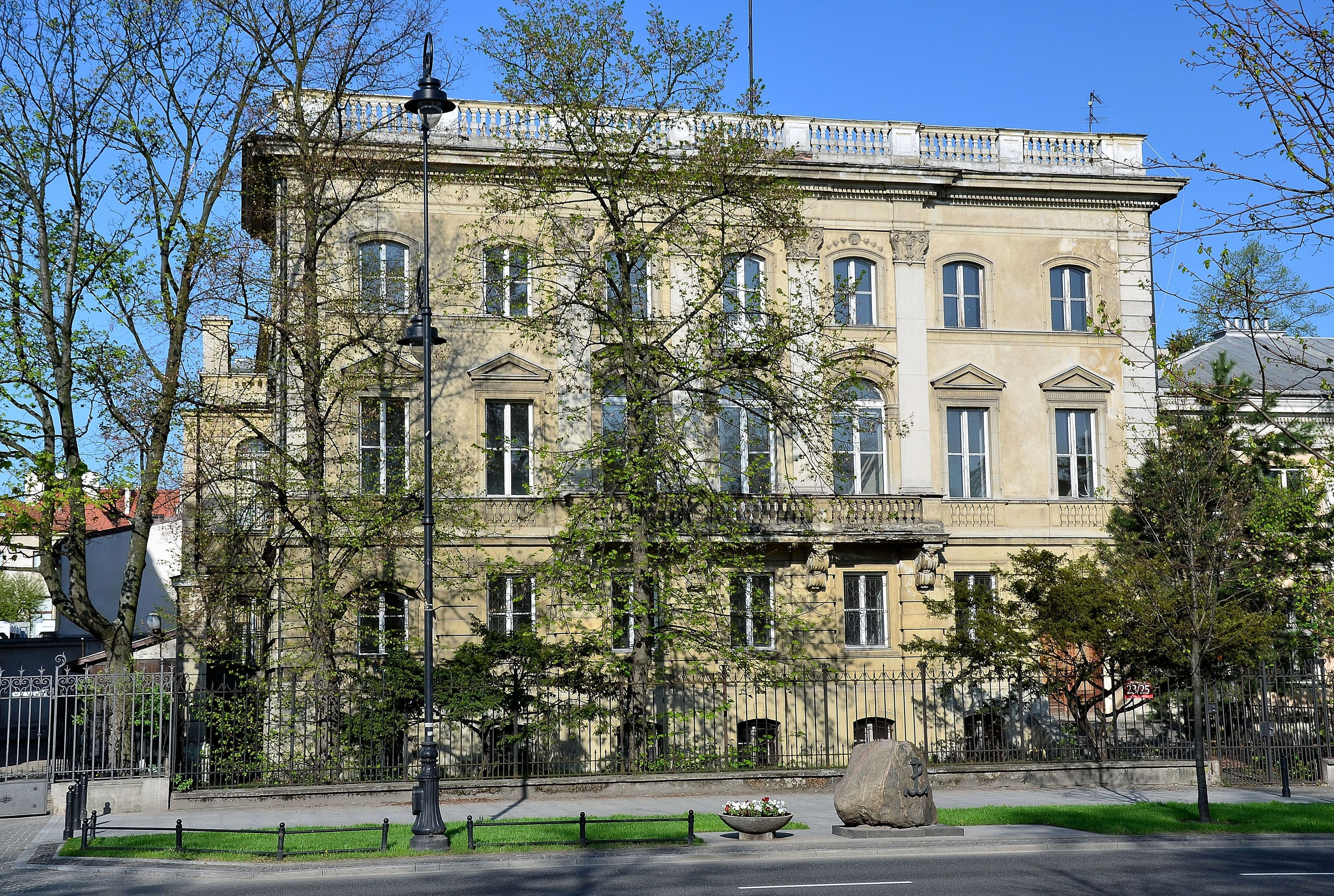
Leszczyński Palace

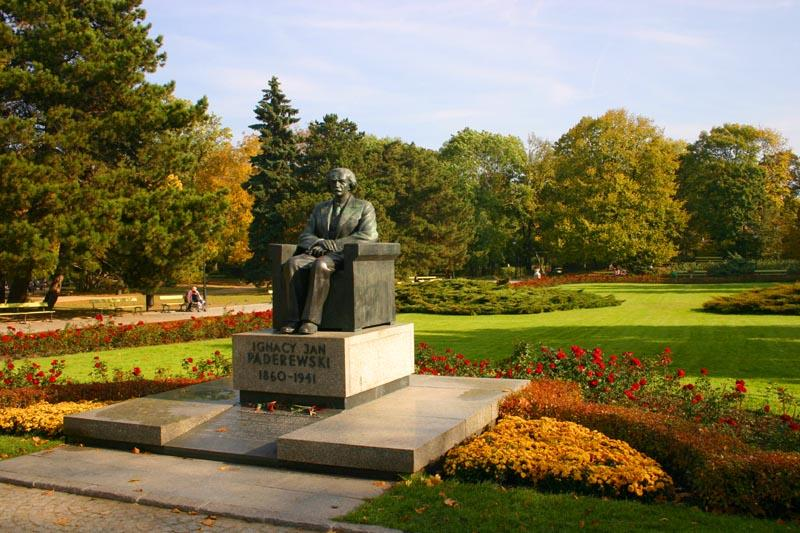
Ujazdów Park

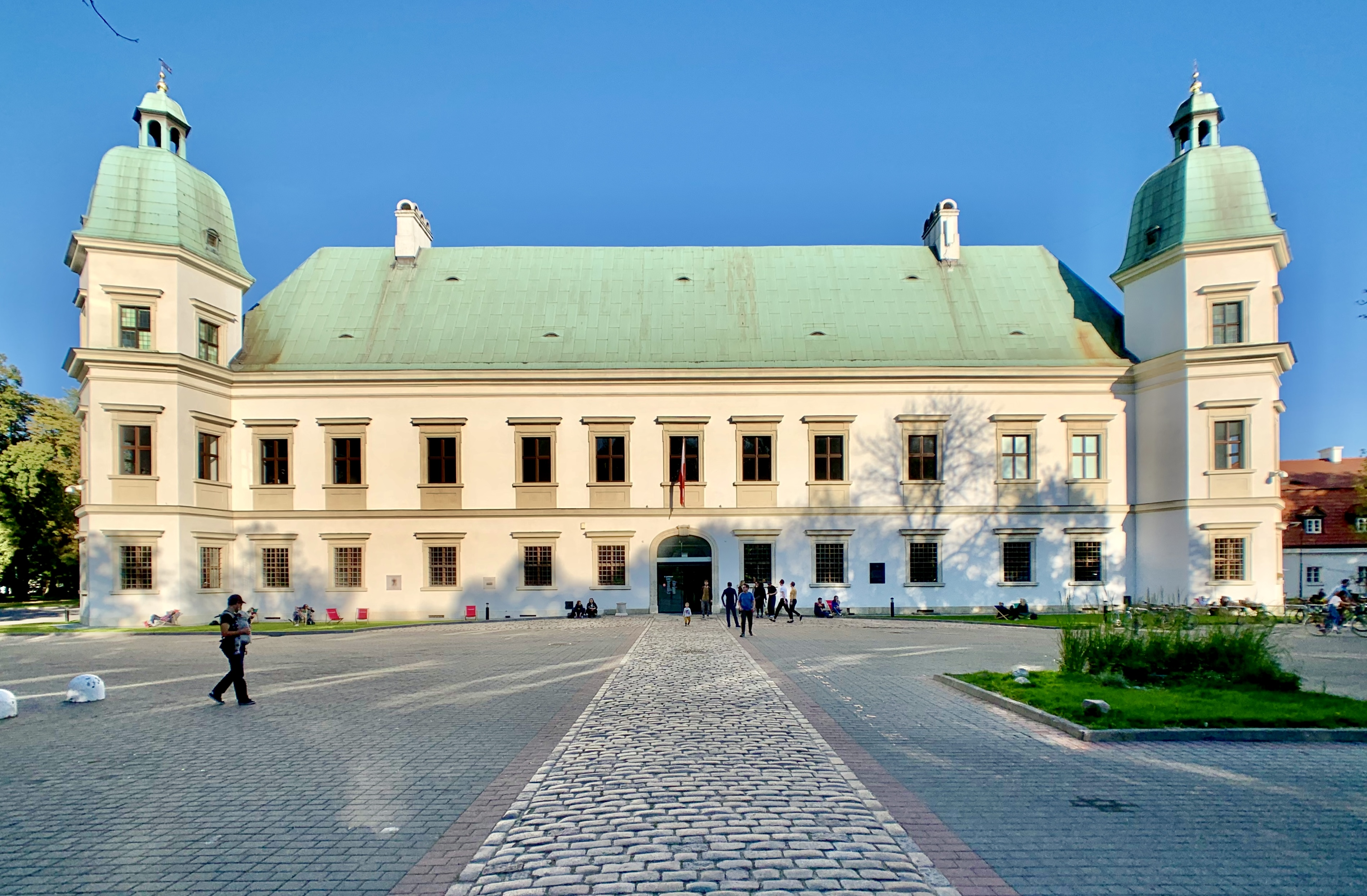
Ujazdów Castle

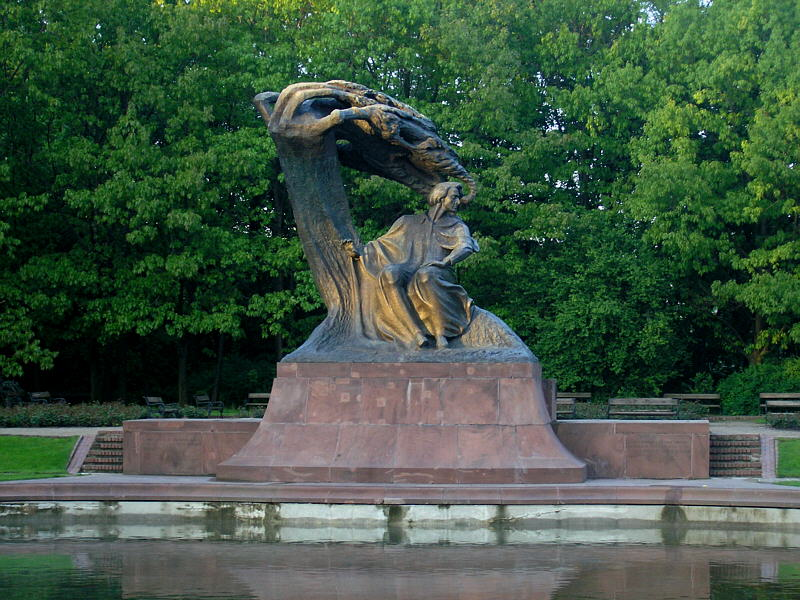
Chopin Statue

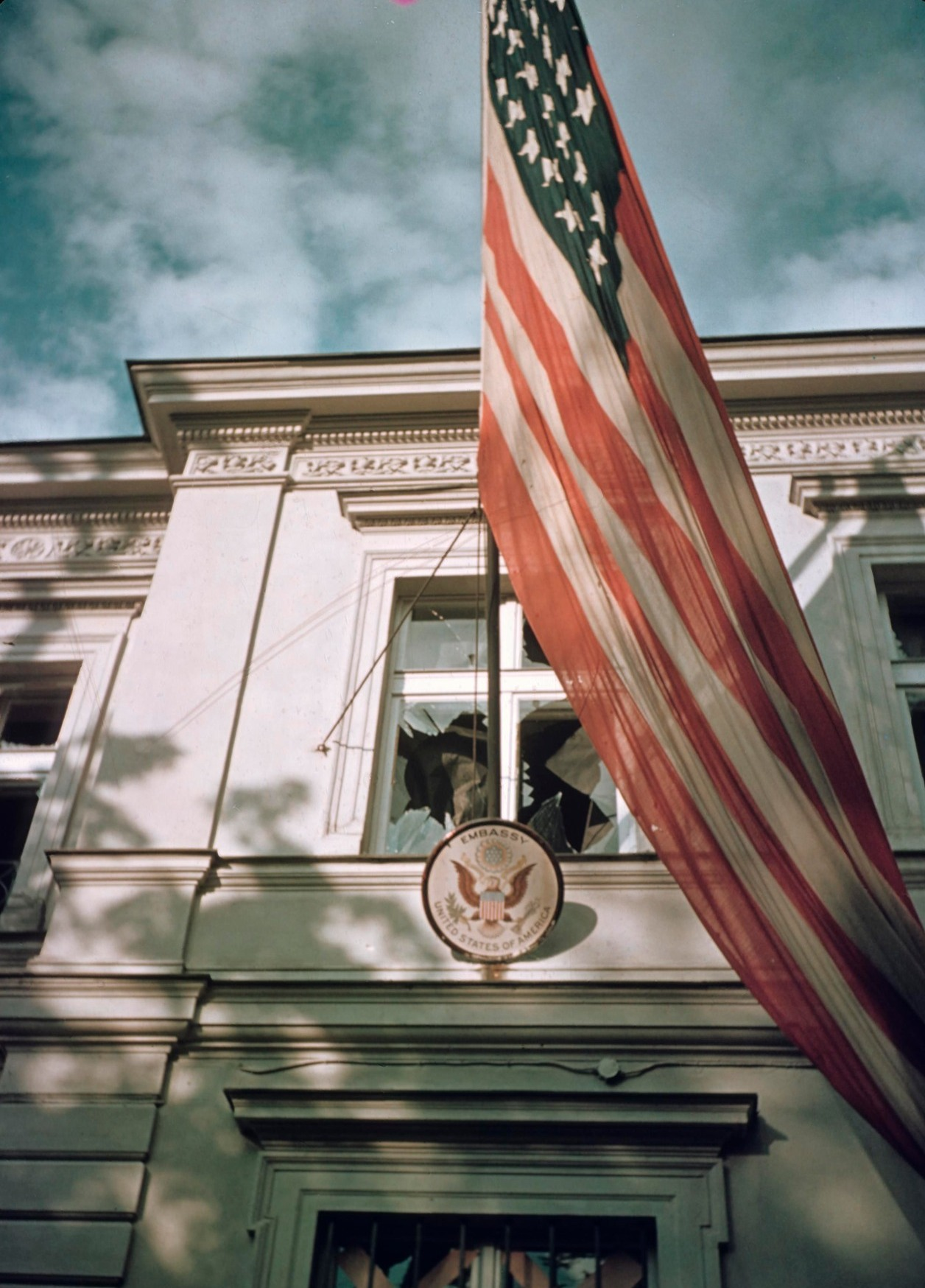
American embassy in Warsaw during German air raid in September 1939.

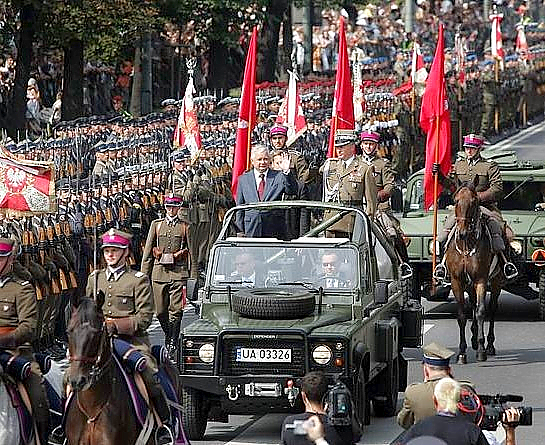
President Lech Kaczyński reviewing troops on Ujazdów Avenue during Armed Forces Day in 2007

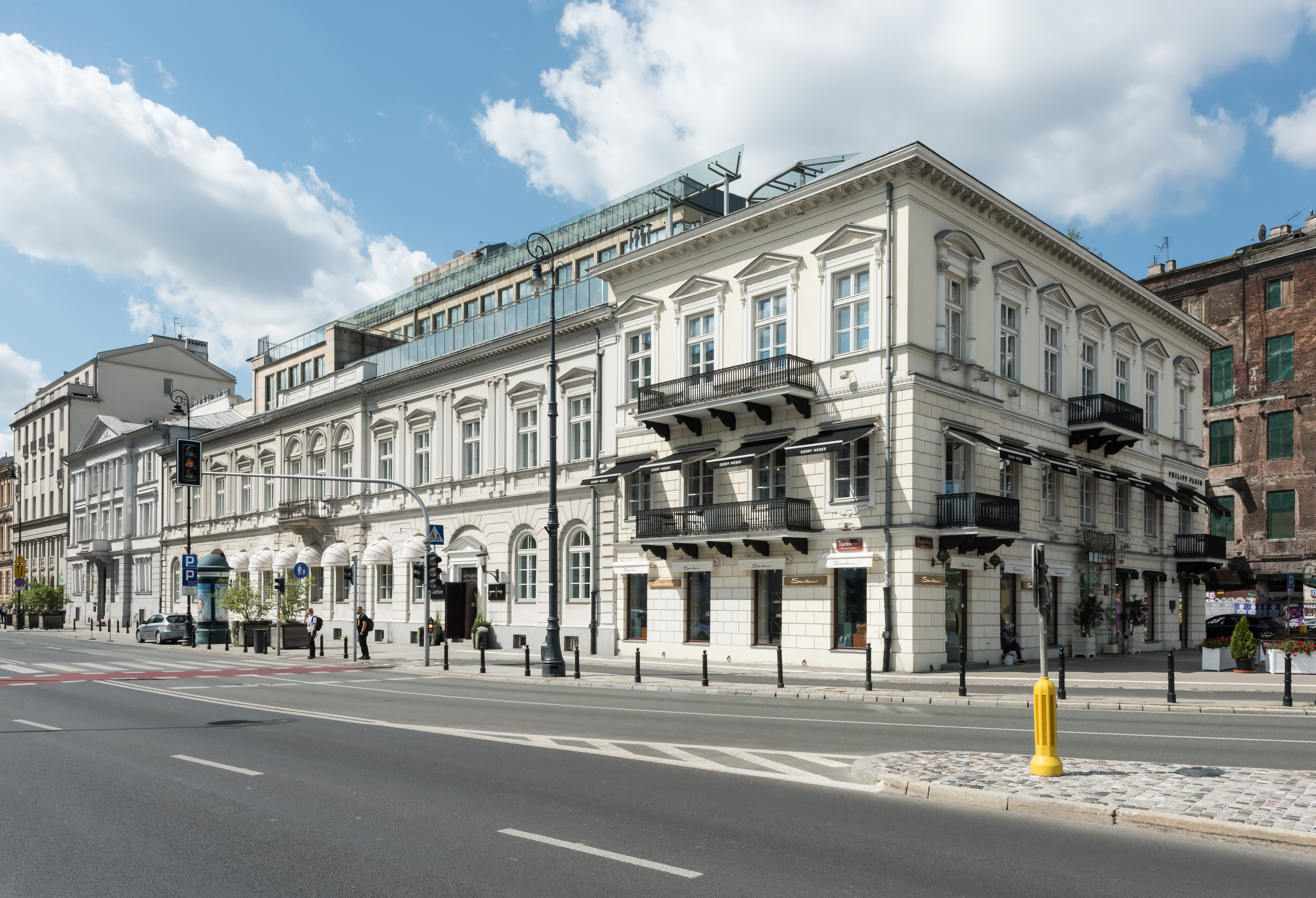
Dom Dochodowy building, seat of the Embassy of New Zealand

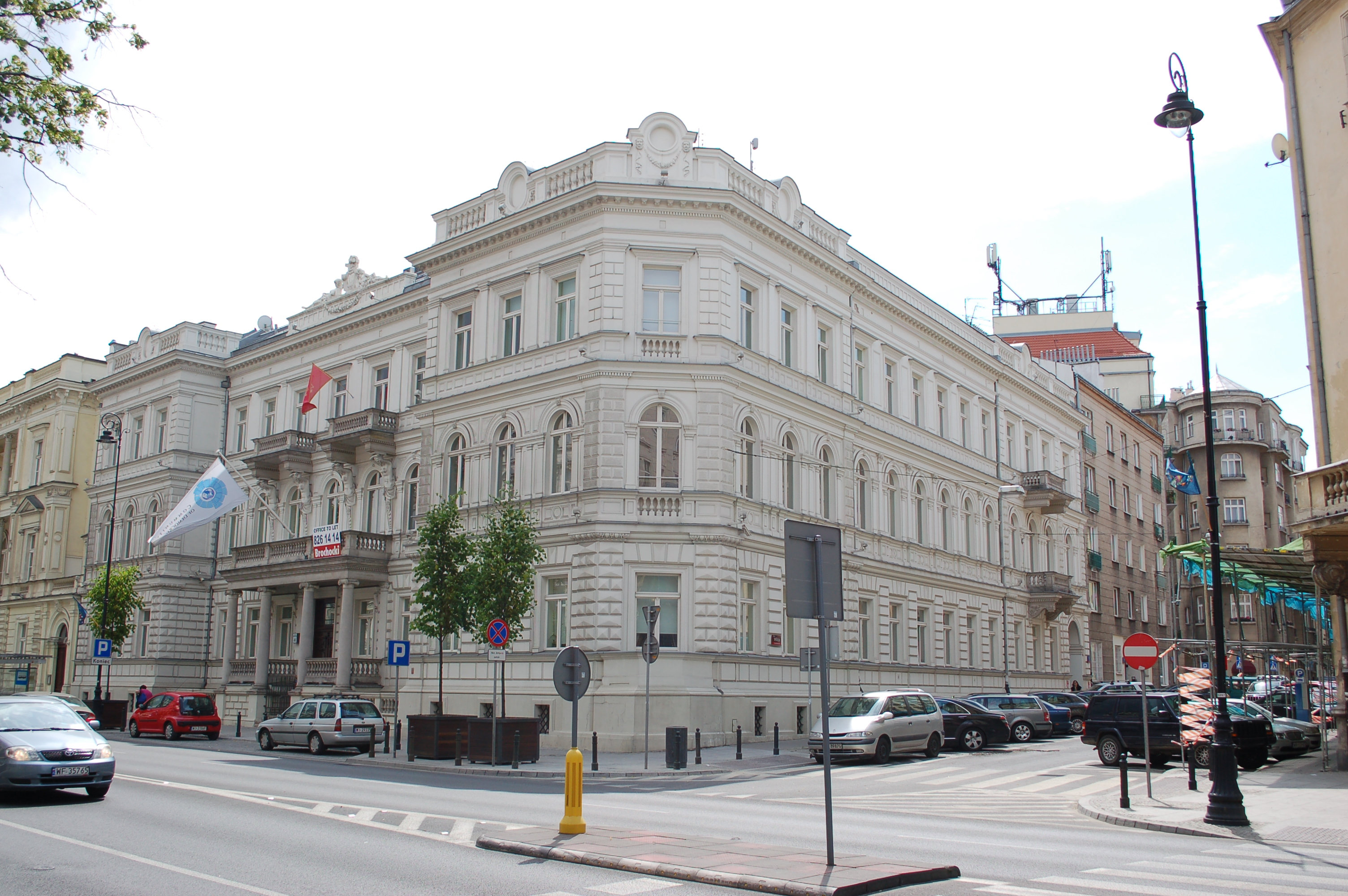
The official embassy of Montenegro

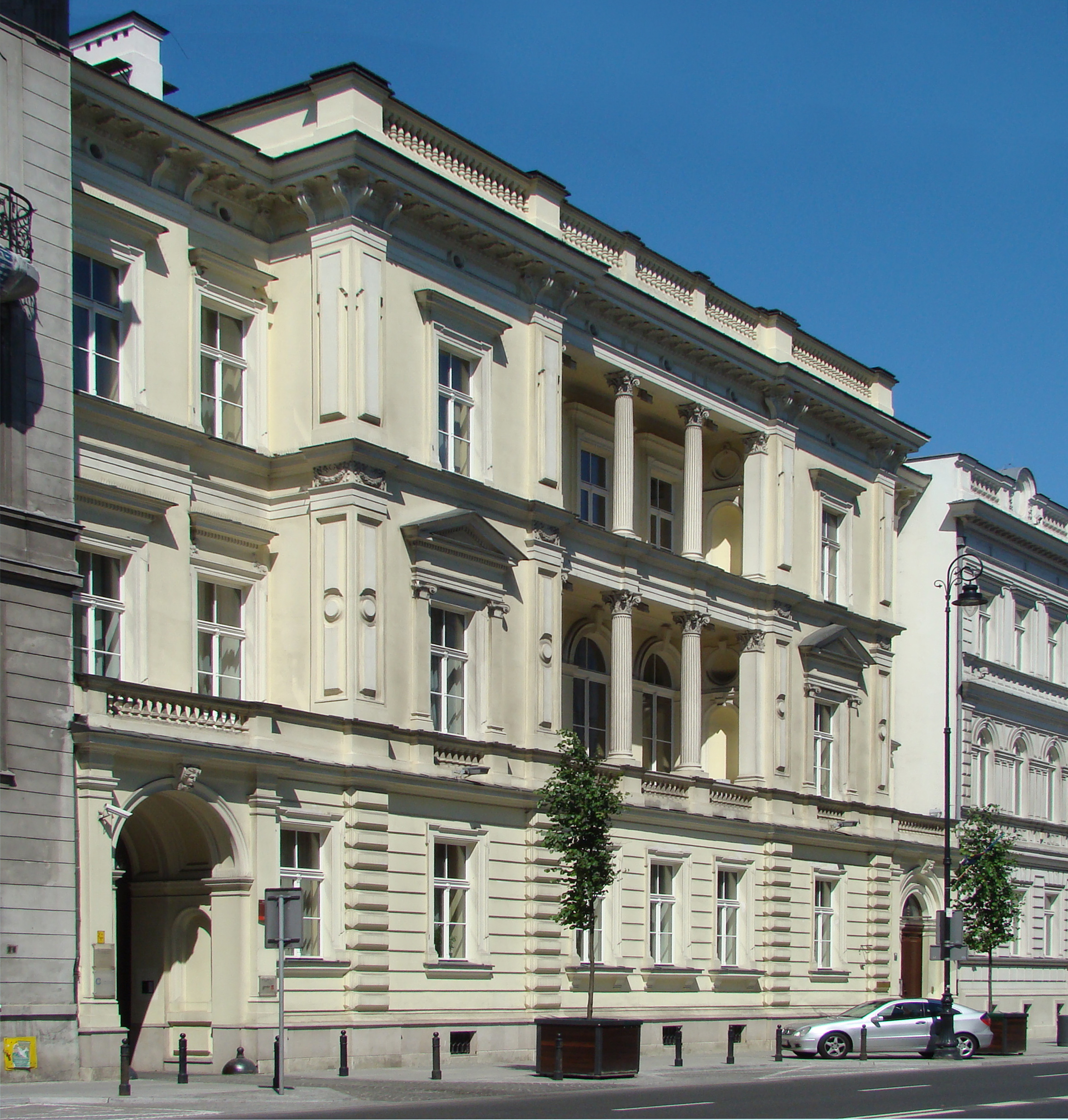
The German Historical Institute of Warsaw

== See also ==
- Marszałkowska Street
- Mokotowska Street
