= Poland–South Korea relations =

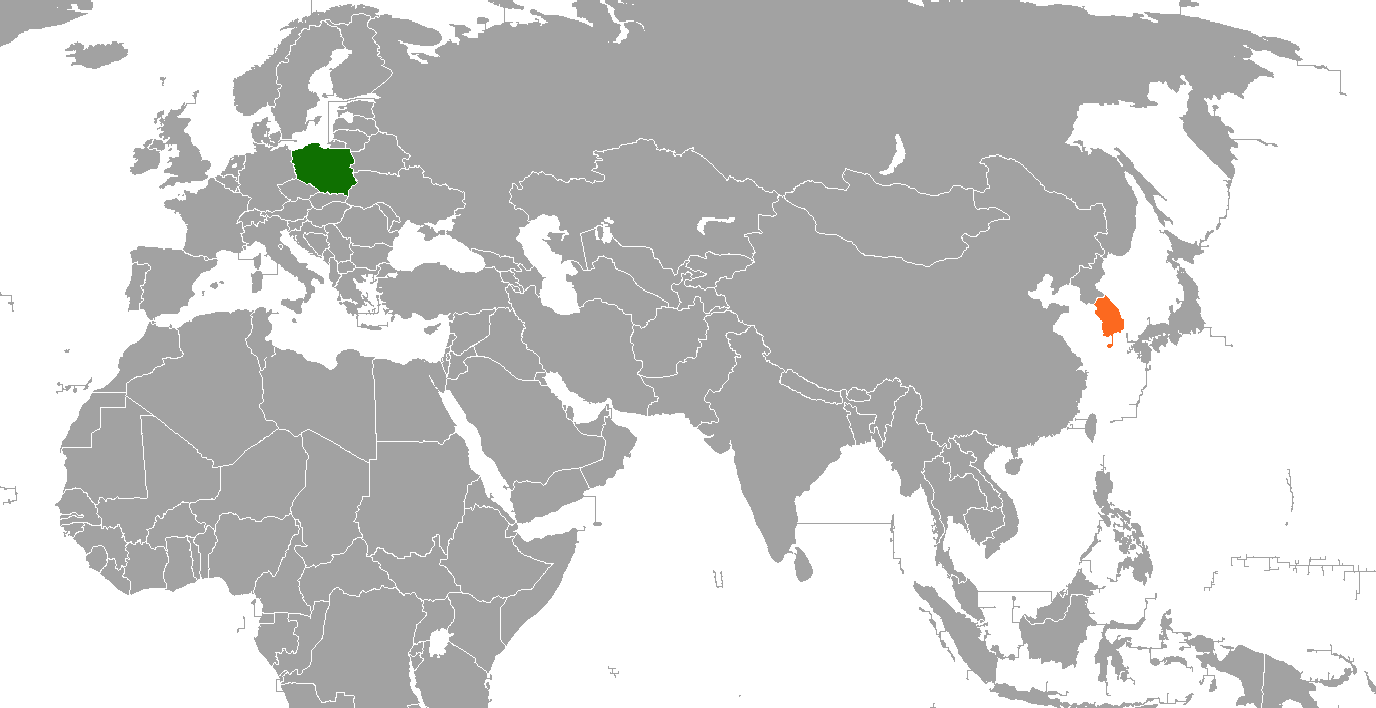
- Poland: South Korea

Diplomatic mission
- Embassy of Poland in Seoul: Embassy of South Korea, Warsaw

Poland–South Korea relations are the diplomatic relations between the Republic of Poland and Republic of Korea.

== History ==
Poland and Korea first had official contacts in the early 20th century, when both nations were ruled by foreign powers – Poland was partitioned between Austria-Hungary, Germany and Russia, while Korea was under Japanese rule. Due to suffering similar oppression, the Koreans and Poles shared strong sympathy, and the March 1st Movement, which aimed to form an independent Korea, made Koreans compared to the Poles of Asia.

As a result of World War II, both Poland and North Korea were occupied by the Soviet Union, which installed communist regimes in both countries. As a result, relations between the Polish People's Republic and Republic of Korea did not exist after the war, when the republics were established and aligned with opposing blocs in the Cold War. Poland supported North Korea against South Korea and virtually no relations between Poland and South Korea existed throughout the Cold War, in which the Democratic People's Republic of Korea was recognized by Polish People's Republic as the legitimate representative of all Korea. It was not until the 1990s when the Cold War ended that Poland and South Korea established relations.

== Modern relations ==
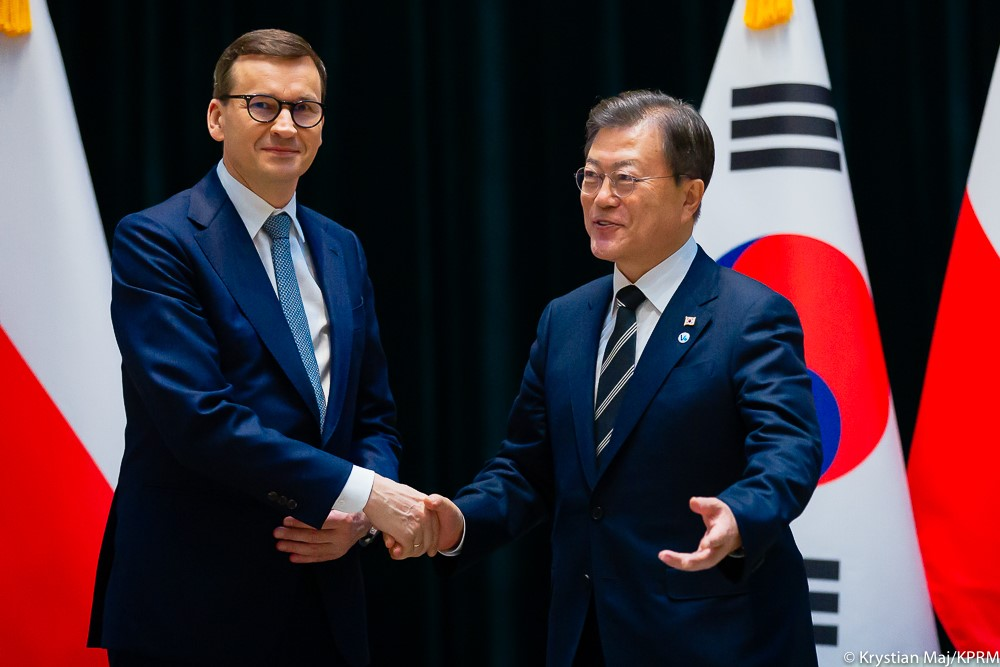
Prime Minister Mateusz Morawiecki and President Moon Jae-in during meeting in 2021

Following the end of Cold War, Poland and South Korea's relations dramatically improved and eventually became a strategic partnership. South Korea was the first Asian country to officially loan $450 million in economic aid to Poland. Investments from South Korea continues to increase as for the result of the good relationship between two countries. Poland is also a consumer of Korean networking technology and mobile communications technology.

In 2016, South Korea deputy minister of Foreign Affairs, Kim Hyong-zhin, praised Poland for its historical contributions to science and culture, and expressed South Korea's desire to expand the cooperative relationship between the two countries.

In 2018, Polish President Andrzej Duda expressed his wish to support a United Nations-led initiative over Korea, aiming for peaceful unification of the Korean peninsula.

In 2022, Poland and South Korea strengthened their military cooperation when Poland made a major purchase of K2 Black Panther tanks, K9 Thunder howitzers and FA-50 fighter jets from South Korea. The agreement also provides for technology transfer, the launch of production in Poland and joint Korean-Polish development of next-generation military equipment.

== Culture ==
Several Polish museums possess collections of Korean art and artifacts, including the National Museum of Ethnography in Warsaw and District Museum in Toruń.

== Trade ==
For South Korea, Poland is the largest trading partner in Central Europe, with two-way trade hitting an all-time high of $8.95 billion in 2022. The two countries aim to triple bilateral trade by 2030.

== Resident diplomatic missions ==
- Poland has an embassy in Seoul, and an honorary consulate in Daegu.
- South Korea has an embassy in Warsaw, and an honorary consulate in Wrocław.
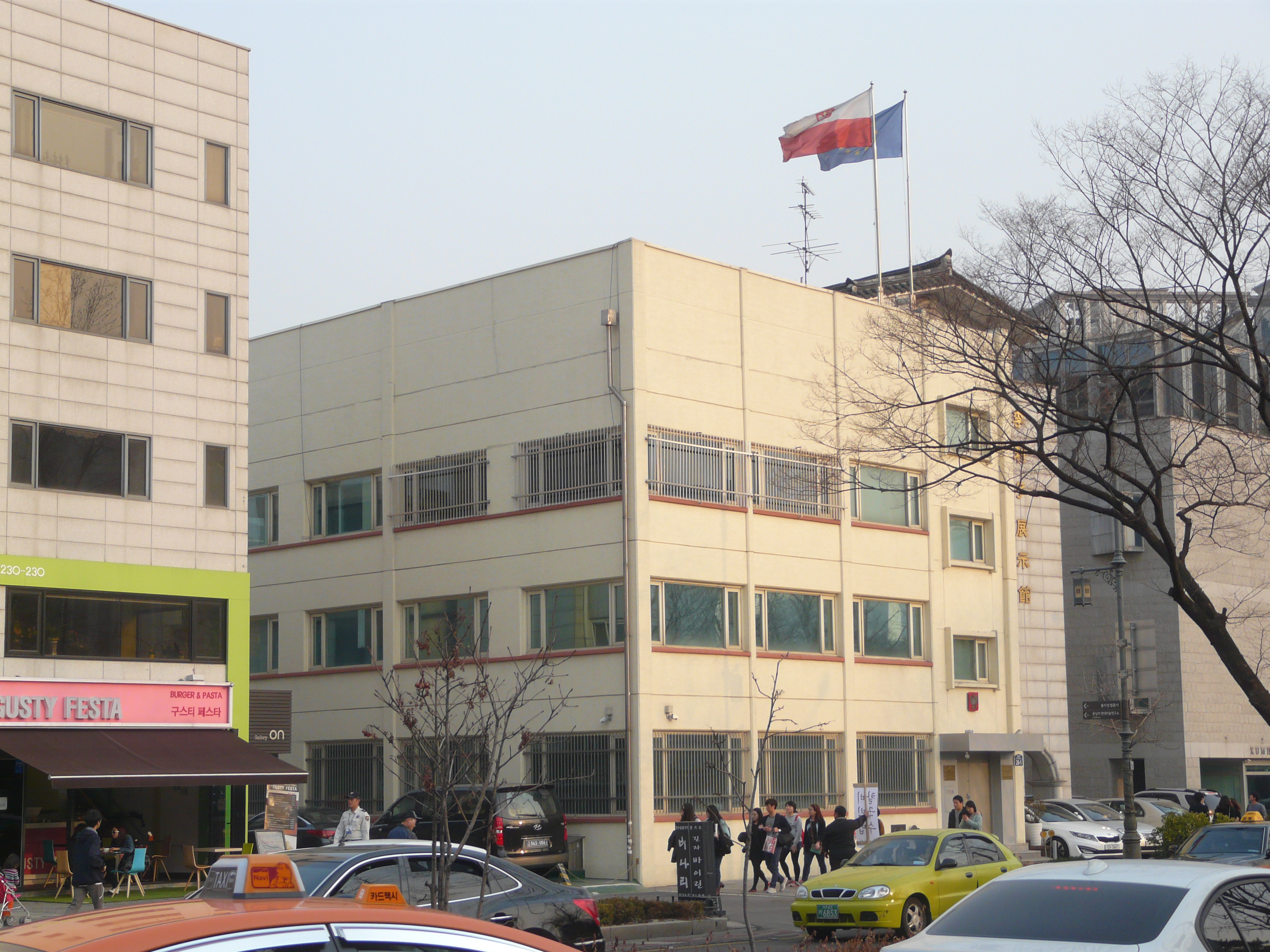
Embassy of Poland in Seoul

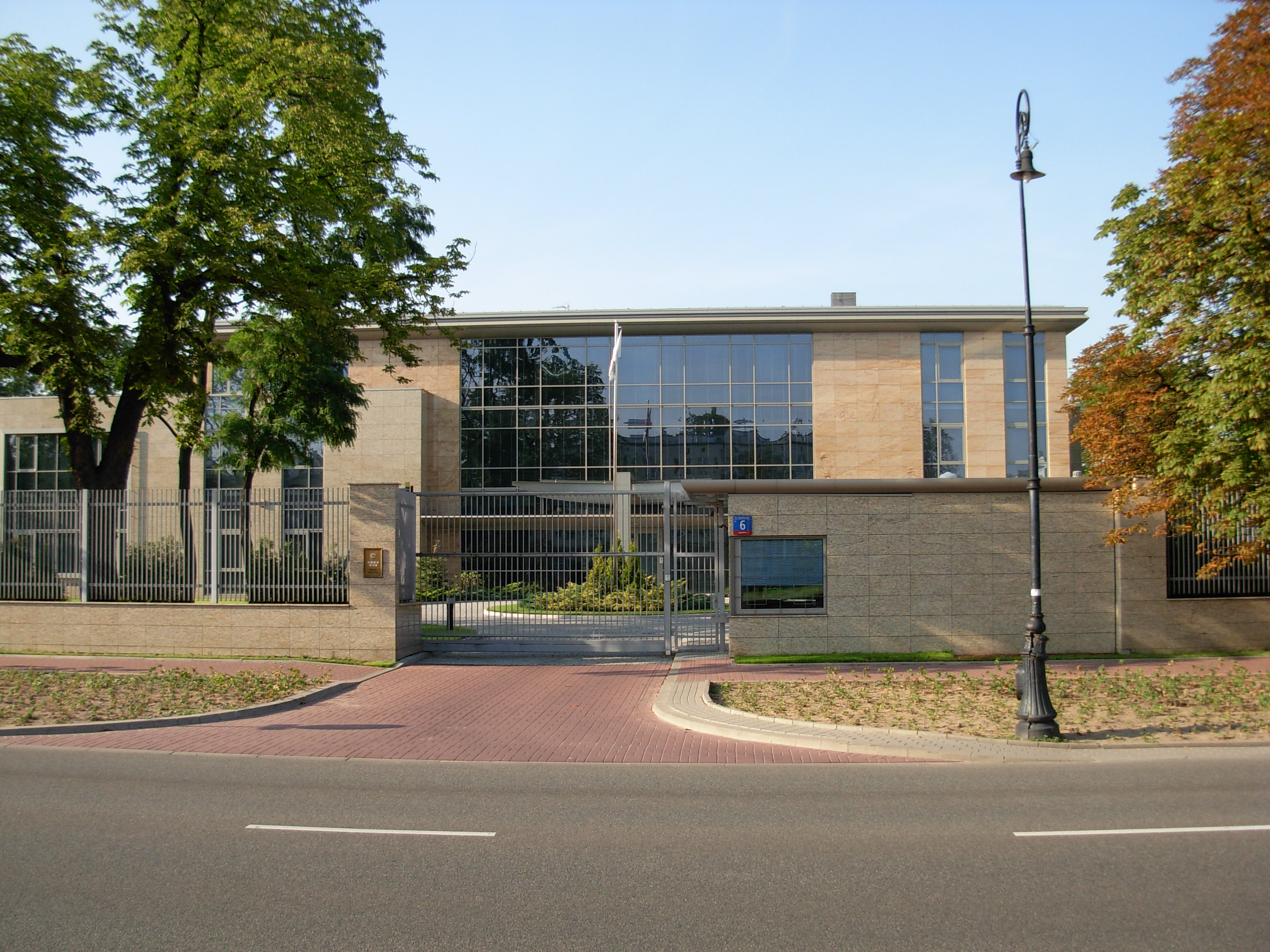
Embassy of South Korea in Warsaw

== See also ==
- Foreign relations of Poland
- Foreign relations of South Korea
- Koreans in Poland
- North Korea–Poland relations
