= The Telebugs =

British animated television series (1986–1987)

- Genre: Animation; Adventure; Si-fi
- Created by: John M. Mills; Elphin Lloyd-Jones
- Voices of: Ron Moody; Suzy Westerby
- Music by: Andy Murray
- Country of origin: United Kingdom
- Original language: English
- No. of series: 3
- No. of episodes: 86

Production
- Executive producer: Anna Home
- Running time: 5 minutes
- Production companies: Telemagination; Telebug Enterprises

Original release
- Network: ITV
- Release: 6 January 1986 – 15 December 1987

The Telebugs is a British animated children's television series featuring three robots.

== Overview ==
The Telebugs are robots C.H.I.P. (Coordinated Hexadecimal Information Processor), S.A.M.A.N.T.H.A. (Solar Activated Micro Automated Non-inTerference Hearing Apparatus) and B.U.G. (Binary Unmanned Gamma-camera) – who were accompanied by a flying video pack called M.I.C. (Mobile Independent Camera). They were invented by Professor Brainstrain (who is also known as Pwofessor Bwainstwain, owing to his unfortunate speech impediment) to stop enemies such as Baron Bullybyte, his Sister Magna, Angel Brain, Z.U.D.O (Zero-failure Universal Data Optimizer) Bug, Arcadia, the Professor's brother Dr. Albert and his Binods Rosie and Pyro, Dr. De Crypt, the Osibis scepter, Count Frankenheim and Igor whilst working as reporters for a TV executive named Mr McStarch.

A total of 3 seasons and 86 episodes were produced by Telebug Enterprises, subsequently renamed Telemagination. This was a subsidiary company of ITV regional franchise holder Television South. It was broadcast on Children's ITV in the United Kingdom from 1986 to 1987.

It was the very first television series made and produced by Telemagination (the company later went onto make several other animated series for children such as The Animals of Farthing Wood, Noah's Island and The Cramp Twins).

It also aired on TV2 in New Zealand from 24 July 1987 to 7 March 1990, on ABC TV in Australia from 6 July 1988 to 13 December 1991, on ABS-CBN in the Philippines, on RTB in Brunei, on TRT 1 in Turkey, on RTM TV1 in Malaysia, on Italia 1 in Italy, on Saudi 2 in Saudi Arabia and on M-Net in South Africa.

The series was also noted for its closing theme song. An extended version of the opening theme had been used at the end of season 1. However, in season 2 the short song "I Have a Heart", written by American singer, pianist and songwriter Mort Shuman (who has lived in both the UK and France), sung by Suzy Westerby (as Samantha), and played out over a closing credit sequence featuring a still of Chip, Samantha and Bug, with Mic's face briefly appearing at the closeout, was used as the closing theme. This version was the best-known theme. An extended version of "I Have A Heart", sung by American disco singer George McCrae and played out over a sequence showing Chip, Samantha and Bug orbiting the Earth and performing pirouettes, was used for the end of the original transmissions of the third, and final, season. However, as this version was almost three minutes long, it was considered too lengthy for such a short cartoon, and was replaced with the same extended version of the opening theme used at the end of season 1 for all future repeats of season 3.

The series also aired on GBC TV in Gibraltar, where it regularly served as a filler during children's programming in the 6:30 – 7:30pm slot during the mid to late 1980s.

The series was also broadcast on cable and satellite television on The Children's Channel.

In 1996 the show was renamed to Gigglebytes with scripts rewritten along with new voices and music. It was distributed by HIT Entertainment. The series with the name change was also broadcast in Singapore on Premiere 12 as part of their lineup of children's programming Kidz Blitz. It was also shown on The Pepe and Paco Show created by HIT.

At least one full-size working model of Samantha was made to publicise the show, making appearances in Children's ITV advertising and continuity, and on the Saturday morning show No. 73 in 1986 and 1987. The model could move its arms and head, and roll along the floor. Its TV head contained a cathode-ray tube monitor capable of displaying facial expressions and other graphics.

Both photographic and film footage of the prop is very rare and hard to come by, with the exception of three YouTube clips that both feature footage of its CITV appearance with host Matthew Kelly, and some episodes from series 7 of No.73. While the same prop was featured in both shows, the No. 73 appearances featured a different voice actress with electronic distortion, and would in the final episodes, wear an apron around its torso. The recent upload of the episodes and the inclusion of the prop, has sparked some intrigue from a small number of fans of both the show and Telebugs itself, with inquiries as to the state and whereabouts of the prop; especially by collectors of memorabilia.

== Voice cast ==
All the male characters were voiced by Ron Moody (except for Bug) and the female characters (also including Bug) were voiced by London-based actress Suzy Westerby, the 1996 version were later voiced by Andy Turvey and Regine Candler. The addition of the latter two actors seems to have come from a planned reboot of the show that never surfaced as the show ended airing in 1987 after series 3 ended. The model of Samantha was voiced by Kate Copstick for appearances on No. 73.

== Transmission guide ==
=== Series 1 ===
| UK Broadcast Date | Title |
|---|---|
| 06.01.1986 | Angel Brain |
| 07.01.1986 | Apple Hi |
| 08.01.1986 | Fair Play |
| 09.01.1986 | Jupiter Moon |
| 10.01.1986 | Telebugs in Danger |
| 13.01.1986 | Zudo Bug |
| 14.01.1986 | Signal Seizure |
| 15.01.1986 | Submarine Snack |
| 16.01.1986 | Oil Strike |
| 17.01.1986 | Digger Dumped |
| 20.01.1986 | Hijack Hacker |
| 21.01.1986 | Zap Code |
| 22.01.1986 | Bank Byte |
| 23.01.1986 | City Stopper |
| 24.01.1986 | The Telebugs Strike Back |
| 27.01.1986 | Power Pirate |
| 28.01.1986 | Robocars |
| 29.01.1986 | Magnetic Madness |
| 30.01.1986 | Flood |
| 31.01.1986 | Flight Plan |
| 03.02.1986 | Return of Zudo |
| 04.02.1986 | TV Terror |
| 05.02.1986 | Complex Confusion |
| 06.02.1986 | Enter the Professor |
| 07.02.1986 | Lethal Lift Off |
| 10.02.1986 | Professor in Danger |

=== Series 2 ===
| UK Broadcast Date | Title |
|---|---|
| 10.11.1986 | Star Venture |
| 11.11.1986 | Parsec Pirates |
| 12.11.1986 | Deep Space Decoy |
| 13.11.1986 | Stardon De–Programme |
| 14.11.1986 | Angel Overload |
| 17.11.1986 | The Binods |
| 18.11.1986 | Scrambling Ray |
| 19.11.1986 | Cave Knaves |
| 20.11.1986 | Scrambled Samantha |
| 21.11.1986 | Binod Rebound |
| 24.11.1986 | Space Age Snooker |
| 25.11.1986 | Culture Crazy |
| 26.11.1986 | Arcadia Goes West |
| 27.11.1986 | Panel Panic |
| 28.11.1986 | Lifo Makes Friends |
| 01.12.1986 | Cosmic Castaway |
| 02.12.1986 | Lebab Goes Ape |
| 03.12.1986 | Lebab Rocks the Moon |
| 04.12.1986 | Rescue |
| 05.12.1986 | Death Station Zudo |
| 08.12.1986 | Shadow of the Past |
| 09.12.1986 | Castle Cyphernal |
| 10.12.1986 | Pit of Peril |
| 11.12.1986 | The Rose of Infinity |
| 12.12.1986 | Lifo to the Rescue |
| 15.12.1986 | The Gate of Swords |
| 16.12.1986 | The Battle of the Air |
| 17.12.1986 | Ordeal by Fire |
| 18.12.1986 | The Lake and the Key |
| 19.12.1986 | The Shrinking Cage |
| 05.01.1987 | Time Shift |
| 06.01.1987 | Roman Doom |
| 07.01.1987 | The Two Caesars |
| 08.01.1987 | Telebugs in Rome |
| 09.01.1987 | All Hail Bug |
| 12.01.1987 | Bait for the Badz |
| 13.01.1987 | Digit Digger |
| 14.01.1987 | Peanut Icicles |
| 15.01.1987 | Brain Lock |
| 16.01.1987 | Flame Out |

=== Series 3 ===
| UK Broadcast Date | Title |
|---|---|
| 17.11.1987 | Pyramids Pyrotechnics |
| 18.11.1987 | Volcano Adventure |
| 19.11.1987 | Magic Megaliths |
| 20.11.1987 | Temple of the Sun |
| 23.11.1987 | Inter-terrain Maze |
| 24.11.1987 | Holographic Holiday |
| 25.11.1987 | Monster Mash |
| 26.11.1987 | Castle Creepers |
| 27.11.1987 | Frankenheim's Monsters |
| 30.11.1987 | Laser Blasers |
| 01.12.1987 | The Palace of Science |
| 02.12.1987 | Colossus |
| 03.12.1987 | Zombie Profs |
| 04.12.1987 | Robot Rampage |
| 07.12.1987 | The Sphere |
| 08.12.1987 | Telesonic Rock |
| 09.12.1987 | Digger Decoy |
| 10.12.1987 | The Tea Party |
| 11.12.1987 | Disarray |
| 15.12.1987 | Mulch to the Rescue |

== Crew and Credits ==
=== Series 1 (1986) ===
- Voices: Ron Moody, Suzy Westerby
- Music: Andy Murray
- Scripts: Diane Freeman, Gwyneth Jones, Bernie Kaye, Shellie Smith, Glenn Tyler
- Animation: Mike Pocock, Tony Guy, Dave Unwin, Alan Green, Ray Kelly, Ramon Modiano, Gary McCarver, Alan Simpson, Janet Nunn, Joanne Gooding, Gary Blatchford, Margot Allen
- Assistants: Claire Bramwell, Nicola Mander, Helen Kincaid
- Storyboard and Layout: Dave Elvin, Peter See
- Backgrounds: Russell Pierman, Kevin Smith
- Trace and Paint: Aubery Hammond, Frankie Convertry, A.M Films, Hierographics, Ann Kotch, Andrew Ryder
- Rostrum: Can Productions, Filmflex Animation Services
- Film Editors: Alan Waller, Jim Hubbard, John Delfgou
- Dubbing Mixer: Mike Billing, Danny Curtis
- Voice Recording: Brian Cresse
- Production Manager: Dennis Gardiner
- Production Co-Ordinator: Shellie Smith
- Production Accountant: Patricia Harvey
- Executive Producer: Anna Home
- Produced and Directed by: John M. Mills and Elphin Lloyd-Jones
- A Telebug Enterprises Production
- Copyright Reserved Telebug Enterprises LTD. 1984
