= Ron Moody =

British actor (1924–2015)

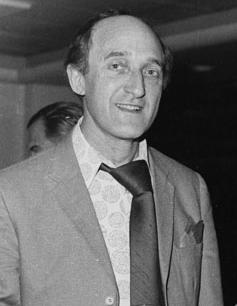
- Moody in 1975
- Born: Ronald Moodnick; 8 January 1924; Tottenham, Middlesex, England
- Died: 11 June 2015 (aged 91); London, England
- Education: London School of Economics
- Occupations: Actor; composer; singer; writer; comedian
- Years active: 1952–2012
- Spouse: Therese Blackbourn (m. 1985)
- Children: 6

Ron Moody (born Ronald Moodnick; 8 January 1924 – 11 June 2015) was an English actor, composer, singer, writer, and comedian. He was most notable for his portrayal of Fagin in Lionel Bart's 1960 stage musical Oliver!, originating the role in the initial London production and reprising it in the 1968 film adaptation and in West End and Broadway revivals in the 1980s. Moody earned a Golden Globe Award and an Academy Award nomination for the film, as well as a Tony Award nomination for the stage production. Other notable projects include The Mouse on the Moon (1963), Mel Brooks's The Twelve Chairs (1970) and Flight of the Doves (1971), in which Moody shared the screen with Oliver! co-star Jack Wild.

== Early life and education ==
Moody was born on 8 January 1924 in Tottenham, Middlesex, the son of Kate (née Ogus; 1898–1980) and Bernard/Barnett Moodnick (1896–1964), a studio executive. His father was a Russian Jew and his mother was a Lithuanian Jew; said Moody, "I'm 100% Jewish—totally kosher!" He was a cousin of director Laurence Moody and actress Clare Lawrence. His surname was legally changed to the more anglicised Moody in 1930.

Moody was educated at Southgate County School, which at the time was a state grammar school, and based in Palmers Green, Middlesex, followed by the London School of Economics in Central London, where he trained to become a sociologist. During World War II, he enlisted in the Royal Air Force (RAF) and became a radar technician.

== Career ==
Despite training to be a sociologist, Moody began appearing in theatrical shows and later decided to become a professional actor.

"My proudest moment was the number "Reviewing the Situation". I suspect that, because I gave my all to the role, and because I was working with such a fine team of people, it inhibited my future career. I turned down quite a few offers afterwards because I thought the people didn't come close to those I'd worked with on Oliver!—which in retrospect was a mistake."

— Moody on his acclaimed role as Fagin and subsequent career.

Moody worked in a variety of genres, but he is perhaps best known for his starring role as Fagin in Lionel Bart's stage and film musical Oliver! based on Oliver Twist by Charles Dickens. He created the role in the original West End production in 1960 and reprised it in the 1984 Broadway revival, receiving a Tony Award nomination for Best Actor in a Musical. For his performance in the 1968 film Oliver!, he received the Golden Globe Award for Best Actor (Musical/Comedy), the Best Actor award at the 6th Moscow International Film Festival and an Academy Award nomination in the same category. Reflecting on the role, Moody states: "Fate destined me to play Fagin. It was the part of a lifetime. That summer of 1967 [during filming] was one of the happiest times of my life". He reprised his role as Fagin in the 1983 Channel 4 television programme The Other Side of London, and again at the 1985 Royal Variety Performance in Theatre Royal, Drury Lane before Queen Elizabeth II and the Duke of Edinburgh.

Moody appeared in several children's television series, including the voice of Badger and Toad in the TV Adaptation of Colin Dann's The Animals of Farthing Wood, Noah's Island, Telebugs, and Into the Labyrinth. Among his better known roles was that of Prime Minister Rupert Mountjoy in the comedy The Mouse on the Moon (1963), alongside Margaret Rutherford, with whom he appeared again the following year in Murder Most Foul (1964), one of Rutherford's Miss Marple films. He played French entertainer and mime artist The Great Orlando in the 1963 Cliff Richard film Summer Holiday. He appeared as Hopkirk in the 1966 episode entitled "Honey For the Prince" of The Avengers. He acted again with former Oliver! Co-star Jack Wild in Flight of the Doves (1971).

In 1969, Moody was offered, but declined, the lead role in Doctor Who, following the departure of Patrick Troughton from the part. He later told many people (including Doctor Who companion Elisabeth Sladen) that declining the role was a decision he subsequently regretted. He played Ippolit Vorobyaninov alongside Frank Langella (as Ostap Bender) in Mel Brooks' version of The Twelve Chairs (1970).In 1995 he appeared in the UK's longest running TV comedy series 'Last of the Summer Wine' as Lieutenant Willoughby. In 2003, he starred in the black comedy Paradise Grove alongside Rula Lenska, and played Edwin Caldecott, an old nemesis of Jim Branning on the BBC soap EastEnders. In 2005, he acted in the Big Finish Productions Doctor Who audio play Other Lives, playing the Duke of Wellington. He made several appearances in BBC TVs long-running variety show, The Good Old Days, enacting pastiche/comic Victorian melodramas.

Moody wrote a novel, The Devil You Don't, which was published by Robson Books, London, in 1980.

In 2004, the British ITV1 nostalgia series After They Were Famous hosted a documentary of the surviving cast of the film Oliver! Several of the film's musical numbers were reenacted. Moody, then 80 but still spry, and Jack Wild (seriously ill with oral cancer at the time) recreated their dance from the closing credits of the film.

Moody was a guest star in an episode of ITV's long-running police drama The Bill in 2004 along with actress Mollie Sugden and appeared in BBC1's Casualty (aired on 30 January 2010) as a Scottish patient who had served with the Black Watch during the Second World War. On 30 June 2010, Moody appeared on stage at the end of a performance of Cameron Mackintosh's revival of Oliver! And made a humorous speech about the show's 50th anniversary. He then reprised the "Pick a Pocket or Two" number with the cast.

Moody was a supporter of Tottenham Hotspur F.C.

== Personal life ==
Moody married a Pilates teacher, Therese Blackbourn, in 1985. The couple had six children: Catherine Laura (b. July 1986), Daniel Maxmilian (b. 17 September 1988), Matthew Alexander (b. September 1990), Micheal Orlando (b. July 1992), Jonathan Barnaby (b. April 1994) and Conrad Augustus (b. July 1996).

== Death ==
Moody died of natural causes while in a London hospital on 11 June 2015, aged 91.

== Partial filmography ==
- Davy (1958) – The Unicyclist (uncredited)
- Follow a Star (1959) – Violinist
- Make Mine Mink (1960) – Jelks (uncredited)
- Five Golden Hours (1961) – Gabrielle
- A Pair of Briefs (1962) – Sidney Pudney
- Summer Holiday (1963) – Orlando
- The Mouse on the Moon (1963) – Prime Minister Rupert Mountjoy
- Ladies Who Do (1963) – Police Inspector
- Murder Most Foul (1964) – H. Driffold Cosgood
- Every Day's a Holiday (1964) – Professor Bastinado
- San Ferry Ann (1965) – German
- The Sandwich Man (1966) – Rowing Coach
- Oliver! (1968) – Fagin
- David Copperfield (1969, TV Movie) – Uriah Heep
- The Twelve Chairs (1970) – Vorobyaninov
- Flight of the Doves (1971) – Hawk Dove
- The Edwardians (1972–1973, TV miniseries) – Robert Baden-Powell
- Legend of the Werewolf (1975) – Zoo Keeper
- Dogpound Shuffle (1975) – Steps
- Closed Up-Tight (1975)
- Starsky & Hutch (1976, TV Series) – Derek Stafford
- The Strange Case of the End of Civilization as We Know It (1977) – Dr Henry Gropinger
- Dominique (1978) – Dr. Rogers
- The Word (1978, TV Mini-Series) – LeBrun
- Unidentified Flying Oddball, aka The Spaceman and King Arthur (1979) – Merlin
- Tales of the Unexpected (1980, TV Episode) – Richard Pratt
- Nobody's Perfect (1980, TV Series) – Inspector Roger Hart
- Into the Labyrinth (1981, TV Series) – Rothgo
- Othello (1981, TV Movie) – Iago
- Dial M for Murder (1981, TV movie) – Capt. Lesgate
- Wrong Is Right (1982) – King Awad
- Where Is Parsifal? (1983) – Beersbohm
- Hart to Hart (1983) – Charles Thompson
- The Other Side of London (1983)
- Murder, She Wrote (1985, TV Episode) - Insp. Henry Kyle
- The Telebugs (1986–1987, TV Series) – (voice)
- Asterix and the Big Fight (1989) – Prolix (British version, voice)
- A Ghost in Monte Carlo (1990, TV Movie) – Alphonse
- How's Business (1991) – Pawnshop broker
- Emily's Ghost (1992) – Dawson
- The Animals of Farthing Wood (1993–1995, TV Mini-Series) – Toad, Badger, Whistler, Rollo, Bully, Spike, Large Town Rat, additional voices (voice)
- A Kid in King Arthur's Court (1995) – Merlin
- Noah's Island (1997–1999) – Noah, Rocco, Reg, Squadron Leader, additional voices (voice)
- The 3 Kings (2000) – King Herod
- Revelation (2001) – Sir Isaac Newton
- Paradise Grove (2003) – Izzie Goldberg
- Lost Dogs (2005) – Maurice Todd
- Moussaka & Chips (2005) – Officer David Tomlinson

== Bibliography ==
- Moody, Ron (1980). "Contributor". David Jacob's Book of Celebrities' Jokes & Anecdotes. By Jacobs, David. Robson Books. p. 109. ISBN 0860511251.

== See also ==
- List of Academy Award winners and nominees from Great Britain
- List of actors with Academy Award nominations
- List of British actors
