= Officer Concentration Station Rothesay =

Officer Concentration Station Rothesay (Polish language: Stacja Zborna Oficerów Rothesay) was a military center of Polish Armed Forces in the West. Created on 14 August 1940 (Order Nr. L.dz. 1977/I.tjn.40), as Officer Camp Nr. 23, it was located in Rothesay, Bute, Scotland.

Officers of the Polish Army, who were sent to the camp, were billeted in several local hotels, such as „Craigmor”, „Craignetham Private Hotel”, „Madras”, „Glenearu”, „Ardyn”, „Struan”, „Bute Arms”, „Esplanade”, „Grand Marine”, „Royal” and „Victoria”. With the permission of Commander-in-chief of Polish Army and British authorities, families of officers were allowed to join them. The relatives of the officers were treated as foreign subjects, and since the Isle of Bute was located in a protected zone, special permission was required to enter the town of Rothesay.

On 28 August 1940 all officers began compulsory English courses, and on 10 September the camp was renamed into Officer Camp Nr. 2 Rothesay.

Due to protests of British Members of Parliament, all officers from Rothesay were in the spring of 1942 sent to different locations, officially for training purposes. Only a handful of sick and senile officers remained there.

Among commandants of the camp were: General Boleslaw Jatelnicki-Jacyna, General Stefan Jacek Dembinski and Colonel Kazimierz Rumsza.

Generals of the Polish Army, who were kept in the camp:

- General Stefan Dąb-Biernacki,
- General Kazimierz Lados,
- General Adam Korytowski,
- General Stanislaw Kwasniewski,
- General Karol Masny,
- General Stanislaw Rouppert,
- General Sergiusz Zahorski,
- General Janusz de Beaurain,
- General Ludomił Rayski.

== Sources ==
- Komenda Stacji Zbornej Oficerów Rothesay. Rozkazy dzienne 1940–1941, Instytut Polski i Muzeum im. gen. Sikorskiego w Londynie

== See also ==
- Polish Army in France (1939–40)
- Polish Armed Forces in the West
- Sikorski's tourists
- Polish government-in-exile
- Cerizay Officer Center
