= Cerizay Officer Center =

The Cerizay Officer Center (Polish: Ośrodek Oficerski w Cerizay) was a detention center for officers of the Polish Army, who managed to reach France after the September 1939 Invasion of Poland. It was formed by Polish Minister of Military Affairs, on November 22, 1939.

Located in the commune of Cerizay, western France, the office housed the surplus of Polish Army officers, who had not been attached to any units during the period of reorganization of the Polish Armed Forces. Furthermore, it served as a detention center for those officers, who were blamed for the September 1939 disaster (most of them were political opponents of General Władysław Sikorski). Commonly known as Wisniowiec (this name referred to the infamous prison at Nowy Wiśnicz), the center existed until the German invasion of France.

First transport of 50 Polish generals and officers was sent to Cerizay on November 24, 1939. The maximum number of people kept at the center was app. 100. All of them had to report daily to the authorities, and the center was known for its widespread invigilation, observation and clandestine searches of private belongings. All letters were censored, and the people who were sent to Cerizay were never explained the reasons for their treatment.

After the defeat of France, the center was moved to Great Britain. In new location, the Isle of Bute, it was renamed into Officer Concentration Station Rothsay.

Among the officers of the Polish Army, who stayed at Cerizay, were: General Stefan Dąb-Biernacki, General Stanislaw Kwasniewski, General Stanislaw Rouppert, General Mikolaj Osikowski, Colonel Tadeusz Alf-Tarczynski, Colonel Henryk Abczynski, Colonel Mieczyslaw Wyzel-Sciezynski, Major Kazimierz Kaciukiewicz, major Ludwik Maria Łubieński.

== Sources ==
- Witold Biegański: Zaczęło się w Coëtquidan. Z dziejów polskich jednostek regularnych we Francji. Warszawa: Wydawnictwo MON, wyd. I, 1977

== See also ==
- Polish Army in France (1939–40)
- Polish Armed Forces in the West
- Sikorski's tourists
- Polish government-in-exile
