= Elphin Lloyd-Jones =

British animator and illustrator

Elphin Lloyd-Jones is a British designer, illustrator, animator, painter and sculptor.

== Life and career ==
Lloyd-Jones began his career at BBC Wales. After a short stint in Germany, he returned to the UK and began working for Thames Television. He established a studio in London with John Mills, eventually developing a pilot for The Telebugs.

In 1993, they directed The Animals of Farthing Wood, based on the book series by Colin Dann, earning a BAFTA nomination. In 1997, he created Noah's Island, which ran until 1999.
