= Noah's Island =

- Noah's Island
- Created by: Elphin Lloyd-Jones
- Developed by: John M. Mills
- Written by: Steve Walker
- Directed by: Philippe LeClerc; Frederic Trouillot; Emile Bourget; Alan Simpson
- Creative director: Elphin Lloyd-Jones
- Voices of: Jon Glover; Sally Grace; David Holt; Ron Moody; Jill Schilling; Melissa Sinden
- Composer: Detlev Kühne
- Country of origin: United Kingdom
- Original language: English
- No. of seasons: 3
- No. of episodes: 39

Production
- Executive producers: Theresa Plummer-Andrews (for BBC); Siegmund Grewenig (for WDR)
- Producers: John M. Mills (series producer); Wolfgang Wegmann (for WDR); Jean-Paul Gaspari (for Praxinos)
- Editors: John Daniels; Ken Morgan
- Running time: 28 minutes
- Production companies: Telemagination; Praxinos

Original release
- Network: BBC1/BBC One (Children's BBC)
- Release: 29 September 1997 – 21 December 1999

Noah's Island is a British animated television series for children made by the creators of The Animals of Farthing Wood and commissioned by the European Broadcasting Union between 1997 and 1999. It was directed by Emile Bourget, Philippe LeClerc, Alan Simpson, and Frederic Trouillot, with the episodes written by Steve Walker. Each of the 39 episodes ran for 28 minutes. Although not as successful as Farthing Wood, it was fairly popular on Saturday mornings in many British households, particularly with its younger demographic. Inspired by the Bible story Noah's Ark, the series was praised for its characterization, imaginative storylines and for introducing ecological themes.

== Plot ==
The series focused on the adventures of a community of animals on a floating island that was originally part of the Canadian Coastline before being struck by a flaming meteorite. Their leader is a polar bear named Noah, and the community includes a pair of woolly mammoths called Salomi and Mammothsbody, as well as a group of animals from a closed down zoo who survived the sinking of a cargo ship. The Island is able to float because of a core of molten magma called the 'Fire-Bowl', which was formed from the meteorite. Noah uses the Fire-Bowl to steer the Island across the ocean, following a map that Salomi's father drew that leads to Diamantina, an uncharted island in the Indian Ocean where the animals can be safe from humans. During their quest, Noah and the community pass by several continents, rescuing animals in peril wherever they go.

== Characters ==
- Noah – the series' main protagonist. Noah is a male polar bear who discovers the floating island whilst adrift on an ice floe in the North Atlantic Ocean, and is eventually elected as the island's captain because of his strong leadership skills. He is eccentric yet ambitious, and his main goal in life is to turn the floating island into a safe haven for all animals.
- Mammothsbody and Salomi – two elderly woolly mammoths who were frozen in Arctic ice during the ice age, but are thawed out by the heat of the meteorite forming the Fire-Bowl. Mammothsbody is slow and simple-minded, while Salomi is more strong-willed, shrewd and aggressive. A recurring joke in the first series is Mammothsbody constantly proposing marriage to Salomi, but she always rejects him. The mammoths eventually marry at the end of the first series, but Salomi continues to talk down to Mammothsbody despite their marriage.
- Sparky – a male white rabbit who never speaks, communicating instead through hand gestures and facial expressions. His small size and lack of strength are often played for comedic effect, and a recurring joke throughout the series is a larger animal falling down and accidentally "crushing" him.
- The Vulture Patrol – a flock of vultures who serve as airborne scouts, often sent to investigate an island or coastline Noah's island approaches. The original group consisted of an elderly, senile vulture named The Squadron Leader, and his two daughters Shirley and Mildred. They are later joined by "Him", a male vulture who is handsome and strong, yet dim-witted. "Him" and Shirley eventually become mates and have a chick together, who is referred to as "Baby Chick Bird".

=== Zoo animals ===
- Rocco – a brash but virtuous male western gorilla who serves as the island's "Chief Surgeon", having acquired basic medical knowledge from observing the zoo's vets. Rocco's main character arc in the series is grieving for his mate Hetty, who died when the cargo ship sank, but eventually starting a relationship with another gorilla named Gertie.
- Woomera – a female red kangaroo who works with Rocco in the island's infirmary. While often caring and kind-hearted, she is prone to stubbornness in difficult situations, and regularly argues with the more reckless Rocco.
- Nab – an anxious but well-meaning male Bornean orangutan who speaks in a stereotypical Scottish accent and watches over the island's Fire-Bowl (the core of molten magma that causes the island to float), referring to himself as the "Chief Engineer".
- Jasper – a male proboscis monkey who assists Nab in the Fire-Bowl chamber. Like Sparky, Jasper never speaks, communicating instead through monkey sounds that are translated by whoever he is speaking to. Despite being a proboscis monkey, Jasper is always referred to as a "gibbon" by other characters.
- The Valve Rhino – a simple-minded male black rhinoceros who works with Nab and Jasper in the Fire-Bowl chamber, using his great strength to push the Fire-Bowl's valve systems. Despite usually being calm and non-confrontational, the rhino is prone to outbursts of violent anger when others voice their annoyance with his habit to say 'Pom-pom-pom-piddle-pom-pom'.
- Reg – an arrogant male mandrill who longs to be human, often trying to do "human" things such as walking on two legs and reading books, though he is illiterate and can only look at the pictures. He is good friends with Rocco, but never shows much consideration towards anyone else, and regards himself as superior to the other animals for being "almost human". Early in the first series, Reg is portrayed as a rogue, but as the series progresses he becomes more of a comic relief character.
- Ursula – a female Eurasian brown bear who speaks in a stereotypical Welsh accent. She is a self-centred gossip, and shows little to no regard towards others. However, despite being a different species of bear she has romantic feelings for Noah.
- Chang – a soft-spoken and timid female giant panda. She is close friends with Ursula and is usually by her side, but they frequently argue about trivial things and rarely agree on anything. Chang also knows how to perform hypnosis to sedate Rocco's patients, but she lacks true skill and often fails to hypnotise someone properly.
- The Problem Walrus – a laid-back male walrus who spends much of his time lounging on the island's beach, but also offers a counselling service, listening to the personal problems of other characters and offering philosophical guidance and advice.
- Tabby and Ena – a pair of female striped hyenas who act as Reg's bodyguards. During the first series, both give birth to one mischievous pup each, which are the first babies to be born on the floating island. However, the father of the pups drowned when the cargo ship sank, and never appears in the series.
- Carmen – an awkward female aardvark who is very sensitive about her long nose and tongue. She can be very aggressive, but she is usually mannered and well-tempered.
- Agatha – a female reticulated giraffe who is something of a snob, looking down on the other animals in more ways than one. Though she is snooty, she always assist with whatever events require skills unique to a giraffe, so overall she's ill-tempered, but still cares.

=== Rescued animals ===
- Sacha – a friendly male Russian desman, who always tries to help however he can in difficult situations, with his usual catchphrase of "oiski poiski", despite the other animals seeing him as an annoyance. Before the Vulture Patrol took him to the island, Sacha performed in a circus in Spain, and he dreams of starting his own circus with insects as the stars, going so far as to train a beetle, whom he names "Jeremy", to do tricks.
- Gertie – a female gorilla who was born and raised in captivity. She is rescued by Noah and the Problem Walrus from a cargo plane that crashed on a reef off-shore from the island. At first, Gertie and Rocco don't get on with each other, but they eventually form a relationship and have a daughter together named Tina after Diamantina.
- Wommie – a male wombat who joins the island's community after helping Woomera find a bandicoot in the Australian Outback. He is brave, adventurous, and has little sense of danger, often attempting life-threatening stunts in his efforts to have fun.
- Tusker – a male African elephant calf who is brought to the island by the Vulture Patrol after being separated from his herd in a desert. Tusker's herd, including his 100-year-old Grandfather, arrive on the island shortly afterwards, and are shown to have joined the community. However, after the episode "Search for the Baby Elephant", the herd never appears on screen again, and no explanation is given as to where they are. Tusker continues to appear in later episodes despite this.
- Grandfather Elephant – a 100-year-old male African elephant who gives much wisdom and has much knowledge of ancient Africa. He's the leader of herd of African elephants, but he doesn't show very much on the series. His age catches up with him eventually and he goes out to sea to die. He asks Salomi and Mammothsbody to watch him, along with the baby elephant's mother.
- The Lion – a male African lion with no name who was saved after he was shot by poachers.
- Wowee – a pampered female French poodle who was travelling with her owners on a boat that washed up on the shores of the island during a storm. Her owners are never found, and she soon joins Reg's gang, becoming one of his fondest admirers and seeing him as the closest thing to a human on the island. She struggles to fit in among the other wild animals because of her domestic upbringing.
- Calanor – a male aye-aye with the ability to hypnotise other animals. At first, he arrives on the island intending to hypnotise and enslave the community and become their ruler. He eventually abandons this plan, but remains on the island. Despite having lived in the forests of Madagascar before arriving on the island, Calanor speaks in a stereotypical French accent.
- Imshee – a male warthog who is an old childhood friend of Rocco's. He takes up residence on Noah's island after Rocco, Noah and Ursula rescue him from an abandoned zoo in East Africa; the same zoo in which Rocco spent his early life.
- The Do-Dah – a male dodo chick who hatched from an ancient egg that was discovered in a cave by Sacha and Carmen. His accent and speech patterns are similar to a stereotypical pirate, using slang such as "Me Hearties". For a time he insists that dodos are not extinct, until he visits Mauritius and an old parakeet explains how humans brought about their extinction.
- Natasha – a female golden mole who Noah and Sacha find in the Arabian Desert. When they first meet, Natasha is infatuated with Sacha, going so far as to propose marriage to him. However, she soon rejects him upon meeting a male of her species (who is never named). Noah brings the moles onto the island to assist in navigation, having heard legends that golden moles are expert navigators, but to his disappointment the moles turn out to be inept at navigation due to their poor eyesight.
- Rita – a hyperactive female baboon who is brought to Diamantina from Africa to be Reg's mate. When Rita first meets Reg, she verbally abuses him and sees him as inferior, but she eventually warms to him and becomes his mate. It is never stated what kind of baboon Rita is, but she appears to be a different species from Reg the mandrill.
- Chip – a head-strong male wallaby who Gertie and Wommie meet in Australia. He is brought to Diamantina to be Woomera's mate, and even though he is a different species and significantly smaller than Woomera, they still become close friends.
- Tallulah – a female rhinoceros who is brought to Diamantina to be a mate for the Valve Rhino. She is much more intelligent, well-spoken and articulate than the Valve Rhino, but they fall in love and become mates despite their differing personalities.
- The Komodo dragon – a frightening-looking but very kind male Komodo dragon.

Other animals which join the community on the island's way to Diamantina include a pangolin, a bandicoot, two three-toed sloths, a mongoose, two Spix's macaws, an entire herd of African elephants, rock hyraxes, and several giant tortoises.

While on their travels they also meet many animals that don't board the island such as an Indian water-buffalo, a dromedary camel, sea-turtles, some species of butterflies, wildebeests, a sea lion, a wild cat, dugongs, a great white shark, Indian cobras, budgerigars, and a community of kākāpō.

=== Residents of Diamantina ===
- Queen Abront – the primary villain of the third series. She is a giant, prehistoric frog who rules over Diamantina as a "Queen" and a "Mother". She is a traditionalist with a prejudice towards any modern species, who she refers to as "Un-Froggables" and sees them as lacking respect for ancient ways; especially humans who she sees as all intelligence and no soul. However, she warms up to Reg and Rita who she comes to see as her children. On the final episode, she makes peace with Noah and trusts him to look after her frogspawn after Diamantina's destruction.
- Galeo – another giant frog and servant of Queen Abront.
- Morris – another servant of Queen Abront. Despite being loyal to Abront, he is friendly and kind-hearted, and does not see the "Un-Froggables" as a serious threat. He is also the smallest of the frogs, being closer in size to Sacha.
- Gorm – Salomi's father, he is an ancient mammoth who painted the map to Diamantia that Noah and the animals follow, and has lived on Diamantina peacefully since the ice age. Like Abront, he is defensive over Diamantina and sees Noah and the other animals as invaders who threaten to disrupt his tranquil life style. He and Mammothsbody have a bit a rivalry over leader of the herd despite them along with Salomi are the only three mammoths in the island. Eventually, he makes peace with Noah and joins the island when it leaves the ruins of Diamantina.

== List of episodes ==
=== Season 1 ===
#	Title	Summary	Original Air Date
1	"The Lost Zoo"	A meteorite falls from the sky and causes a chunk of the Canadian Coastline to break off from the mainland and form a floating island. A polar bear named Noah discovers the island while adrift on an ice floe, and makes it his home. Upon arriving, he meets and befriends Mammothsbody and Salomi, two woolly mammoths that were frozen in Arctic ice for millennia until they were re-awakened by the meteorite, which has formed a pool of molten magma at the island's core. Elsewhere, the animals of a closed down zoo are being taken to a new zoo on a cargo ship, but a fierce storm makes the ship sink. Some of the zoo animals (including a gorilla named Rocco, a kangaroo named Woomera, an orangutan named Nab, a giraffe named Agatha, and many others) survive by breaking out of their cages, and become shipwrecked on Noah's Island.	29 September 1997
2	"Reg Draws a Map"	Noah tries to convince the zoo animals that have become shipwrecked on his island to live together as a community. However, Reg the Mandrill protests against Noah's ideas, believing that living as a community wouldn't work, and proposes the idea of each animal owning his or her own piece of land or "country" on the island.	30 September 1997
3	"Sacha Finds a Home"	The island passes by the western coast of Spain, and the Vulture Patrol rescue a Russian desman named Sacha from a circus, but the Squadron Leader, dazed and confused after being shot by a human, drops Sacha in the ocean on the way back. Sacha washes up on the island's beach, where he is discovered by Ursula the Brown Bear and Chang the Giant Panda, and is soon accepted into the island's community.	1 October 1997
4	"Sacha's Busy Day"	The island runs aground off the coast of Africa and Noah becomes desperate to steer back into open water. An injured lion finds his way on to the island after being shot in the leg by poachers, but when the poachers follow the lion onto the island, Noah and the other animals try to come up with a plan to chase them off without being seen. Meanwhile, Sacha is rushed off his feet doing odd jobs for the other animals.	2 October 1997
5	"Elephant Trouble"	As the island continues to travel along the west African coast, The Vulture Patrol informs Noah of a herd of elephants who are struggling to find water in a desert. When they return to the desert, the vultures only manage to find one elephant, a calf named Tusker, and they carry him off to the island. Noah puts Sacha in charge of looking after the new arrival, but Tusker quickly becomes distraught at the absence of his herd, and things get worse when the hyenas kidnap Tusker and take him to Reg's cave. The elephant herd find their way to the island in search of their lost calf.	3 October 1997
6	"Search for the Baby Elephant"	Tusker goes missing again, and his mother is so distraught that she refuses to eat or drink until he is found. The hyenas have brought Tusker back to Reg, who wants him to paint the interior of his cave. Meanwhile, Tusker's Grandfather, having recovered from passing out in the desert, swims to the island in search of his grandson.	6 October 1997
7	"Doggies"	There is much excitement among the island's community when one of Reg's "Doggies" (the two hyenas that serve as his guard dogs and henchmen) has a litter of pups. Later on, Noah tries to steer the island as far away from a cluster of human-inhabited islands as possible, despite Reg's protests. A boat washes up on the island's beach and the animals worry that humans have discovered them, but upon exploring the wreck, the only living thing they find is a pampered and snobby French poodle named Wowee.	7 October 1997
8	"The Shipwrecked Desman"	Wowee the poodle is struggling to fit in with the island's community because of her strong vanity and pampered upbringing, but she finds solace in the company of Reg, whom she sees as the closest thing to a human being on the Island. After managing to get the boat's engine working again, Wowee and Reg try to sail away from the island and back to civilisation, but the engine fails, the boat begins to sink and some hungry sharks close in.	8 October 1997
9	"Born to Be Wild"	The island floats along the north-east coast of South America, and Noah comes up with an idea to bring a breeding pair of an endangered animal from the Amazon rainforest to his island. The Vulture Patrol brings a female Spix's macaw to the island, with the hyena pups later finding a male in the island's forest, and Noah hopes that they will mate and breed. Unfortunately, the macaws are both extremely aggressive, constanyly fighting with each other and attacking the other animals. Meanwhile, a sloth swims onto the island and causes mischief in the forest.	9 October 1997
10	"How to Be a Bear"	After accidentally flying too close to the Fire-Bowl, the Squadron leader is blinded, leaving him unable to fulfil his duties and forcing him to resign from the Vulture Patrol. Things go from bad to worse for the vultures when Him (the biggest and strongest vulture in the flock) leaves the Patrol as well, wishing to be a bear so he can attend the "Bear Evening" (a social gathering for the island's bears).	10 October 1997
11	"Woomera Runs Away"	A pod of dolphins beach themselves on the island's beach. Woomera the Kangaroo, who becomes personally attached to the situation, tries to entice them back into the sea, but the next day the dolphins beach themselves again. As this is going on, a contagious virus goes around the island's population, and several animals are quarantined in the infirmary, so Woomera is left to aid the dolphins herself. Despite her best efforts the dolphins die, and Woomera becomes severely depressed and decides to leave the island.	13 October 1997
12	"The Skating Rhinoceros"	In an attempt to reach Diamantina quicker, Noah decides to take a short cut around Cape Horn, an area of sea renowned for its vicious storms. As they pass through though, an enormous tidal wave crashes through the island, extinguishing the Fire-Bowl and leaving Mammothsbody badly injured. With the island at the mercy of the ocean currents, the animals are furious with Noah, and he leaves the role of the island's captain out of shame for his actions. But after the opportunistic Reg elects himself as the new captain, Noah sets out to redeem himself.	14 October 1997
13	"A Dodo Do-da Day "	Temperatures drop severely as the island floats along the coast of Antarctica. With snow and ice everywhere, Reg attempts to make a fire in his cave to keep the other animals warm. Meanwhile, Sacha and Carmen the Aardvark discover a strange egg in the snow, and the warmth of Reg's fire makes the egg to hatch, revealing that the chick inside is a dodo. Elsewhere, a smouldering meteorite crashes into the island, and Noah tries to use it to restart the Fire-Bowl.	15 October 1997

=== Season 2 ===
#	Title	Summary	Original Air Date
14	"The Promised Land"	Coming away from the Antarctic Coast, the Island is getting closer to Diamantina, but Salomi is worried that she will die when they reach the paradise, which frightens Mammothsbody. Meanwhile, a cargo plane crashes on a nearby reef, and Noah and The Problem Walrus swim out to investigate. They rescue Gertie, a female gorilla who was born and raised in a zoo, and bring her back to the island, but Gertie's loud and bossy personality soon begins to annoy the other animals.	28 September 1998
15	"The Once Plentiful Bandicoot"	The Island passes by Australia. Woomera ventures onto the mainland and explores the Australian outback in search of a bandicoot, refusing to believe Gertie's claim that bandicoots are extinct. During her search, Woomera meets a wombat named Wommie, who tells her that all the bandicoots have been eaten by the mythical Bunyip, but she is undeterred by this claim. Eventually, Woomera succeeds in finding a bandicoot, and takes him and Wommie back to the island.	29 September 1998
16	"Something to Squawk About"	An approaching tidal wave threatens the Island, so Noah sends the Vulture Patrol to search for another island that they can hide behind until the wave passes. The vultures succeed in finding a suitable island, only to discover that it is populated by hundreds of green parrots that refuse to heed their warning of the impending tidal wave.	30 September 1998
17	"Visit to the End of the Whirlpool"	While teaching Mammothsbody how to swim, Sacha is sucked into a whirlpool, which drops him off in an underwater cave beneath the Island, where he discovers a giant clam with an enormous pearl inside. Meanwhile, Rocco the Gorilla's ego is boosted upon discovering he has a silver hair on his back.	1 October 1998
18	"The Butterfly House"	Wommie makes a didgeridoo, and the noise it produces attracts dozens of butterflies. Fascinated by the instrument's ability, Reg takes up a new hobby of butterfly collecting. He swims over to an uninhabited island in the hopes of adding new specimens to his collection, only to discover that this island is populated by dozens of carnivorous plants, with the voracious appetites of these plants putting him in danger.	2 October 1998
19	"Much Ado About Vultures"	While rescuing Reg from a shark, the Squadron Leader is fatally wounded. Convinced that he's close to death, he holds a contest to see which of the other vultures will take over from him as leader of the Vulture Patrol.	5 October 1998
20	"Sacha the Termite Queen"	A heat wave passes over the Island and the animals all try to keep cool. Noah and Wommie rescue a pangolin who is adrift on a log and bring him back to the Island, where he immediately befriends Carmen the Aardvark. After Carmen and the pangolin eat the queen of a termite colony, Sacha offers himself as a replacement queen, but the termites capture him and imprison him in their nest. Upon hearing what has happened, Noah sets out to try and rescue Sacha. Meanwhile, the strong heat causes Woomera to faint, and Rocco fears that she may die of heat stroke.	6 October 1998
21	"A Mongoose in a Monsoon"	The Island is overrun with an infestation of venomous snakes that waste no time in biting any animal they come across. With the casualties mounting, Noah sends the Vulture Patrol to find a mongoose from the mainland to help them. The vultures eventually succeed, and the mongoose, Goosey, comes to the island and treats the bitten animals with his herbal medicines, but admits that he gave up fighting snakes a long time ago. However, Goosey soon agrees to try ridding the Island of the snakes.	7 October 1998
22	"The Golden Mole"	The Island floats through oil-polluted waters, and as the beach becomes covered in oil, Noah is stuck with what to do. Goosey and Salomi suggest that they find a golden mole, a rare animal that is rumoured to have magical powers and never fail in navigation, and Noah, Sparky and Sacha travel ashore to the Arabian desert to find a golden mole.	8 October 1998
23	"Bad Gnus on Noah's Island"	The Vulture Patrol returns from a scouting mission on the east African coast and tell Noah that they saw some animals trapped in a long-abandoned zoo. Rocco and Ursula are sent out to help the animals, and Rocco recognises the zoo as the one he was born and raised in. During the rescue mission, Rocco is reunited with Imshee, a warthog he knew when he was a child. Meanwhile, a stampeding herd of gnus find their way onto the Island and wreak havoc.	9 October 1998
24	"Aye-aye Captinski"	The Island travels past Madagascar, and Ursula decides to do a good deed to redeem herself for past mistakes. Noticing that a portion of forest has been cleared by humans, Ursula steals a coconut that Noah planned to give to Rocco and Gertie as a wedding present and travels to the mainland with Chang and Mammothsbody to plant it. Upon arriving though, the animals meet Calanor, a devious aye-aye who hypnotises them into doing his bidding. Calanor commands the hypnotised Mammothsbody to take him to the Floating Island, where he plans to overthrow Noah as its leader, and things get worse for Noah when an enormous swarm of locusts descend on the Island and set about eating all the plants.	12 October 1998
25	"Rocco Fights a Dragon"	As the Island passes by Mauritius, Do-Dah is feeling depressed and frustrated about never meeting any other dodos in his life, and is in denial about his species' extinction. The Problem Walrus suggests that Do-Dah should visit Mauritius to find out more about his kind, and Sacha and Wommie accompany Do-Dah on his trip. Meanwhile, a sea turtle washes up on the beach and asks Noah and the Islander's help in defending her newly hatched babies from a hungry Komodo dragon.	13 October 1998
26	"Taking Tortoises to Diamantina"	The Island approaches the final leg of its journey, and Diamantina is only a few days away. However, a fire breaks out on a nearby island inhabited by giant tortoises. Noah commands one final rescue mission and the animals evacuate all the tortoises from the burning island. Afterwards, the Island finally reaches Diamantina, and the Islanders waste no time in disembarking onto the promised land. Upon arriving, the first animal they meet is Gorm, a woolly mammoth who turns out to be Salomi's long-lost father.	14 October 1998

=== Season 3 ===
#	Title	Summary	Original Air Date
27	"Problems in Paradise"	The Animals settle into their new life in the promised land of Diamantina, but all is not well. Diamantina is plagued with earth tremors, one of which causes a rock slide that leaves Gertie trapped in a cave, and after Gorm confesses that Diamantina floods during the night of a full moon, the other animals begin to blame Noah for leading them to a place where they're always in danger. Elsewhere, Chang discovers a cave full of beautiful jewels, but when Ursula finds out about the cave they argue over ownership of the jewels.	3 December 1998
28	"The Maniac Gibbon"	The Animals stop listening to Noah and turn against him in the aftermath of the flood. Meanwhile, Diamantina's other residents, a race of prehistoric frogs, learn of the inhabitants of the floating Island, and seeing them as invaders, they prepare to fight back.	6 December 1998
29	"An Old Mammoth's New Tricks"	Noah and Gertie decide to set off on the floating island to find mates for the other animals so their community can grow. For their first mission, they travel to Africa to find a mate for Reg, bringing back a boisterous female baboon named Rita. Gorm is outraged by Noah and Gertie's plan, believing that more animals coming to Diamantina will ruin his peace and tranquility. Queen Abront advises Gorm to kill the "Invaders", starting with Reg.	7 December 1998
30	"Sacha the Newshound"	Gertie gives Sacha the job of Diamantina's "Newshound", in which he has to travel around the community and report current and upcoming events, but he ends up spreading gossip and secrets that he overhears. Meanwhile, Noah, Gertie and Wommie go to Australia to find a mate for Woomera, and Reg steals all of Diamantina's bananas to impress Rita, causing upset among the community's primates and further angering Queen Abront and the frogs.	8 December 1998
31	"The Sheriff of Diamantina"	Wommie the Wombat is appointed as Diamantina's law enforcement, but he abuses his newly gained authority by arresting animals for the smallest of offences, such as Mammothsbody sucking his trunk and Carmen eating ants without a "licence". Meanwhile, Chang and Ursula find a strange man-made machine washed up on the beach, and upon discovering it has a camera and human voices coming out of it, Noah orders to have the machine destroyed, believing that it will lead humans to Diamantina.	9 December 1998
32	"The Great Wall"	Salomi senses that Diamantina will flood again, so Noah orders Sacha to spread the word of the next flood. Rocco and Gertie plan to build a rock wall in front of their cave's entrance to protect the animals from the flood, while Noah and Nab struggle to find enough lava stones to fuel the Fire-Bowl. When Noah finds out what Rocco is planning he sets out to stop the wall from being built and convince Rocco that the wall won't protect them.	10 December 1998
33	"Reg Qualifies as a Frog"	Noah and Gertie go back to Africa to find a mate for the Valve Rhino, but because the rhino has charged off into the forest, they ask Gorm to push the valve system in the Fire-Bowl. The rhino wanders into Queen Abront's cave, and Rocco and Woomera venture in to find him, but get lost in the tunnels. Meanwhile, Galleo eats the lice Sacha was collecting for his insect circus, so Sacha believes that a monster is on the loose and sets out to find more lice.	13 December 1998
34	"Nice Enticing Ice"	An enormous iceberg floats by the coast of Diamantina. The animals who are more used to colder climates, such as Noah and the Problem Walrus, are delighted by the sudden cold snap the iceberg brings, but everyone else tries to escape the cold by sleeping in the Fire-Bowl chamber. Upon discovering that there is a deep crevice within the iceberg, Gorm and the frogs devise a plan to trap the animals inside, so when the iceberg leaves it will take them with it.	14 December 1998
35	"Rocco Hates Raffia"	Gertie takes up the hobby of weaving raffia. Rocco is initially annoyed by the large amounts of raffia in his cave, but upon noticing the substance's strength, he comes up with the idea to construct a chair-lift that goes across Diamantina using the raffia as a cable line. Most of the animals are supportive of the idea and help Rocco set up the raffia cable, but Gorm is once again angered that the animals are ruining his paradise. When Reg and Rita tell Queen Abront what is happening, she sends Reg to sabotage the construction of the chair-lift.	15 December 1998
36	"Diamantina Rose"	Boredom sets in to the residents of Diamantina. The frogs and Reg set off to find the very rare Diamantina rose, which only grows once every 100 years. Sacha meets the frog he saved a while back, and is asked to teach the frog some circus tricks.	16 December 1998
37	"The Coral Reef"	The animals take pieces from Diamantina's coral reef to help Gertie decorate her cave, but the removal of coral from the reef has unexpected repercussions. Noah joins Sacha's newshound team to head spread news faster.	17 December 1998
38	"Some Kind of Bear"	Earthquakes are becoming more frequent in Diamantina. Gertie realises that Diamantina is not a safe place to raise her unborn baby, so despite Noah's protests, the Animals prepare to leave Diamantina for good. Ursula is elected as a new captain.	20 December 1998
39	"Adios Diamantina"	The animals still aren't convinced after Noah's attempts to persuade them. The animals board the island without Noah. Meanwhile, Reg and Sacha are requested to help the Queen Frog.	21 December 1998

== Cast ==
- Ron Moody – Noah the Polar Bear / Rocco the Gorilla / Reg the Mandrill / Squadron Leader the Vulture / Additional Voices
- Sally Grace – Woomera the Kangaroo / Additional Voices
- Jon Glover – Mammothsbody the Woolly Mammoth / Imm the Vulture / Additional Voices
- David Holt – Sacha the Desman / Additional Voices
- Jill Shilling – Ursula the Brown Bear / Salomi the Woolly Mammoth / Additional Voices
- Melissa Sinden – Chang the Giant Panda / Agatha the Giraffe / Additional Voices
- Jeremy Barrett – Elderly Dugong / Additional Voices
- Rupert Farley – Circus Sea Lion / Wommie the Wombat / Chip the Wallaby / Bandicoot / Additional Voices

== See also ==
- European Broadcasting Union
- List of BBC children's television programmes
