= Pamela Keevil Kral =

British actress

Pamela Keevil (14 August 1955 – 15 October 2025) was a British actress who did voice work for the animated series The Animals of Farthing Wood from 1992 to 1995. She also played Debbie in the comedy TV film Incident on The Line. She was also the narrator for The Essential Lover's Guide. She's also the singer in the singles by 'Pam and the Paperclips' released by Nigel and Roger Planer titled 'Typing Pool' and 'Dear Katie'. She is sometimes credited as Pamela Keevil or Pamela Keevil-Kral.

Pamela Keevil taught drama at Bishop Wand Church of England Sports College School for a short period of time.
