= Rula Lenska =

British actress (born 1947)

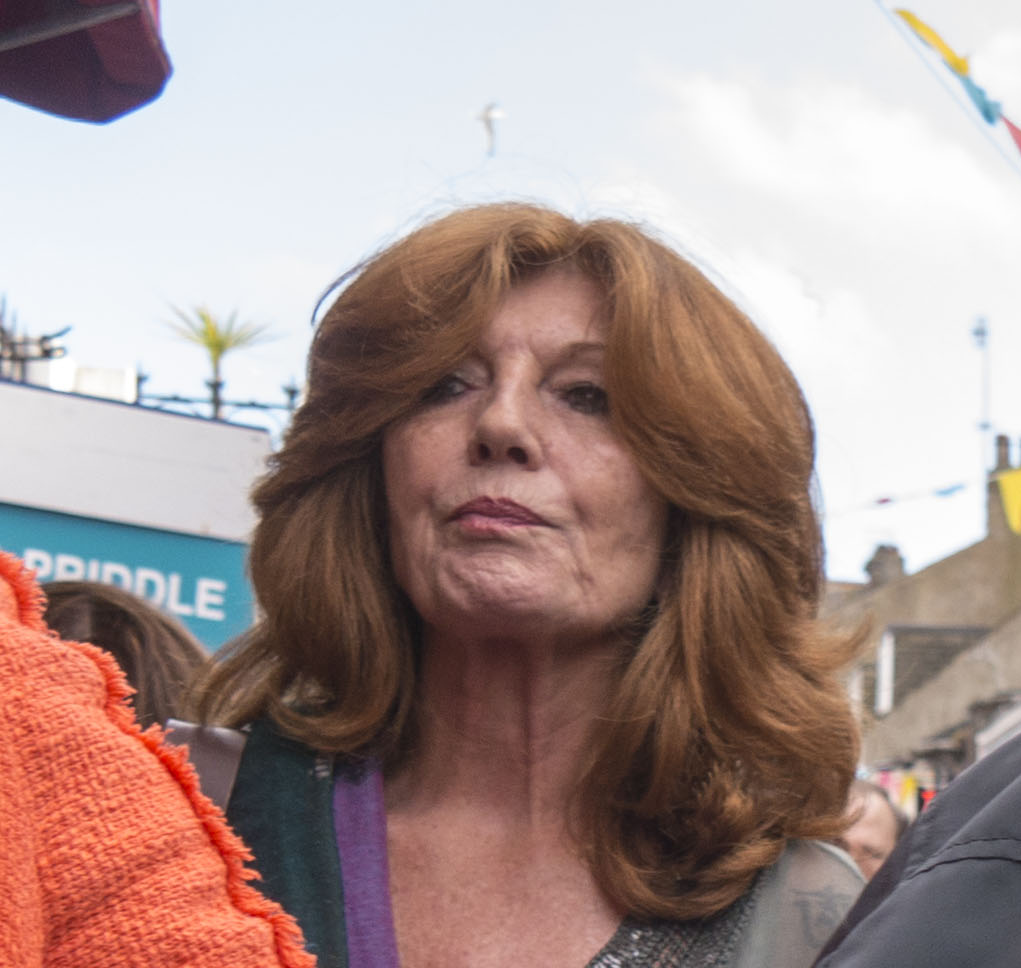
- Lenska in 2015
- Born: Roza Maria Leopoldyna Lubienski; 30 September 1947 (age 79); Diddington, Huntingdonshire, England
- Occupation: Actress
- Years active: 1965–present
- Spouses: Brian Deacon (m. 1977; div. 1987); Dennis Waterman (m. 1987; div. 1998)
- Children: 1

Rula Lenska (born Roza Maria Leopoldyna Lubienski 30 September 1947) is a British actress. She mainly appears in British stage and television productions, but appeared in a series of television advertisements in the 1970s and 1980s in the United States. In the United Kingdom, she played Luce Habit in Queen Kong (1976) and Claudia Colby in the ITV soap opera Coronation Street (2009–11; 2018–22).

Lenska was previously married to the actors Brian Deacon (1977–1987) and Dennis Waterman (1987–1998). Both marriages ended in divorce.

== Early life ==
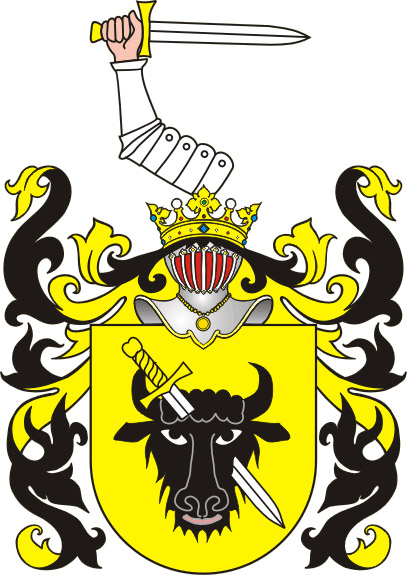
Łubieński coat of arms

Lenska was born in England in the village of Diddington, near St Neots, Huntingdonshire, in a Polish resettlement camp that had previously been the EVAC American Military Hospital. Her birth was registered in nearby St Neots.

Her family is Polish nobility, bearing the Pomian coat of arms, and before World War II owned a castle and estate in Kazimierza Wielka. Her father, Major Ludwik Łubieński, was personal secretary to Józef Beck, Minister for Foreign Affairs in Poland before the German occupation of the country. Later, he became adjutant to General Sikorski, Prime Minister of the Polish Government in Exile and was chief of the Polish military mission in Gibraltar during World War II. During the Cold War he headed the CIA-funded Polish Section of Radio Free Europe in Germany. Her mother was Countess Elżbieta Tyszkiewicz, who escaped from Poland to Italy during the German occupation, but was captured with her own mother and sent to Ravensbrück concentration camp, where they survived for two years before emigrating to England in 1946.

Lenska has two sisters: Anna, an actress who appeared in films in the late-1950s and early-1960s, and Gabriela. Lenska was educated at the Ursuline Convent School in Westgate-on-Sea, Kent.

== Career ==
=== 1965–1980: Early works and U.S. recognition ===
After attending Webber-Douglas School of Drama for two and a half years, Lenska embarked on her career as an actress at 18, much to her father's dismay, who wanted her to go into the United Nations; she first appeared in an uncredited role in Dixon of Dock Green. Lenska's first major production was in the West End production of Francis Durbridge's play, Suddenly at Home, as Ruth. She would then go on to portray Helga in the 1975 British adventure comedy Royal Flash, based on the George MacDonald Fraser novel of the same name, before receiving subsequent notoriety for her role as Little Ladies band member "Q" in the British TV series Rock Follies (1976–77), which she describes as her most lucrative role. By this time, she had "discarded" her title as a Polish countess; she has said of the decision, "In England it doesn't count, if you'll excuse the pun."

In the late 1970s, Lenska began to appear in television adverts for the hair product Alberto VO5, which were shown in the United States. Because Lenska had primarily worked in Britain, she was almost entirely unknown in the United States, yet the commercials were scripted as if Lenska was an established celebrity. The question 'Who the hell is Rula Lenska?' was first asked by U.S. news anchor Don Lark, followed by Johnny Carson on The Tonight Show (which later became a running joke on the series), and then in the U.S. publication The Washington Post, whose writer, Roger Rosenblatt, designated Lenska as "a nobody." Around the same time, Jane Curtin enacted Lenska in a sketch on Saturday Night Live.

On 5 June 1978, Lenska performed as Titania in David Conville's directorial version of the William Shakespeare's play A Midsummer Night's Dream. The production was staged at the Regent's Park Open Air Theatre in London.

The ribbing culminated with a sketch on the short-lived 1980 variety program The Big Show, where Steve Allen, dressed in drag, parodied her as "Rula Shiksa," making a commercial by a swimming pool; Lenska, making her first U.S. appearance, came onto the set to confront him. Allen was not told about her presence; it was a prank arranged by the show's producer, Nick Vanoff, who kept her hidden during the entire rehearsal and filming, so he was legitimately shocked when she approached him. She delivered a punchline, "I'm Rula Lenska and you're not!" and then pushed him into the pool.

=== 1981–1989: Subsequent roles and continued stage presence ===
In 1981, Lenska would ironically portray Countess Radzsky in the television film The Seven Dials Mystery, based on the Agatha Christie mystery novel of the same name. She was also featured in the BBC serial Private Schulz broadcast in the same year. From 5 September to 10 October 1981, Lenska, in her first leading role, starred alongside John Inman in the short-lived sitcom Take a Letter, Mr. Jones, playing the role of executive Joan Warner. The series ran for only six episodes before being cancelled due to poor ratings. In November, she guest starred as Mademoiselle Dutoit in the BBC television sitcom To the Manor Born in the episode, "Cosmetics." In 1982, Lenska returned to stage, performing as Judith Hayne in the West End murder mystery theatre production, Mr. Fothergill's Murder, originally written by Peter O'Donnell. The show premiered in April at Hull New Theatre; Lenska retained the role for seven months until the show's closing in November at Duke of York's Theatre in London.

Lenska also appeared as a storyteller in five episodes of the BBC children's programme Jackanory, narrating traditional Polish folk tales. That same year, Lenska would first guest star in the Dennis Waterman-lead comedy Minder, as Kate; she would make future appearances on the programme between 1985 and 1989, during her marriage to Waterman. In September 1983, Lenska voiced Tanya in the novel-based Murder at the Red October on the BBC Radio 4 station. In 1984, Lenska guest starred as Morgwyn of Ravenscar in the drama series Robin of Sherwood, which was filmed near St Michael's Mount, Cornwall. For six weeks in 1985, Lenska and future husband Dennis Waterman acted opposite each the other in the romantic comedy Same Time, Next Year, originally written by Bernard Slade. Their performances ran from September to December at The Old Vic Theatre in London. In 1987, Lenska returned to voice portrayals on BBC Radio, leading as Lady Faustus in the self-entitled broadcast. From September to November 1988, Lenska starred as Elvira in Noël Coward's Blithe Spirit; Lenska returned to production in June 1989 in replacement of Louise Jameson.

=== 1990–1998: Decline in television and film; primary work in theatre ===
Shortly after Lenska no longer appeared in Alberto VO5 commercials, her demand dropped significantly, appearing in very few films and starring television roles.

From June to July 1990, Lenska played Valerie Vilma in Václav Havel's Temptation at the Westminster Theatre. In 1992, Lenska acted as Desiree Armfeldt in the West End musical A Little Night Music from 16 April to 2 May, at the Plymouth Theatre Royal. In 1993, she performed in two West End productions, the first The Cherry Orchard (from May to June), playing the role of Lyuba Ranyevskaya, a landowner, at the Redgrave Theatre, Farnham, and the second Present from the Past (from August to October), playing Frances on the show's tour. In 1994, she portrayed the lead antagonist role of Annie Wilkes in Misery, a play based on the 1987 Stephen King novel of the same name, playing opposite Bryan Murray, who portrayed the protagonist, Paul Sheldon. The tour began on 16 May at the King's Theatre in Scotland, and concluded on 23 July at the New Theatre, Cardiff.

Beginning in April 1995, she began starring as Freda Caplan in J. B. Priestley's play Dangerous Corner, replacing Gayle Hunnicutt and acting alongside Christopher Timothy. She remained in a primary capacity until the show finished in July. In July 1996, she captured the lead role of Lady Macbeth in her second Shakespeare production, Macbeth, performing at the Stafford Castle for the show's two-week run. From August to September 1997, she performed at the Chichester Festival Theatre in the W. Somerset Maugham play, Our Betters, as Duchesse de Surenne. From 26 May to 12 September 1998, she played Vivienne Trent in the tour of Dangerous to Know, based on the 1995 Barbara Taylor Bradford novel of the same name.

In 1996 she featured in the music video Never Never Love (song) for Simply Red.

=== 2002–present: Return from hiatus; Celebrity Big Brother and Coronation Street ===
Lenska took four years off acting in the aftermath of her divorce from Dennis Waterman. She returned to theatre as a part of the ensemble cast of Masterpieces from May to June 2002. In July, Lenska, alongside Angie Le Mar and Tilly Blackwood, joined the cast of The Vagina Monologues U.K. tour, beginning at the Arts Theatre in London.

In 2003, Lenska made her return to film, after a 22 year gap, in the starring role of Dee Perry in the low budget black comedy film Paradise Grove, acting opposite Ron Moody. In 2004, she would appear in the crime film Fakers, as Sylvia Creat. In March 2004, she began playing Helene Hanff in 84, Charing Cross Road, based on the 1970 book of the same name.

In January 2005, Lenska began performing at the Perth Theatre, playing the role of Stella in A Sense of Justice until 12 February. She then played middle-aged mother Irina in the independent film Gypo, which was the first UK feature film to be made under Dogme rules; she played a Romani refugee from the Czech Republic living on a caravan site in Margate. In December 2005, she appeared on stage with the London Gay Men's Chorus for their Christmas Show, Make the Yuletide Gay. She sang and danced while also hosting the show at Symphony Hall in Birmingham, the Dome Concert Hall in Brighton and the Barbican Centre in London.

Lenska's work on tour with the London Gay Men's Chorus is assumed to have prompted her participation in the United Kingdom version of Celebrity Big Brother in January 2006. Her reason for accepting the invitation to go on the show was "I'm a crazy Polish countess who likes a challenge". During the show, she declared that she had been a "Tibetan Buddhist" for many years but had been practising Nichiren Daishonin for two years. On 13 January 2006, alongside fellow housemate, Scottish politician and then-Respect Party MP George Galloway, she attracted the attention of the media by indulging in a role-play task set by Celebrity Big Brother, in which Galloway pretended to be a cat licking milk from her cupped hands, and Lenska stroked his ears and moustache.

At the equivalent show in December 2006, Sandi Toksvig corrupted the lyrics of a song to suggest Lenska had a Christmas job in Debenhams. In 2007, she toured alongside Marti Webb and Sheila Ferguson in a new musical about menopause called Hot Flush. and hosted a mini-show at Lutterworth Piano Rooms 3 November 2012.

She starred in the independent British film Jack Says (2008), opposite her one-time EastEnders co-star Mike Reid. That same year she lent her voice to the animation film Agent Crush. In 2009, Lenska joined the cast of Coronation Street as new character Claudia Colby, an old friend of Audrey Roberts. In May 2011, Lenska left the role to join the Calendar Girls tour in August 2011.

In 2013, Lenska published her autobiography, Rula: My Colourful Life. Lizzie Catt of The Daily Express gave My Colourful Life a 4/5 rating.

In 2016, she appeared in a Christmas special episode of the comedy Inside No. 9.

She reprised her role in Coronation Street in July 2018, before leaving the show again in April 2020. Lenska returned as Claudia for Norris Cole's funeral in September 2021, and returned again in August 2022. In May 2022, Lenska joined the cast of the stage adaptation of The Best Exotic Marigold Hotel. She is a regular performer (and part of the original cast) of the touring play Seven Deadly Sins Four Deadly Sinners.

In June 2026, Lenska was announced to be guest starring on Channel 5's The Good Ship Murder in its forthcoming fourth series.

== Personal life ==
Lenska has been married twice, first to actor Brian Deacon (4 June 1977 – 1987), with whom she had one daughter, and secondly to actor Dennis Waterman, from 3 January 1987 until 31 March 1998. Both marriages ended in divorce.

She and Waterman met on the set of Minder in 1981 where their characters had a brief love interest. Some years after Lenska's second marriage ended, in a March 2012 interview with Piers Morgan, Waterman said: "It's not difficult for a woman to make a man hit her. She certainly wasn't a beaten wife, she was hit and that's different." Via her friend, Denise Welch on Loose Women, Lenska said that she was relieved that he had now admitted beating her. Lenska had made allegations against Waterman shortly after their split and thought she could no longer be accused of lying. In her 2013 autobiography, Rula: My Colourful Life, Lenska wrote about Waterman's infidelities, which included an affair with actress Amanda Redman.

In 2016, Lenska was sentenced to a 16-month driving ban and ordered to pay a total of £526 after crashing her car while under the influence of alcohol. Her three-year-old grandson was a passenger in the car. A large portrait of the Countess hangs in the stairway of Ognisko Polskie, the Polish Hearth Club, at 55 Princes Gate, London, the wartime home of the exiled Polish government.

== Filmography ==
=== Film ===
Year	Title	Role	Notes
1974	Soft Beds, Hard Battles	Louise	
1975	Alfie Darling	Louise	
1975	Confessions of a Pop Performer	Receptionist	
1975	Royal Flash	Helga	
1976	It Could Happen to You	Rita	
1976	The Deadly Females	Luisa	
1976	Queen Kong	Luce Habit	
1979	Jesus	Herodias	Scene cut
1981	The Seven Dials Mystery	Countess Radzsky	
2003	Paradise Grove	Dee Perry	
2004	Fakers	Sylvia Creat	
2005	Gypo	Irina	
2008	Jack Says	Garvey	
2008	Agent Crush	Olga Thyburn	Voice role
2014	Bait	Linda	
2018	The Exorcism of Karen Walker	Ada	
2022	The Huntress of Auschwitz	Amelia Kaminska	
2022	The Winter Witch	Omi	
2023	The Picture of Dorian Gray	Narrator	Voice role
2023	Alice in Terrorland	Beth	
2024	The Kingdom by the Sea	Linda	

=== Television ===
Year	Title	Role	Notes
1965	Dixon of Dock Green	Policewoman	Uncredited
1971	The Doctors	Josee Erlander	2 episodes
1973	Once Upon a Time	Prince Charming	Episode: "Buttons"
1974	Special Branch	Lydia	Episode: "Something About a Soldier"
1974	Marked Personal	Roz	2 episodes
1975	Edward the Seventh	Hortense Schneider	Episode: "The Invisible Queen"
1975	The Brothers	Fiona Lester	Episode: "End of a Dream"
1975	Space: 1999	Joan Conway	Episode: "Alpha Child"
1976	Red Letter Day	Ms. Fandom	Episode: "Amazing Stories"
1976	Rock Follies	Nancy "Q" Cunard de Longchamps	All 6 episodes
1977	Leap in the Dark	Katerina	Episode: "Dream Me a Winner"
1977	Rock Follies of '77	Nancy "Q" Cunard de Longchamps	All 6 episodes
1979	Return of the Saint	Diana Lang	Episode: "Hot Run"
1979	BBC Play of the Month	Gilda	Episode: "Design for Living"
1980	The Cuckoo Waltz	Holly Galinsky	Episode: "A Love That Does Not Dim"
1980	Leap in the Dark	Harriet	Episode: "Watching Me, Watching You"
1980	The Big Show	Herself	Episode 7
1981	The Seven Dials Mystery	Countess Radzsky	Television film
1981	Private Schulz	Gertrude Steiner	Series 1: Episode 4
1981	Take a Letter Mr. Jones	Joan Warner	All 6 episodes
1981	To the Manor Born	Mademoiselle Dutoit	Episode: "Cosmetics"
1982	BBC2 Playhouse	Mabel	Episode: "Aubrey"
1982	Minder	Kate	Episode: "The Birdman of Wormwood Scrubs"
1983	Conversations with a Stranger	Italian Woman	Television film
1984	Doctor Who	Styles	Episode: "Resurrection of the Daleks"
1984	Robin of Sherwood	Morgwyn of Ravenscar	Episode: "The Swords of Wayland"
1985	Minder	Natasha	Episode: "From Fulham with Love"
1988	Mr. H Is Late	Bride	Television film
1988	Boon	Renata Cartwright	Episode: "Never Say Trevor Again"
1989	Minder	Sandra Last	Episode: "The Last Video Show"
1991	Cluedo	Mrs. Peacock	6 episodes
1991	Family Pride	Eva	Unknown episodes
1991	An Actor's Life for Me	Marjorie	Episode: "May the Farce Be with You"
1992	Kappatoo	Zeta	7 episodes
1992	The Mixer	Lady Pamela Osgood	2 episodes
1993	Stay Lucky	Isabel Stevens	2 episodes
1994	The Detectives	Duchess	Episode: "Never Without Protection"
1996	One Foot in the Grave	Fenella Fortune	Episode: "Starbound"
2002	EastEnders	Krystal	4 episodes
2005	Footballers' Wives	Allana	1 episode
2006	Doctors	Vicky Mullen	Episode: "Blaze of Glory"
2007	M.I. High	Vanessa Zeitgeist	Episode: "Forever Young"
2009	Grandpa in My Pocket	Princess Purpelovna	Episode: "Princess Purpelovna's Plan"
2009–2011, 2018–2022	Coronation Street	Claudia Colby	Regular role; 149 episodes
2011	Ideal	The Red King	Episode: "The Red King"
2016	Casualty	Vera Vintner	Episode: "Where the Truth Lies"
2016	Inside No. 9	Celia Devonshire	Episode: "The Devil of Christmas"
2025	Mr. Bigstuff	Rita	Episode: #2.2

=== Stage ===
Dates	Show	Role	Director	Notes
8 – 26 June 1971; 30 September 1971 – June 1973	Suddenly at Home	Ruth Bechler	Basil Coleman	Theatre Royal, Windsor (June 1971); Fortune Theatre (1971–73)
27 – 29 May 1974	Abel, Where is Your Brother?		Amos Mokadi	Act-Inn Theatre Club
24 October – 12 November 1977	Flare Path	Patricia	Kim Grant	Tour
5 June 1978	A Midsummer Night's Dream	Titania	David Conville	Regent's Park Open Air Theatre
12 December 1981 – January 1982	Aladdin	Aladdin	Roger Redfarn	Richmond Theatre, Surrey
19 April – 27 November 1982	Mr. Fothergill's Murder	Judith Hayne	David Kirk	Tour
13 December 1984 – 12 January 1985	Cinderella	Prince Charming	Peter Purves	Beck Theatre
16 September – 14 December 1985	Same Time, Next Year	Doris	John Wood	The Old Vic
May – 12 June 1986	Double Double	Phillipa James	Leon Rubin	Tour
19 December 1987 – 7 February 1988	Robinson Crusoe	Robinson Crusoe	Tudor Davies	Wimbledon Theatre
20 September – 19 November 1988; 13 February – 1 July 1989	Blithe Spirit	Elvira	John David	Tour
6 June – 14 July 1990	Temptation	Valerie Vilma	James Roose-Evans	Westminster Theatre
19 December 1991 – 2 February 1992	Dick Whittington	Dick Whittington	Alan Harding	Wimbledon Theatre
16 April – 2 May 1992	A Little Night Music	Desiree Armfeldt	Roger Redfarn	Theatre Royal, Plymouth
19 May – 12 June 1993	The Cherry Orchard	Lyuba Ranyevskaya	Graham Watkins	Redgrave Theatre, Farnham
3 August – 16 October 1993	Present from the Past	Frances	Euan Smith	Tour
16 May – 23 July 1994	Misery	Annie Wilkes	Patrick Connellan	Tour
12 December 1994 – 14 January 1995	Aladdin	Aladdin	Michael Eakin	The Hexagon
1 November 1994 – 1 July 1995	Dangerous Corner	Freda Caplan	Keith Baxter	Tour
2 – 13 July 1996	Macbeth	Lady Macbeth	Julia Stafford Northcote	Stafford Castle
6 August – 27 September 1997	Our Betters	Duchesse de Surenne	Michael Rudman	Chichester Festival Theatre
18 December 1997 – 1 February 1998	Snow White and the Seven Dwarfs	The Red Queen	Lionel Blair	New Victoria Theatre
26 May – 12 September 1998	Dangerous to Know	Vivienne Trent	Roger Redfarn	Tour
17 December 1998 – 23 January 1999	Snow White and the Seven Dwarfs	The Red Queen	Lionel Blair	Churchill Theatre
5 September – 25 November 2000	An Inspector Calls	Mrs. Birling	Stephen Daldry	Tour
29 May – 15 June 2002	Masterpieces	Ensemble Cast	Christopher Luscombe; Malcolm McKee	Birmingham Reperatory Theatre
13 December 2002 – 5 January 2003	Jack and the Beanstalk	Jack	Gerry Tebbutt	Yvonne Arnaud Theatre
5 – 10 April 2004	84 Charing Cross Road	Helene Hanff	James Roose-Evans	Royal Theatre, Northampton
14 September – 23 October 2004	Pride and Prejudice	Mrs. Bennett	Sue Pomeroy	Tour
28 January – 12 February 2005	A Sense of Justice	Stella	Ken Alexander	Perth Theatre
9 April – 1 December 2007	Hot Flush!	Myra	Alan Cohen	Tour
2 April – 10 May 2008	That's Love	Sarah Daniels	Ron Aldridges	The Mill at Sonning
6 October – 15 November 2008	Don't Look Now	Sister 1	Ian Dickens	Tour
December 2008 – 4 January 2009	Jack and the Beanstalk	The Enchantress	Chris Dunham	Connaught Theatre
5 December 2009 – 3 January 2010	Cinderella	Fairy Godmother		The Hexagon
13 July – 7 August 2010	Lingua Franca	Irena Brentano	Michael Gieleta	Finborough Theatre
30 August – 3 December 2011	Calendar Girls The Musical	Celia – Miss September	David Pugh; Dafydd Rogers	Tour
16 October 2013	The Hitch Hiker's Guide to the Galaxy	Voice of the Book	Dirk Maggs	Grand Opera House, Belfast
16 – 21 June 2014	Pygmalion	Mrs. Higgins	David Grindley	Theatre Royal, Norwich
7 – 17 January 2015	The Frozen Scream	Aunt Agatha	Christopher Green	Birmingham Hippodrome
6 August – 26 September 2015	Love, Loss and What I Wore	Various roles	Sarah Berger	The Mill at Sonning
10 January – 17 November 2018	The Case of the Frightened Lady	Lady Lebanon	Roy Marsden	Tour
5 September 2022 – June 2023; 24 April – 15 October 2024	The Best Exotic Marigold Hotel	Madge Hardcastle Evelyn	Lucy Bailey	UK and New Zealand tour

=== Video games ===
Year	Title	Role	Notes
2013	The Night of the Rabbit	Phosphera	Voice
2013	The Raven: Legacy of a Master Thief	Baroness von Trebitz	Voice

== See also ==
- Łubieński family
- Poles in the United Kingdom
