= The Animals of Farthing Wood =

Novel series by Colin Dann

- Cover of a 2006 paperback edition of the first book in the series
- The Animals of Farthing Wood; In the Grip of Winter; Fox's Feud; The Fox Cub Bold; The Siege of White Deer Park; In the Path of the Storm; Battle for the Park; Farthing Wood: The Adventure Begins
- Author: Colin Dann
- Illustrator: Jacqueline Tettmar
- Cover artist: Frances Broomfield
- Country: United Kingdom
- Language: English
- Genre: Children's, Fantasy novel
- Publisher: Heinemann (UK), Goodchild (U.S.)
- Published: 12 November 1979
- Media type: Print (Hardback & Paperback)

The Animals of Farthing Wood is a series of books about a group of woodland animals. It originated with the 1979 book, The Animals of Farthing Wood, by Colin Dann, and was followed by six sequels and a prequel by Dann. An animated Animals of Farthing Wood television series based on the books aired in the 1990s, created by the European Broadcasting Union.

The books tell the story of a group of woodland animals whose home has been paved over by developers. They learn of a nature reserve, White Deer Park, where they will be safe, and undertake to make the journey together. They form an Oath, promising to protect one another and overcome their natural instincts until they reach their destination.

== Publication history ==
The Animals of Farthing Wood, the first book in the series, was first published by John Goodchild Publishers in the United Kingdom in the first half of 1979 as two separate paperbacks. The first was known as Escape from Danger and the second was known as The Way to White Deer. They were later released as one novel.

The original book was meant to be a stand-alone book, with the animals reaching White Deer Park at the end. The success of the book led to a further six novels detailing the adventures of the animals once they reached White Deer Park, and a prequel showing how Farthing Wood came to be destroyed. The cover illustrations for this original series were painted by Portal artist Frances Broomfield.

Dann revealed in an interview with the "Green Action" radio programme on Q96 that the two-book version was special-issue for a children's book club that operated through British primary schools and included some illustrations left out of the original.

In the Grip of Winter was published in 1981, Fox's Feud was published in 1982, and The Fox Cub Bold was published in 1983. An omnibus edition of all three books was published in 1994 by Hutchinson. The Siege of White Deer Park was first published in 1985, In the Path of the Storm was first published in 1989, and Battle for the Park was first published in 1992. Those three books were made into a second omnibus in 1995 by Hutchinson.

In 1994, the last book in the series, Farthing Wood: The Adventure Begins, was released.

== See also ==
- Farthings Wood
