= Ludwik Maria Łubieński =

Polish diplomat and wartime officer

- Born: 6 May 1912; Kazimierza Wielka, Kielce Governorate, Congress Poland, Russian Empire
- Died: 22 January 1996 (aged 83); London
- Education: University of Jan Kazimierz
- Occupations: military officer, diplomat, administrator
- Known for: eye-witness to the Władysław Sikorski air disaster in Gibraltar
- Spouse: Elżbieta Tyszkiewicz
- Parents: Leon Kazimierz Łubieński (father); Leopoldyna Hutten-Czapska (mother)
- Relatives: Feliks Łubieński; Tekla Teresa Łubieńska, x3 great grandparents Rula Lenska (daughter); Gabriela (daughter); Anna (daughter)
- Military career
- Allegiance: Poland
- Branch: Polish Land Forces, Ministry of Foreign Affairs (Poland)
- Service years: 1937-1968
- Rank: Adjutant, Major
- Conflicts: World War II
- Awards: Polonia Restituta, Order of Polonia Restituta
- Other work: Media and government official in exile

Ludwik Maria Łubieński, comte de Pomian (6 May 1912, Kazimierza Wielka - 22 January 1996, London) was a Polish lawyer, diplomat and military officer. He was Head of the Polish Maritime Mission in Gibraltar during World War II and an eyewitness of the air disaster whose victim was the Polish wartime Premier and military leader, Władysław Sikorski. After the war, he became an expatriate official in Munich and London.

== Background ==
From an old Polish noble and accomplished family, Łubieński's parents were Leon Kazimierz Łubieński, landowner and diplomat member of the Polish delegation to the Paris Peace Conference (1919–1920), and his second wife, Leopoldyna Hutten-Czapska, sister of the military officer and artist, Józef Czapski. He was the youngest son of four children born on the family estate in Kazimierza Wielka. He married Elżbieta Tyszkiewicz, with whom he had three children after the war in England. They were: Róża, whose stage name is Rula Lenska, Gabriela and Anna. The family settled in London.

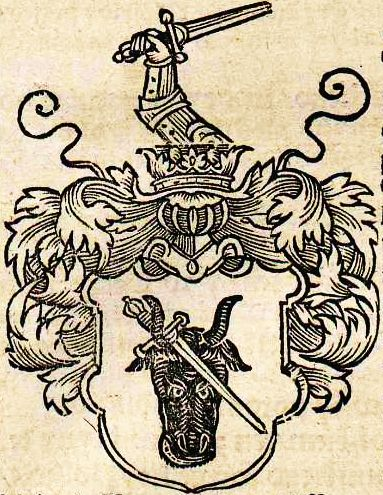
Pomian coat of arms, Paprocki 1584

== Career ==
In 1934 he graduated in law from the University of Jan Kazimierz. In August 1937 he was posted as a consular official of the Second Polish Republic to Rome. On 3 July 1939, he was named secretary to the minister of Foreign Affairs, Józef Beck. With the clouds of war gathering, on 25 August 1939, he was nominated as liaison officer between the Ministry of Foreign Affairs and the Office of the Chief of staff of Polish Forces. On 18 September 1939, he accompanied Beck, over the "Green Border", into Romania. From there, as the Polish Government of Poland sought sanctuary in France, he was deputed to the Polish holding camp in Cerizay, France. From March 1940 he was in the United Kingdom, initially attached to gen. Bronisław Regulski, in charge of the Polish Panzer Division in France. Between 1941 and 1943 he was a special officer in the office of the Supreme Chief. In March 1943 he was posted to Gibraltar as Head of the Polish Maritime Mission. On 4 July 1943, he personally witnessed the air disaster in which 11 passengers and five crew died, most notably Poland's then leader, gen. Władysław Sikorski. Based on Łubieński's eye-witness report, James Robert Norton-Amora, a British government official in Gibraltar, issued the General's death certificate. An enduring controversy arose about the tragic event over the sea and the veracity of Łubieński's testimony has been called into question by a number of historians. Łubieński was the first person to alert the Polish government-in-exile in London about the death of gen. Sikorski in the air disaster.

From September 1943 he was liaison officer of the Supreme Headquarters Allied Expeditionary Force in Algiers and Naples. From June 1944 to September 1949 he served as Aide-de-camp to gen. Władysław Anders.

=== Expatriate administrator ===
After the war, between 1949 and 1958 he was employed in the office of gen. Anders. From 1958 to 1968 he was European director of the American Polonia, based in Munich. Between 1968 and 1979 he was manager of the production office of Free Europe Polish Section, from where he retired. Back in London from 1982 to 1991 he served as a member of the Rada Narodowa Rzeczypospolitej Polskiej (National Council of Poland) of the Polish government-in-exile. Also between 1981 and 1990 he headed the commission for winding up of the Treasury (Skarb Narodowy (1949–1991)). In 1988 he was deputy head of the Aid for Refugees commission. He died in London in January 1996. He was buried in Kazimierza Wielka.

== Honours and decorations ==
- Commander's Cross with Star of the Order of Polonia Restituta (1989)
- Order of Polonia Restituta, Commander's Cross, (3 May 1984)

== Bibliography ==
- Słownik Biograficzny Polskiej Służby Zagranicznej 1918-1945. Vol. IV, publisher, Ministerstwo Spraw Zagranicznych. Warsaw 2007 (in Polish)
- Kisielewski,„Tadeusz. Zamach. Tropem zabójców generała Sikorskiego, REBIS: 2007, ISBN 83-7301-767-4.
- Kisielewski, Tadeusz (1 January 2002). "Tajemnice tragedii w Gibraltarze: Część pierwsza opowieści o śmierci Generała Sikorskiego". Mówią Wieki (in Polish). ISSN 1230-4018.
- Przybyszewski Stanisław M., Ludwik Łubieński, żołnierz, dyplomata, emigrant rodem z Kazimierzy Wielkiej, publisher, Nowa Nidzica: 2014 (in Polish)
- Lenska, Rula (2013). Rula: My Colourful Life. United Kingdom: Robson Press. ISBN 978-1849545501.

== See also ==
- 1943 Gibraltar Liberator AL523 crash
- Władysław Sikorski's death controversy
- Łubieński family
