= List of The Animals of Farthing Wood episodes =

This is the list of episodes from The Animals of Farthing Wood.

== Series overview ==
| Series | Episodes | Originally released | |
| Series | Episodes | First released | Last released |
|---|---|---|---|
| 1 | 13 | 6 January 1993 | 31 March 1993 |
| 2 | 13 | 29 September 1994 | 22 December 1994 |
| 3 | 13 | 28 September 1995 | 21 December 1995 |

== Episodes ==
=== Season 1 (1993) ===
All 13 episodes were produced in 1992.

| No. overall | No. in series | Title | Original release date |
|---|---|---|---|
| 1 | 1 | "The Wood in Danger" | 6 January 1993 |
Toad returns home to Farthing Wood after a long and difficult journey, but the wood is being felled to create a town and he is buried. Meanwhile, other animals discover that Farthing Wood Pond has been filled in, and the only remaining stream is now just a muddy trickle. Fox proposes 'an Assembly', a gathering of all the animals, in the hope that someone may have an idea. Badger arranges the meeting in his glowworm filled set at dusk. Owl at first refuses to go underground, but eventually relents, setting the standard for the other birds. She is followed by the Newts, Kestrel, the Squirrels, the Rabbits, the Mice, the Voles, the Hares, the Pheasants, the Shrews, the Hedgehogs, and finally Fox and Adder (to the dismay of the smaller creatures). Mole arrives late, unaware a meeting has even been called. As the animals discuss the problem, Toad breaks out of the ground and makes his way towards the set, coming through the roof. He tells how he was captured in a jam jar, and has been travelling back to his pond ever since. He is dismayed when Owl tells him that it has been filled in. Fox declares that they have to find a new home, or perish. Toad, luckily, has a suggestion; they head to a place where humans protect animals rather than hunt them, called 'White Deer Park'. Some are skeptical, but with no alternative, Fox agrees this is their best bet. Hare points out that carnivores would be placed near their natural prey, so Badger suggests they take the "Oath of Mutual Protection", that is, no animal will 'terrorize nor consume' another. All animals take the oath, although Adder is less than pleased. Badger nominates Fox as their leader, and Toad as their guide. The animals agree to meet at midnight to begin their great journey.
| 2 | 2 | "The Journey Begins" | 13 January 1993 |
The animals meet to start their journey to White Deer Park, but Mole refuses to join his fellow animals after hearing Adder calling him, among other insults, slow. As the rest begin, Badger waits behind and is able to persuade Mole he will not be a burden, by carrying him on his back. As they leave the wood, the smaller animals begin to panic about the length of the journey, and the Newts become concerned for their child's health without water. Owl finds a house with a swimming pool, and quickly directs the animals to it. Toad and the Newts go for a swim whilst the other animals drink. Things nearly end in disaster when Toad, the Rabbits and Hares cause a commotion with a lilo. As the lights come on, Adder winds up in the pool, and has to be pulled out by Fox. The group makes their escape as a fat Cat tries to come out and eat the Mice. The animals become tired as dawn breaks and begin looking for a safe place to rest. Kestrel is able to locate some army land, but the animals must cross a road to reach it. Most do so safely, but Adder's slow progress puts her in danger, and she narrowly escapes being run over thanks to Badger. Toad collapses in front of a truck, but is saved by Owl and Fox. The animals then fall asleep in the cover of a gorse thicket.
| 3 | 3 | "Through Fire and Through Water" | 20 January 1993 |
The animals awake in the army land several hours later to the sound of blasting cannons. The two baby rabbits become hysterical and are only just stopped from running back onto the road by the hissing Adder. Fortunately, after Weasel provokes a hive of wasps, the soldiers run away from the stinging insects, and the animals can move on. The party eventually have a small break at a nearby marsh in order to drink and find food. At this point, the Newt family decide the journey is too challenging and resolve to stay at the marsh, after Toad tells them that they will do just as well here as at White Deer Park. The rest carry on, until one of the squirrels finds a live bullet. They throw it in a panic and it explodes, ruining Pheasant's tail, which aggravates him greatly. Subsequently, when a careless smoker drops his cigarette, a massive fire sweeps across the army land, which nearly kills the exhausted Toad until he is rescued by Fox. The fire spreads to the stretch of marsh where the Newts have made their new home, and Badger presumes they have perished. Mole is separated from the others while eating worms below ground and is found by firemen and placed in a jacket. The rest manage to escape the flames by swimming onto an island in the middle of a lake, whilst firemen bring an end to the flames. Mole escapes and is then spotted by Kestrel. She and Owl provide a distraction so Fox can retrieve Mole. It soon begins to rain and the animals start swimming to the other side of the lake, planning to reach safe farm land. Presumed death of the Newts.
| 4 | 4 | "False Haven" | 27 January 1993 |
A journey through very muddy terrain brings the animals to the border fence, but they are unable to rest comfortably due to rain. Toad finds a dry, warm barn for the animals on the farm land, so the animals quickly set off again. Once inside the barn, Fox is worried about their close proximity to humans, but Kestrel, Owl and Mr. Pheasant all agree to take turns keeping watch from a plum tree. However, Pheasant is too busy sleeping when his turn comes, so his wife takes his place, only to fall asleep herself. She hears the Farmer and his dog too late, and is shot. The party is soon discovered and locked in the barn, with the farmer planning to kill Fox after having his dinner. Adder distracts Bruno the dog whilst the small animals eat through the floorboards, allowing Mole and Badger to dig a tunnel out. After everybody else flees, Adder goes to ground, and Fox manages to outwit Bruno, persuading him that killing Fox will rob the farmer of the satisfaction of doing the job himself. The group are able to carry on walking until they reach a small copse in order to rest, until they realise Adder is still hiding at the farm. Death of Mrs. Pheasant.
| 5 | 5 | "Snare for the Unwary" | 3 February 1993 |
The usually-cowardly Pheasant volunteers to go back to the farm to find Adder. Despite Adder's warnings, he makes too much noise when he sees his wife's plucked roasted corpse, and he too is shot. Owl then flies on to find Adder at sunset, and both have a conversation about the possible demise of Fox as the group leader, while enjoying a house rat killed by Adder for dinner. At the copse, the animals make friends with the local rooks and spend the evening listening to their singing, and that of Weasel and Toad. Owl and Adder rejoin in the morning, only to find one of the baby rabbits trapped in a snare. Luckily he is freed when Owl suggests Mole dig the snare out of the ground. Leaving the copse, the animals attempt to cross a river, but the rabbits panic and Fox exhausts himself carrying them. Badger tries to help Fox out of the river but they are swept away by some massive drift wood. Death of Mr. Pheasant.
| 6 | 6 | "Who Shall Wear the Crown?" | 10 February 1993 |
Far down the river, Badger is spotted tangled in some reeds and Toad, Hare, Hedgehog and Weasel haul him out. Kestrel attempts to find Fox but loses sight of him under a bridge. Although the animals begin debating about who should replace Fox, Badger takes charge as soon as Kestrel returns and decides to press on. However, Toad loses his sense of direction, leading the animals back to the river. Owl realises that Toad's homing instinct, which led him back to Farthing Wood originally, is affecting his judgement. After Kestrel scouts ahead and reports back, Toad remembers the way again. Before the animals can make much progress, they are forced to stop when the Mice have babies. Badger and the others are faced with a dilemma, as going on will slow down the group even more, but leaving the Mice behind will mean they can no longer be protected, and they may suffer the fate that likely befell the Newts. Even farther downstream, it is shown that Fox climbs onto a boat taking him back up the river, but he has been spotted by humans at a lock gate in a town.
| 7 | 7 | "New Friends, Old Enemies" | 17 February 1993 |
When he is spotted at the lock gate, Fox flees into the town and takes refuge in an alleyway. There, he meets a cat named Tom and agrees to hunt rats in return for shelter. After hunting, Fox rests in a box which is loaded onto a truck and taken back into the countryside, where he escapes. He meets a friendly horse and takes a rest, only then discovering this area is where a large amount of fox-hunting takes place. Fox bids the horse goodbye, and heads off again, discovering a fox den to rest in. However, a female fox called Vixen returns and allows Fox to stay for a time, then invites him to go hunting. Meanwhile, after a long debate, the Voles stay behind with the Mice, while the rest of the Farthing Wood animals decide to continue their journey. Soon, Hare sees a shrike carrying a baby mouse and alerts Badger. Hare quickly heads back to the Voles and Field Mice, only to see the baby mice in a grisly scene: killed and brutally impaled on thorns by the shrike. Hare continues on to find the Voles and Field Mice cowering in fear; they agree to rejoin the journey to White Deer Park. Introduction of Vixen. Death of the Baby Mice.
| 8 | 8 | "Friends in Need" | 24 February 1993 |
Fox and Vixen go hunting. Fox tells Vixen about his friends and how he lost them, while Vixen tells him about the fox hunts that happen in the area. Fox and Vixen meet the Big Owl, who informs him that he spoke with the Farthing Wood Owl. With his guidance, the pair quickly locate the trail of the other animals and set off in pursuit. Elsewhere Mole, unbeknownst to Badger, has 'lost his transport' as the Farthing Wood animals climb a steep hill out of the woodland. Later the Foxes reach the point where Toad's homing instinct led the animals astray, and split up to investigate both scent trails. Vixen follows the trail leading back to the river, but soon realises it is the wrong path and decides to rejoin Fox. However, a fox hunt picks up her scent and starts chasing her through the wood. Fox, hearing the hunt, bravely attempts to rescue her, before running into his friends on the hill. Vixen nearly meets her end, until Adder strikes out at the Master's horse, and the hunt is called off. Knowing that Fox tried to save her, Vixen happily agrees to become his mate, and the Farthing Wood animals make a new friend.
| 9 | 9 | "Whistler's Quarry" | 3 March 1993 |
After escaping the Hunt for now, the animals reach a large quarry (with Mole digging their way in). Here they meet Whistler, a grey heron named for the wind whistling through a bullet hole in his wing when he flies. When Toad tries to fish, he is caught by a carp. Before he can be swallowed, Whistler fetches the carp from the water and returns him to the shore. Pitying the carp, Toad asks him to throw it back. An intrigued Whistler complies, and discusses the motivation of the animals and how their journey has changed them for the better. He then confesses he finds life at the quarry quite lonely, and asks to join the animals on their journey in the hopes of finding a mate at White Deer Park. Whistler therefore takes the oath alongside Vixen. The animals leave the quarry in good spirits, but then walk into the middle of a pheasant shoot. The gunshots cause one of the baby rabbits to panic, running out into the open where he is killed. Mrs. Rabbit blamed herself for not properly protecting him, while the others were left in awe, thinking back at the copse of how they saved him from the snare, only to be shot in the pheasant shoot. Introduction of Whistler. Death of a Baby Rabbit.
| 10 | 10 | "Between Two Evils" | 10 March 1993 |
A busy motorway lies ahead of the animals, which was under construction when Toad was making his way back to Farthing Wood. All apart from the Birds are hesitant to cross it. Most want to find another way around and some wish to remain where they are, but the sound of the Hunting horn is heard in the distance. It forces the animals to head to the motorway, and the Hunt eventually turns back. Although some animals, none more so than the Hedgehogs, are frightened of crossing, they agree to head into the middle, as the nearest cars are in a traffic jam. Once all the animals, apart from Adder, reach this point, Whistler agrees to carry the smaller animals over. Toad is carried first, with Fox, Vixen and the Hares running across when a gap in the traffic appears. Whistler carries the Voles, Mice, Shrews and Squirrels over, but is unable to help the Hedgehogs. Weasel gets into a fight with some humans throwing litter and is concussed. She runs onto the road in a daze before Whistler rescues her. Finally Badger (with Mole on his back), the three Rabbits and the Hedgehogs wait for a long gap in the traffic. When it comes, Badger, Mole and the Rabbits all make it across safely, but the instincts of the Hedgehogs overcome them, and they curl up when they see a truck heading towards them and tragically die. Some time later, Adder, who refuses to be humiliated by being carried over by Owl, then suffers a much greater embarrassment by being surprised and carried by Whistler instead. Deaths of Mr. & Mrs. Hedgehog.
| 11 | 11 | "A Deathly Calm" | 17 March 1993 |
The animals find themselves in a large field filled with vegetables. The grass-eating animals are overjoyed with the abundance of food until Fox senses something wrong. He is wary of an unusual smell and the absence of any natural wild-life. Owl discovers the reason for it: poisonous chemicals that the farmer is even concealing from other humans. After the animals enter an orchard as dusk falls, Fox, Vixen, Owl and Whistler head to a nearby town for food. Whistlers brings back some sausages for the meat-eaters and Owl brings back some lettuce for the grass-eaters. Fox and Vixen disturb two dogs and are chased. They split up with both the dogs following Fox, who luckily loses them crossing some railway tracks. Vixen returns to the others alone. Badger decides to set off again, leading the animals into a field that has yet to be sprayed, though Badger still decides that it is safer not to eat anything. When Fox makes it back, a tractor spraying a liquid substance is heading for the animals. Fox has the animals run back to the orchard, where the farmer will not be spraying again, but Mr Rabbit trips and is coated in the substance. As he panics about his imminent death, Fox tells the animals that the poison is only harmful to insects like caterpillars and butterflies at low levels. Fox then comes up with a new plan to escape the fields: rather than head to White Deer Park across the farms around the town, he decides to lead the animals through the town itself.
| 12 | 12 | "Pandemonium" | 24 March 1993 |
The Farthing animals head into the town, but are forced to find shelter when a storm breaks and so make for a church. Mole finds an entrance into the building through some loose bricks in a wall. The animals, now safe from the elements, settle down for the night. At dawn workers close the hole, trapping the party inside. Later, humans enter the Church for a wedding and the animals attempt to sit it out. However, the Mice are frightened by the organ, and chaos ensues, with the animals causing further mayhem in their desperation to escape. Fox, Vixen (with Mole on her back following an accident with a hat), Owl, Kestrel, Whistler, the Baby Rabbit and the Hares follow Toad, only realising that they have become separated when they are a short distance from White Deer Park. Badger and Weasel hide in a wine cellar in the town, The Squirrels end up clinging to a telegraph pole on the edge of town, Adder follows the Mice, Voles and Shrews into the long grass and Mr and Mrs Rabbit hide in a bush just outside the town.
| 13 | 13 | "So Near and Yet So Far..." | 31 March 1993 |
When escaping the church some of the animals take wrong turns and end up scattered all over the place. A couple wind up even further inside the town. Badger and Weasel, in a rush to hide, enter a wine cellar. Weasel drinks from one of the barrels and becomes quite drunk. After they escape, with Weasel drunkenly singing all the while, Owl finds the two by a bin where Weasel has passed out. Owl then leads Badger back to the others, while he carries Weasel on his back. Kestrel finds the Squirrels clinging to the telegraph pole on the edge of town and she leads them back to Fox. Later she finds Adder who is (initially by accident for once) chasing the Voles, Mice and Shrews on a golf course. Luckily, Adder's actions save them from a Lawn mower heading their way. Finally, Whistler finds the lost Rabbits on a building site, the pair having fallen into a steep sided pit. Whistler tries to help them out, but Mr Rabbit proves too heavy to carry. Fox eventually rescues them. Once all the animals are reunited they make the last part of the journey to White Deer Park. All the animals agree that Toad should be the first to enter the park. They are all greeted by the Great White Stag, who welcomes them to their new home.

=== Season 2 (1994) ===
All episodes were produced in 1993.

| No. overall | No. in series | Title | Original release date |
|---|---|---|---|
| 14 | 1 | "A Heroes' Welcome" | 29 September 1994 |
The Farthing animals have finally completed their long journey to White Deer Park. They are welcomed by many of the animals like Speedy the female Heron (who mates Whistler), Measly the male Weasel (who mates Weasel) and Frogs named The Edible Frogs. Some are not so pleased to see them. A sinister blue fox called Scarface doesn't want the new arrivals to be in the park and feels that they are trespassing on his territory. The journey over the Oath is no longer needed, but the Farthing animals find it difficult to revert to their old ways before they took the Oath and so continue to uphold it and remain friends. Fox speaks to the Great Stag and together they suggest an area of the park to be allocated for the Farthing creatures to live together how they wish. Death of Mrs. Mouse and one of the Edible Frogs.
| 15 | 2 | "Winter" | 6 October 1994 |
A harsh winter arrives and the Farthing animals are finding food scarce, especially because their recent arrival left them unable to stock food. Whistler and Speedy spare some of their fish for the meat-eaters, but the animals soon become sick of the same diet. While out hunting Fox and Vixen meet Scarface and his mate Lady Blue. Vixen tries to start a conversation with them but Scarface warns her to stay on her own land. Meanwhile Badger slips in the heavy snow while out walking and is injured. The Park Warden finds him and takes him back to his home to treat him. The other animals worry for their missing friend. Badger manages to persuade the Warden's cat to inform the others that he is safe. While the cat is telling Mole about Badger being with him at his cottage, Kestrel spots them and thinks Mole is in danger. She dives on the cat, injuring him and causing him to fall to the ground in pain.
| 16 | 3 | "Survival" | 13 October 1994 |
When smaller animals have another dispute about the fear of being eaten by larger animals, arguing ensures between them and the birds of prey. This leaves Mrs. Vole unprotected, giving Scarface enough time to leap out of his territory to snatch her. Weasel saw it all, and soon manages to clear Fox's reputation by telling the truth when Fox is being presumed of resorting to eating Mrs. Vole. Scarface, however, corners Weasel and, thinking that nobody knows, threatens her into becoming his spy. Meanwhile Mole, Kestrel and Vixen nurse the Warden's Cat back to health. Owl proposes to once again resort to scavenging, and most of them leave for the night, with Mole left to guard the injured cat. The cat then pretends to falling asleep, and when Mole himself does, he returns home, not wanting to stay near wild animals any longer. Days later Badger is released from the Warden's cottage and is quite irritated to find out that none of his friends came to meet him (this undoubtedly because they did not know he was coming but he completely ignore it). Upon finding Mole and the others, Badger tries to persuade them that the Warden's cottage is the best place to spend winter, much to his anger nobody follows him back. Much to his surprise, Badger finds himself forbidden to return to the cottage because he is a wild animal, with the cat standing ground. Kestrel, who followed Badger, finally speaks reason into him, but is then herself attacked by the cat in revenge, with Badger having no other choice but to fend off the cat. During that time, two blue foxes were killed after trying to steal food and Scarface swears revenge for this. Death of Mother Vole and two blue foxes.
| 17 | 4 | "New Enemies" | 20 October 1994 |
Spring is coming slowly to White Deer Park. One morning Mr. Mouse perishes. Owl tells the animals that two men took the Warden out of his cottage and put him in a white van and thought that he was very ill but he will be back in the spring; meanwhile a woman took his cat out in a basket. Mole makes a mate called Mateless and will be with her for the Winter. However, one night deer poachers arrive in the park, shooting a deer dead. The Farthing Wood animals go on alert, but the poachers return and shoot another deer. Fox announces a plan to stop the poachers; the next day, Scarface hears about it and pounces on Weasel for not informing him. The other Farthing Wood animals find her acting strangely when she avoids them to stay ignorant. That evening, one of the poachers who had seen Fox intends to shoot him first. Fox gets away from the poachers when they fall into the unfreezing pond. The animals congratulate Fox on his brilliant plan. In the end Vixen tells Fox that he is going to be a father and that she will give birth to cubs. Mr. Vole and Mr. Mouse are confirmed dead.
| 18 | 5 | "A Joke Backfires" | 27 October 1994 |
While Fox orders the rest of the animals to cease their food raids, now that Spring has come and everyone can fend for themselves, Whistler and Kestrel decide to play a joke on Owl by not telling her about Fox's orders. After Owl learns of this, she loses confidence in the Farthing Animals and the oath and fails to alert Fox when the poachers return. Because of this, the poaches kill one of the blue foxes, which causes Scarface to blame Fox for bringing the poachers on all of them, and vowing his revenge. Vixen finally gives birth to her cubs. The animals all gather to congratulate the new parents and to help decide on names for the four cubs. The poachers still plague all the animals in the park but when the warden returns they believe their troubles to be over. However the poachers continue to hunt in the park while the warden remains ignorant to their nightly activities. The Great White Stag and the other deer drive off the poachers for a time, only to have them return later. Fox then sets into motion a plan to get rid of the poachers by bringing them to the attention of the warden. Wandering round in the open and calling out they finally spot him and give chase, straight to the warden's cottage. Hearing gunshots the warden runs out and catches the poachers in the act, putting a stop to their hunting for good and they got arrested for the poaching. The birth of Fox and Vixen's cubs - Bold, Dreamer, Charmer and Friendly; and Scarface and Lady Blue's cubs including Ranger and Bounder, and the Rabbits' offspring. Death of an unnamed blue fox.
| 19 | 6 | "Home Is Where the Heart Is" | 3 November 1994 |
The cubs Bold, Charmer, Dreamer and Friendly are being taught the ways of the world by their parents Fox and Vixen. While Fox is away Scarface spies on the cubs while Vixen is teaching them to hunt. Weasel spots him and bravely informs Vixen, scaring him off by singing, but Vixen doesn't believe her and upsets Weasel. Fox later sniffs the area and believes Weasel may have been telling the truth. Back at his den Scarface's jealously tells Lady Blue that Vixen's cubs are better than hers. After this Lady Blue decides to see the cubs for herself and is confronted by Vixen. Meanwhile Toad has awoken from hibernation confused and his homing instincts drawing him back to Farthing Wood, but is soon caught by a young boy and put into a jar. He becomes fascinated with a female Toad also trapped in a jar and so comes out of his trance. Luckily for them Whistler catches the two occupied jars, dropping one and freeing the female Toad and taking Toad to the warden's cottage to be freed. Toad and the female Toad, Paddock become mates, this new instinct over-riding the homing instinct. The fear that Mole may be dead are confirmed when his mate (now called Mirthful) and two babies meet the animals, but to help Badger avoid any heart-break in his old age Mossy has to pretend to be his father, Mole. Mole is confirmed dead.
| 20 | 7 | "The Feud Begins" | 10 November 1994 |
The animals grieve when Dreamer, Fox and Vixen's cub is found dead. Although it cannot be certain as to the cause of death, Fox believes that Scarface is to blame. The impulsive Bold slips away and wanders into Scarface's land, where he meets Ranger, Scarface's son and tries to become friends. Scarface spots them and imprisons Bold in his earth. Fox and Friendly enter Scarface's land in an attempt to rescue Bold, but soon become surrounded by blue foxes. Fox manages to convince Scarface to allow Friendly to return home. Meanwhile, Bold was able to cunningly escape just as his father and brother trespassed onto the blue foxes' territory. Weasel informs the White Stag about the situation and he steps in to prevent any feuding. Fox is allowed to return to Farthing land, only to find Bold was already there. Fox is infuriated with him and tells him that he will remain where Fox can watch him at all times and is not to wander off. Bold can't take it and feels the park isn't big enough for both him and his father. Vixen pleads with Bold to stay, but he leaves vowing to never return. Death of Dreamer.
| 21 | 8 | "Like Father, Like Son" | 17 November 1994 |
Bold has left White Deer Park and is enjoying his new independent life. He first meets Crow then a friendly female Badger called Shadow when he unintentionally enters her den. He catches a pheasant for her and they become friends. She warns him about the gamekeeper, which explains the abundance of pheasants and a lack of foxes. Shadow gets caught in a trap meant for him and stays to release her when the human is on his way. However as he chews through the wire it springs back, releasing her but catches him in the eye. Later when hunting for pheasants, unable to see out of his injured eye he doesn't notice the farmer until it is too late and Bold is shot. Meanwhile back in White Deer Park, Charmer the remaining female cub of Fox and Vixen meets and befriends Ranger, Scarface's son. Scarface kills Mrs Hare and so Mr Hare moves his family back onto Farthing land. The animals plot to kill Scarface by stealth the way he probably did to kill Dreamer. They elect Adder but make the mistake of sending the Weasels to send the message to her. Adder ends up killing Bounder, Scarface's elder son instead of Scarface himself, leaving the animals of Farthing Wood waiting for the Blue fox's revenge. Death of Mrs. Hare and Bounder.
| 22 | 9 | "Narrow Escapes" | 24 November 1994 |
Bold is helpless and starving due to his gunshot wound but luckily for him Crow agrees to help him and fetches Shadow. She tends to him and stays with him until he feels stronger. But while she goes out hunting he slips away not wanting to be dependent on anyone. He heads towards a farmhouse where Shadow catches up to him. She understands his need to be independent and live his own life and tells him to be careful. He catches a chicken but alerts the farmer and his dog who give chase. Bold dashes down a nearby hole but the farmer tries to dig him out. The farmer manages to dig them out, but Bold pretends he's sleeping so the farmer thinks he got the wrong fox and walks away. Crow tells him that he is extremely lucky and suggests that if he still wants to feed off humans to try the town. The rest of the Farthing Animals are still worried about Scarface. Adder gets cornered by him and hides down a hole but not before he tears her tail. The animals decide to punish the Weasels and hold a trial for them. Fox sets up a watch to look out for any trouble.
| 23 | 10 | "Shadows" | 1 December 1994 |
Bold arrives in the town with Crow and they continue to keep their bargain of feeding one another. While wandering the town for food Bold comes across a female fox but she doesn't seem interested. The following night he sees her again and they hunt together and she, Whisper invites him back to her earth. However he can't break his agreement with Crow so goes back to him. Crow frees him from his agreement so that Bold can be free to see Whisper and says that if they need each other, to leave food under the bush. Bold goes back with Whisper to her earth in the Church grounds and tells her his story when she thinks that he is old. She is honored to know him, the son of the famous, heroic Farthing fox. Meanwhile Friendly finds out that his sister Charmer is seeing Ranger and informs his parents. Fox is not happy about it and agrees to meet him. Ranger says that in a fight between the Blue foxes and the Farthing Wood animals he won't fight for any side. A sad event leaves the animals grieving when Badger passes away. Fox is able to apologize to Badger before he dies, surrounded by all of his friends. Death of Badger.
| 24 | 11 | "A Time of Reckoning" | 8 December 1994 |
Now sharing a den, Bold and Whisper continue to grow closer. With the help of Whisper, Crow, and a St. Bernard dog Rollo whom he befriends, Bold is now finding the struggle for survival less and less of a challenge, but his pride has taken a blow and he can not stand having to rely on others all the time. When Whisper reveals that she is with cub, and wants him to guide her back to White Deer Park, Bold's self-confidence takes another blow; she chose him only to mate since his father was the heroic fox and she wants her children to be like Fox. Whisper denies this, but the journey takes its toll on Bold and he grows steadily weaker. Meanwhile, back in White Deer Park, the feud comes to a head when Vixen and Lady Blue become involved in a vicious fight.
| 25 | 12 | "Blood Is Thicker Than Water" | 15 December 1994 |
Infuriated by Lady Blue's wounds following her fight with Vixen, Scarface leads an attack on the Farthing Wood animals. Fortunately, Hare manages to warn Fox and gather the animals in time. Ranger meanwhile attempts to aid the Farthing Wood animals but, in doing so unintentionally leads Scarface to their whereabouts. Determined to avoid a siege, Fox challenges Scarface to single combat. Scarface initially dominates the fight, but Fox gains the upper hand at a crucial moment. The Warden then appears suddenly, and the victorious Fox allows the injured Scarface to limp away. Meanwhile, Bold and Whisper are halfway to White Deer Park when they were reunited by Shadow who was surprised to see Bold alive but surprised that Bold is going back to White Deer Park despite his vow against returning there while Scarface is making a full recovery from his fight against Fox. Elsewhere, Adder finally emerges from hiding to exact her own vengeance.
| 26 | 13 | "Reconciliation" | 22 December 1994 |
The Farthing Wood animals celebrate in the lieu of Fox's victory, but a fully recovered Scarface makes a shocking return, vengefully killing Mrs Rabbit. Adder spies Scarface drinking at the pond, and then strikes the tyrant from beneath the water - Scarface only survives long enough to recognize his killer. Scarface's death marks the end of the feud, but Fox and his family have no time for celebration. Whisper has arrived at White Deer Park, but without Bold, who has hidden himself away, refusing to return to the park out of pride. When Fox and Vixen come to the fence in search of their son, Crow leads them to him just in time to say one last goodbye before he dies, Bold at last content with his father's approval. After Bold's death, Fox at last gives his blessing to Ranger and Charmer's union. Death of Mrs. Rabbit, Scarface and Bold. Ranger marries Charmer thanks to Fox's blessing.

=== Season 3 (1995) ===
All episodes were produced in 1995.

| No. overall | No. in series | Title | Original release date |
|---|---|---|---|
| 27 | 1 | "Comings and Goings" | 28 September 1995 |
During spring not very long since the death of Scarface, the Great White Stag goes to take a drink from a stream near the boundary. Many of the animals have had children and even grandchildren. Fox's grandson Plucky wanted a race with Dash. Weasel is going to have children which Weasel was not happy about. Whistler who was flying around White Deer Park sees the Great White Stag at the stream he was drinking from with his head nearly touching the water with his eyes closed and then he collapsed. Whistler realized that he perished from drinking and that the Stream was poisoned. He went and alerted Fox and the other animals. Fox had figured out that a bad tempered Deer named Trey would take his place. Owl had flown away to go look for a Mate. Meanwhile, a group of rats led by a big gray rat named Bully come scurrying through the fence and head towards the Great White Stag's dead body. Elsewhere, when Plucky and Dash take a drink at a pond, They get encountered by Trey and he tells them that it's his pond he will not let Non-Deer drink from it. The rats had been watching and they were about to capture Mossy until Measly scared them away. The Weasels had a great chase from Trey from that screaming who prevents screaming happening in White Deer Park. Weasel had decided for she and Measly to leave White Deer Park. Their departure is witnessed by Bully and his gang, who see this as the ultimate green light to take over the park. Meanwhile, Shadow the Badger arrives at White Deer Park with a mate named Hurkel and a male adder named Sinuous who mates with Adder and some voles arrive at the Park as well. Death of the White Stag. Introduction of Trey, Sinuous, Bully and his rats.
| 28 | 2 | "Out and About" | 5 October 1995 |
Owl leaves the park in search of a mate and the Weasel family have left to start a new life elsewhere. Plucky and Dash race again, while Trey harasses the other Farthing Wood animals. Meanwhile, Bully and his rats begin to build their numbers. Birth of Weasel and Measley's offspring Fido and Cleo.
| 29 | 3 | "Water, Water" | 12 October 1995 |
Water becomes an issue for the Animals of White Deer Park. Shadow and Hurkel arrive at the park only to see that the only water source Trey will allow the animals to drink from has been poisoned. That was the stream that the Great White Stag perished from. Meanwhile outside White Deer Park, Owl encounters a Rook named Moth eaten Rook who wants to talk to her, but Owl flies away with the Rook following her. Death of one of the rabbits
| 30 | 4 | "The Missing Fox's Friend" | 19 October 1995 |
While the numbers of Bully's rats continues to grow, so does the number of missing animals. When Dash sees Plucky being taken away in a cage to a truck, she decides to follow the truck only to be shut out of a mysterious human establishment surrounded by high walls and spike-top gates. Meanwhile, the Weasels to stay at a farm but the animals wouldn't let them stay. They gain a new Protector who is Rollo the Sheep Dog.
| 31 | 5 | "Tiffs and Tempers" | 26 October 1995 |
Weasel and Measley find a seemingly nice burrow for them to live when they discover it is being occupied by a pack of vicious wildcats. Their loyal "weasel dog" Rollo comes to their rescue. Meanwhile, Fox confronts Trey and tells him that he'll either come to hell or high water, Trey will respect the other animals of the park and he will step down as leader if one of the stags can fight against him for leadership. Also Ranger, Charmer, and Whisper confront Bully for the first time and he makes his intentions clear-to take over the entire park for himself and his rats. Charmer, Ranger and Whisper attack the rats that where aiding Bully, killing a few in the process, but Bully tells them that there are still hundreds of rats coming, as he escapes into a nearby pond. Death of Scrag, one of the rats.
| 32 | 6 | "Adventure for the Birds" | 2 November 1995 |
The weasel family are still looking for another home away from White Deer Park. While the rest of the Farthing animals are still trying to find out where the missing animals are. It is up to Whistler to solve it. He follows the truck to a walled-in nature reserve. When Plucky finds him, he tells him that the place is a new sanctuary. Although it's a nice place, many of the animals were separated from their families. Meanwhile Owl is still trying to escape the moth-eaten Rook, who says he loves her, but gets into trouble when she hides in a house.
| 33 | 7 | "The Long-Tailed Visitor" | 9 November 1995 |
The group of rats who first came to White Deer Park have advanced into a plague. Since first infiltrating the Farthing Wood animals, one of Bully's closest rats named Spike has befriended Toad and became his Matey. While the stags fight for leadership of the herd, Fox is visited by Bully and a group of his minions who try to threaten him to leave White Deer Park with the others. To ensure the park's safety, Fox orders an attack on the rats' headquarters, but the rat casualties was nothing compared to the ever growing population. Meanwhile Owl is awoken by the sound of a male owl who is also mateless. Meanwhile while the Weasels and Rollo have a nap Cleo and Fido jump in a dog bowl which flows down a river. However at a Bridge the Chief Wildcat from the episode Tiff's and Temper's prepares to bounce on the weasel pups but they were saved by Rollo and some Terrapins that took them back to shore. When Measly wanted to go back to White Deer Park and Weasel said "no", Rollo did and he became the Warden's Pet.
| 34 | 8 | "Scared Silly by Snakes" | 16 November 1995 |
Adder and Sinuous make their way into the rats' headquarters to try to kill Bully, but they end up frantically trying to escape as hundreds of rats chase after them. Plucky escapes the new sanctuary to return home and Owl ends up coated in cement that quickly sets. Meanwhile, Fido and Cleo make a new friend: a piglet who has named himself I'll Never Be Sausages. Death of Nat, one of the rats.
| 35 | 9 | "A Bigger Oink" | 23 November 1995 |
The animals in White Deer Park are still trying to deal with the army of rats and try to make the Warden aware of the problem. Meanwhile the weasels and the piglet come across a copse with a grumpy Wild Boar living there. Bully forms a task force of his biggest rats to hunt down and kill the snakes. They find Sinuous, thinking he is Adder and the biggest of them, an enormous town rat, kills him by strangling him. Hurkel and Shadow try to comfort Adder as Bully slinks away unnoticed. Death of Sinuous.
| 36 | 10 | "The Mole Game" | 30 November 1995 |
Toad and Spike invent a game called "The Mole Game". They have to guess where Mossy the Mole will come up. Ranger ends up winning when Charmer asks what Toad and Spike are doing, which quite makes his day. Adder has vowed to kill as many rats as she can to avenge her mate's death. Owl is still imprisoned in her Jacket of building cement, a few other fellow flappers (a robin, a green woodpecker, a rook, and another female owl) decide to try to break the cement by shoving her off the branch, but the plan fails, she is off the branch and still in the cement. Toad and Spike continue playing their game, but soon become surrounded by Bully and his rat army. Spike's cover is blown and Toad tries to escape, but ends up captured. Mossy has rushed to get help, only to find Dash. Dash goes and gets some White Deer to chase her, they stampede over the rats, squashing nearly every one. Spike feels terrible for his behavior, but is relieved when Toad is found alive at the pond, and Toad fully forgives him when Spike promises to fight like a Terrier the next time it happens. Spike was kicked out of the rat plague. Death of the Large Town Rat.
| 37 | 11 | "The Worst Kind of Hurricane" | 7 December 1995 |
As Mossy predicted, a hurricane come to the area around White Deer Park. The fierce winds knock over the last Farthing Wood beech tree and release Owl from her cement shell. After the hurricane ends, Rollo and the Warden find Shadow unconscious and take her to the cottage. Fox discovers Trey pinned under a tree. Another stag, Laird, comes to free Trey and readies to challenge him to a fight for leadership. Because of his injury, Trey reluctantly limps away abdicating his power to Laird. Afterwards, he is taken away by the Warden. Measley declares that he will take no more of Weasel's insults and decides to take their young ones back to White Deer Park. Weasel agrees wholeheartedly. Death of Wild Boar's wife
| 38 | 12 | "Homeward Bound" | 14 December 1995 |
When the weasels return home, all the animals are overrun with joy. Fox explains their problem with the rats to the weasels and asks for their help. They agree, but first they must train Fido and Cleo on how to deal with rats using Spike as a volunteer. Mossy tells Hurkel that he found Shadow in a hutch by the Warden's cottage. While Hurkel and the weasels try to get her out, the Warden's cat summons Rollo to get rid of them. Of course, he recognizes his weasel friends and is very happy to see them. Meanwhile, after a few fights for leadership of the herd, the white deer and Farthing animals name Laird as the new leader of White Deer Park. Elsewhere, the rats, at their largest number yet, prepare to launch a massive attack on the animals of the park. Departure of The Warden.
| 39 | 13 | "Bully-Bully-Bully" | 21 December 1995 |
Owl and Hollow return to White Deer Park just in time to overhear Bully addressing an assembly of his rats. She goes to gather the other animals and they plan to counterattack. Plucky sends Mossy to find Laird so he can send the white deer to stampede the rats. Despite their best efforts, the rats are still too numerous. There seems to be no chance of stopping them, until Cleo bites off Bully's tail. All the animals, including the rats begin to laugh at Bully and he skulks off back to the sewers where he came from with Brat. After the battle was won, the other rats apart from Spike, who remains at White Deer Park, also return to where they were before they came to the park and Fox calls an assembly to announce that he has decided to step down as leader of Farthing Land. He places Plucky in charge despite slight protest from Ranger. Trey returns to inform the animals that the Warden has merged White Deer Park with the new sanctuary to make one large wildlife preserve. He announces that with so much more space, he has decided to lose his brutish disposition, though he is still not fond of weasels. As Fox and Trey walk away together, Plucky decides that after a hard day's fighting, everyone should rest and explore the new addition to White Deer Park the next day.

== Home releases ==
The classic VHS titles of the series, released through BBC Video, were nine volumes in all, each amalgamating several episodes to form feature-length omnibuses. Because of time limitations on each cassette, some original episode sequences were cut out. Such scenes removed from the series on VHS titles, for example, included Fox's confrontation with the farmer's dog, and his conversation and 'employment' with the town cat, where he kills several mice. The swimming pool scene from the journey is also excluded.

=== DVD releases ===
Series 1 came out in France in February 2009.

In Germany, Series 1 was released on 25 September 2009, Series 2 on 27 May 2011, and Series 3 on 24 February 2012. The German DVD releases offer both English and German audio options.

Despite being a UK production, the whole series was not released on DVD in the UK until October 2016.

=== VHS releases ===
VHS titles were as follows:

- Vol. 1: "The Journey Begins"
- Vol. 2: "From Copse to Quarry"
- Vol. 3: "On to White Deer Park"
- Vol. 4: "The Challenge of Winter"
- Vol. 5: "Friends & Enemies"
- Vol. 6: "New Beginnings"
- Vol. 7: "New Dangers"
- Vol. 8: "The Rise of the Rats"
- Vol. 9: "The Wanderers' Return"

"New Beginnings" was the first TAOFW video title to receive a 'PG' certificate from the BBFC, largely due to the violent battles between Vixen & Lady Blue & Fox and Scarface and the strong emphasis on death, although generally the content was actually not much grimmer than that in earlier volumes.

In 1996, another tape was released entitled "Three Tales" that featured 'Toad's Tale', 'Badger's Tale' and 'The Foxes' Tale'. This was compiled from series 1 and 2.

Individual episodes were also available on VHS as part of a running promotion in Farthing Wood Friends magazine.
