= Paradise Grove =

- Directed by: Charles Harris
- Written by: Charles Harris
- Produced by: David Castro
- Starring: Ron Moody; Rula Lenska; Lee Blakemore; Leyland O'Brien
- Release date: 2003
- Running time: 93 minutes
- Country: United Kingdom
- Language: English

Paradise Grove is an independent 2003 black comedy filmed in London. Much of the film is based in a fictional Jewish retirement home. It stars Ron Moody and Rula Lenska. It was directed by Charles Harris and was his first feature film.

== Synopsis ==
Set in an eccentric north London Jewish old age home, the film revolves around three generations of the same family. The cantankerous Izzie Goldberg (Ron Moody), who's dying and is not at all happy about it, his hedonistic daughter Dee (Rula Lenska), the home's owner, a cross between a Sixties flower child and a traditional Jewish mother, and her teenage age son Keith (Leyland O'Brien), the mixed-race outcome of a disastrous marriage. Keith's identity crisis forms the film's emotional core: he's trying to build personal and religious bridges with his grandfather while starting a relationship with the mysterious Kim (Lee Blakemore), who turns up one morning looking for shelter, and who offers the promise of a life outside Paradise Grove. He wants to get away from his domineering mother.

== Reception ==
=== Reviews ===
"Sensitively moving between playful humour and serious drama..." Raindance Film Festival

"A jewel that will shine for years to come..." Notes From Hollywood

"Sharply observed and often hilarious..." London Jewish Chronicle

=== Accolades ===
The film garnered several awards and nominations;

- WINNER

BEST NEW DIRECTOR CHARLES HARRIS (Palm Springs Festival of Festivals)

- TOP FIVE

AUDIENCE FAVORITES (Palm Springs Festival of Festivals)

- WINNER

BRONZE AWARD FOR FIRST FILM (Houston WorldFest)

- TOP THREE

AUDIENCE FAVOURITES (Commonwealth Film Festival)

- NOMINATED

BEST FILM (British Independent Film Awards)
