= Tube Mice =

British children's TV animation (1988)

- Voices of: Sheila Hyde; Rupert Farley; George Cole; Dennis Waterman
- Country of origin: United Kingdom
- Original language: English
- No. of series: 1
- No. of episodes: 26

Production
- Production company: Honeycomb Animation for TSW

Original release
- Network: ITV (Children's ITV)
- Release: 5 September – 18 October 1988

Tube Mice is a British children's animated series for television produced in 1988 about the adventures of mice who dwell in the tunnels of the London Underground, the railway system locally referred to as 'the tube'. The real life mice themselves are often referred to as 'tube mice' by Londoners.

The series was created by Sara and Simon Bor at Honeycomb Animation for Television South West and was screened on Children's ITV. It later aired on Nickelodeon on cable television and on Tiny Pop on free to air satellite television. Tube Mice was also broadcast in several countries around the world such as SABC2 in South Africa, BFBS and SSVC Television in Germany, M1 in Hungary, Channel 5 in Singapore and TV One (as well as once on Channel 2) in New Zealand. It also features the voices of George Cole and Dennis Waterman of Minder fame.

== Overview ==
The four main characters were mice living at Oxford Circus Underground station. They use the Tube to get around London, taking them to wherever their latest adventure was supposed to take place.

The mice had their own society, using rubbish thrown away by humans (the mice had a strict code prohibiting theft). They had their own compartments on Underground trains and decorated their tunnels with reused junk. This society included mouse businessmen, mouse underground supervisors and even mouse Members of Parliament.

== Characters ==
The characters were all based on recognisable London "types". The main characters were:

- Bubble – A streetwise and confident female Rastafarian mouse, originally from a tower block. Voiced by Sheila Hyde.
- Squeak – An upper class fieldmouse who initially comes to London seeking his inheritance, but who decides to stay at Oxford Circus. His and Bubble's names are a pun on the English dish bubble and squeak. Voiced by Rupert Farley.
- Vernon – A wheeler-dealer of a mouse, dressed as a teddy boy. His greed and schemes would often form the basis of the adventure – often because he was rarely as clever as he thought he was. He was voiced by George Cole, and his character was remarkably similar to Arthur Daley, Cole's character in the popular television series Minder.
- Toaster – Vernon's dim-witted sidekick. He dressed like a punk. Although he would follow Vernon anywhere, his stupidity and love of food would often scupper any plans they had. He was voiced by Dennis Waterman, also enjoying success in Minder at the time. Geraldine and Adrian Powell’s beloved cat was named after this character.

Other characters included:

- Bo Heemy – A mouse artist. Her name is a pun on "bohemian"
- Mickelmouse – An MP at Westminster, sitting in the Mouse of Parliament.
- Rapper – A mouse who talks only in the form of rap.
- Derby – A mouse Underground attendant, usually found leaning on his broom, asleep.

== Episodes ==
- We Are the Tube Mice (05.09.1988)
- Escape from the 31st Floor (06.09.1988)
- The Riddle (07.09.1988)
- Break Out (08.09.1988)
- Mouses Of Parliament (12.09.1988)
- Take Away (13.09.1988)
- High Fliers (14.09.1988)
- Catastrophy (19.09.1988)
- Hank's in Town (20.09.1988)
- No Tea For Two (21.09.1988)
- Mice on Ice (22.09.1988)
- Tails From The Crypt (26.09.1988)
- The Last Post (27.09.1988)
- Phantoms of L'Opera (28.09.1988)
- Defective Detective (29.09.1988)
- Waxworks (03.10.1988)
- Art Show (04.10.1988)
- Grated Cheese Robbery (05.10.1988)
- Earthquake (06.10.1988)
- Best Kept Station (10.10.1988)
- Rap That Rat (11.10.1988)
- What a Difference a Day Makes (12.10.1988)
- Marathon Mice (13.10.1988)
- Library (17.10.1988)
- End of the Line (18.10.1988)

== Style ==
Unlike the later Underground Ernie, this series was set on a rather true-to-life version of the London Underground, right down to litter and graffiti.

The style of animation was very distinctive, using strange angles and perspectives, and using watercolour backgrounds. The series made heavy use of the ransom note effect where writing appeared on screen, giving the series a very punk feel.

== Transmission guide ==
- Series 1: 26 editions from 5 September 1988 – 18 October 1988
