= The Animals of Farthing Wood (TV series) =

British-French television series

- Genre: Adventure; Drama
- Created by: Colin Dann (original books)
- Written by: Sue Butterworth; Alan Case; Valerie Georgeson; Gordon Harrison; Elphin Lloyd-Jones; Jenny McDade; Steve Walker
- Directed by: Philippe LeClerc; Elphin Lloyd-Jones
- Voices of: Jeremy Barrett; Rupert Farley; Jon Glover; Sally Grace; Stacy Jefferson; Pamela Keevilkral; Ron Moody
- Theme music composer: Detlev Kühne
- Composer: Detlev Kühne
- Countries of origin: United Kingdom; France
- Original language: English
- No. of series: 3
- No. of episodes: 39 (list of episodes)

Production
- Executive producers: Theresa Plummer-Andrews (for BBC); Enrico Platter (for WDR, Series 1–2); Siegmund Grewenig (for WDR, Series 3)
- Producer: John M. Mills
- Running time: 24 minutes
- Production companies: Telemagination; La Fabrique

Original release
- Network: BBC One (Children's BBC)
- Release: 6 January 1993 – 21 December 1995

The Animals of Farthing Wood is a British animated series commissioned by the European Broadcasting Union between 1993 and 1995, and is based on the series of books written by English author Colin Dann. It was produced from 1992 to 1995 by Telemagination, based in London, and La Fabrique, based in Montpellier in France, but also aired in other European countries. The first countries to air the series were Norway, Germany, Finland, The Netherlands, Belgium, Ireland, Italy, and the United Kingdom, in January 1993.

== Synopsis ==
The television series followed the basic plots of the series of books, although certain elements were changed.

The first series followed the animals of Farthing Wood, who were forced to flee their homes after humans started destroying the wood to build suburban tract houses. Led by Fox, and guided by Toad, the animals left Farthing Wood on a journey to White Deer Park, a nature reserve where they would be protected. The second and third series followed the relationships between the Farthing Wood animals, the White Deer Park animals and outsiders, particularly a blue fox named Scarface, his mate Lady Blue and cub Ranger.

The episodes were made in both the UK and France. Because of this, in Series 1 traffic is seen driving on the right hand carriageway of the motorway, but they are briefly seen in Series 3 driving on the left hand side. Other than this, the location is generally kept ambiguous, apart from a brief moment in Series 2 when a gravestone is visible with French writing on it.

When the series aired in the United States, two versions were shown: the UK version which was shown on select television stations, and a new version released on home video titled Journey Home: The Animals of Farthing Wood. The home video version saw some of the voices changed, for example, the role of Fox was replaced by Ralph Macchio, along with added songs as well.

== Episodes ==
Series	Episodes	Originally released	
Series	Episodes	First released	Last released
1	13	6 January 1993	31 March 1993
2	13	29 September 1994	22 December 1994
3	13	28 September 1995	21 December 1995

== Cast ==
- Jeremy Barrett as Mole, Mr. Rabbit, Mr. Shrew, Measley, Warden's Cat, Bold, Friendly, Hollow, Mossy, Hurkel and others.
- Rupert Farley as Fox, Mr. Hare, Mr. Pheasant, Plucky, Trey, Fido and others.
- Jon Glover as Scarface, Ranger, Crow, Warden, Brat and others.
- Sally Grace as Weasel, Owl, Mrs. Vole, Mrs. Pheasant and others.
- Stacy Jefferson as Vixen, Adder, Kestrel, Mrs. Hare, Mrs. Rabbit, Whisper, Shadow and others.
- Pamela Keevilkral as Dash, Cleo, Speedy, Mrs. Squirrel, Mrs. Hedgehog and others.
- Ron Moody as Badger, Toad, Whistler, Bully, Spike, Rollo, Mr. Hedgehog, Mr. Vole, Mr. Fieldmouse, The Great White Stag, and others.
- Maria Warburg as Whisper (Audiobook only)
- Peter Woodthorpe as Whistler, Toad, and The Great White Stag (Audiobook only)
- Timothy Bateson as Measley, Fox, Trey, and others (Audiobook only)
- Fiona Reid as Weasel and Adder (US dub only)

Fox, the leader of the Animals of Farthing Wood, was voiced by Rupert Farley in the UK and Ireland version, but in the US home video version, he was played by Ralph Macchio.

== Release ==
In October 2016, Network Distributing released all three series of The Animals of Farthing Wood onto a DVD box set. This was the first time that all episodes had been released in English as an official and complete set. As of 2021, the series is available for digital purchase in HD format in the UK on Amazon Prime Video.

A complementary series called Buzz Books was also released, based upon the characters in the television series with a few changes. Episode stories were abridged for Buzz Books, Reed Children's Books' range of storybooks based on popular children's characters. The Farthing Wood stories in this range started with five books to begin with, then steadily expanded to cover the remainder of series one and series two. Illustrations were produced by William Heinemann

Adventures of Fox appears last on The Greatest BBC Children's Video Ever, containing clips from a few episodes.

Despite the show being very popular, the series did not see any form of DVD release until 2009, with the episodes on VHS hard to find up to then (in particular the last two collections). However, there had been an increase in unofficial DVDs available on eBay.

Series 1 came out in France in February 2009.

In Germany, Series 1 was released on 25 September 2009, Series 2 on 27 May 2011, and Series 3 on 24 February 2012. The German DVD releases offer both English and German audio options.

In October 2016, Network released all three series of The Animals of Farthing Wood onto a DVD box set. This is the first time all episodes have been released in English as an official and complete set. Brownee Bear Productions also own the licence for this show. The licence was done through agreements of the creators.

=== Merchandise ===
Apart from books and videos, there was also a Farthing Wood CD-ROM game that was released in October 1996, and in the mid-1990s, a 130-part magazine for children entitled "Farthing Wood Friends" was also developed. Audio tapes recapping the first two seasons were released, with the story being told to young fox cubs by several of the cast who would also debate the events and mimic some of the other characters.

There are also three TV tie-in books available, one to accompany each of the TV series. The Animals of Farthing Wood links with Series 1, The Further Adventures of The Animals of Farthing Wood links with Series 2, and The Animals of Farthing Wood – Spirit of Survival links with Series 3.

Watered-down versions of episode storylines were also featured as a running story in Farthing Wood Friends, illustrated using photographic stills from the series. Between magazine coverages of second and third series episodes, abridgements of Colin Dann's original stories were used to fill the void, entitled Tales From Farthing Wood. Another book adaptation of the running story employed for series one was released by Ted Smart Publishing, with illustrations by Stuart Trotter.

Hornby produced collectible figurines of the series ensemble, released in batches or 'presentation packs'.

The characters were also released in twin packs and later in the run, Hornby produced compatible play-scenes. Early in the run, almost simultaneous with the first series being shown in the UK, they released plush toys of Badger, Fox and Mole. Although these were rare finds in toyshops, they were the subject of a running promotion in Farthing Wood Friends, enabling readers to win them.
