= Rupert Farley =

British actor

- Born: Rupert Charles Farley; 4 August 1957 (age 69); Holborn, London, England
- Occupation: Actor
- Years active: 1983–present

Rupert Charles Farley (born 4 August 1957) is an English actor. He has had various roles in movies such as From Hell, The Young Poisoner's Handbook, Shakespeare in Love and Mrs Brown. He is probably best known for his voice acting work, which includes voice over work for television advertisements and animation. He is well known through voice work of Tube Mice, some of Bernard Cornwall's Sharpe Novels, The Animals of Farthing Wood television series; he voiced several characters, including Fox, Plucky, Trey, Brat and Mr. Pheasant.
