= Sikorski's tourists =

Second Polish Republic and its borders. Borders used by "Sikorski's tourists" included the Lithuanian to the north-east, and Romanian to the south-east.

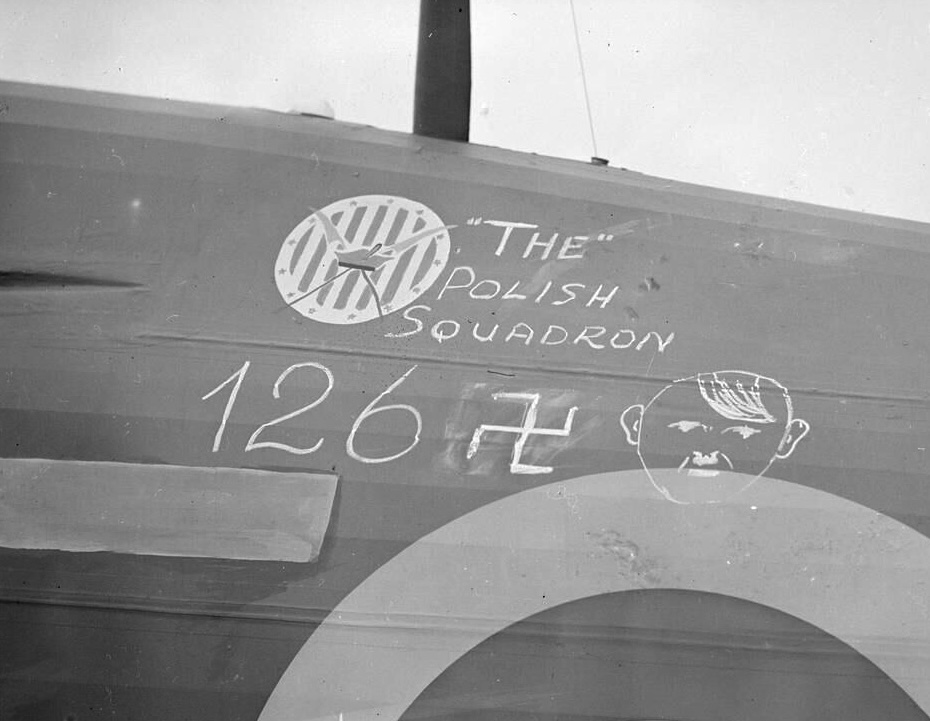
Painting on a Hurricane of the No. 303 "Kościuszko" Polish Fighter Squadron, a Polish squadron fighting during the Battle of Britain, indicating 126 claimed air-to-air kills shot down by the Squadron, some of Sikorski's tourists.

Sikorski's tourists (Polish: turyści Sikorskiego) refers to the thousands of Poles who escaped occupied Poland, following the country's defeat in September 1939, and found their way to France and the United Kingdom, to enlist in the re-formed Polish Army under the Western Allies.

== Term origins ==
The term "Sikorski's tourists" was originally coined by German propaganda. Later on, the term was used by others such as British King George VI and the Poles themselves. Władysław Sikorski was the commander in chief of the Polish Armed Forces in the West. The tourism part refers to the fact that to join Sikorski's new force in France, the volunteers couldn't take the direct route (through Germany), and instead had to embark on long trips through neutral countries, usually in the Balkans and then around the Mediterranean basin.

A book Turyści Sikorskiego: dalsze dzieje Jurija Dąbskiego by Alfons Jacewicz was published in London in 1965.

== Numbers and routes ==
It is estimated that about 200,000 able bodied Polish men escaped the country before it was occupied by Nazi Germany in late September 1939, following the defeat of Poland. There were two major escape routes, each involving one of the two neutral states neighboring the Second Polish Republic, Lithuania and Romania. The first was northeast to Lithuania, then west over the Baltic Sea. The second route was southeast, crossing the Polish border into Romania. That southern route usually crossed the Mediterranean, departing from various Balkan ports, but some Poles travelled through Middle Eastern countries such as Syria or Lebanon, and others took an overland route through Italy. A small number of Poles were interned in Latvia, some of them transferred later to Lithuania or Sweden.

While many were initially interned in the neutral countries, they found it was not difficult to escape the internment.

After the occupation of Poland, a popular escape route took volunteers more directly south through the Tatra Mountains in Slovakia, then crossing to Romania or Hungary.

Over the next few months, those individuals would find their way to territories controlled by the Western Allies, primarily France, where they would enlist in the reformed Polish Army.

The term has been also used for the soldiers of the Polish II Corps, formed from Polish volunteers in Russia in 1941, and transferred to the Western Allies' command shortly afterward; that unit saw action in the Middle East, Africa and Europe.

== See also ==
- Orzeł incident
- Romanian bridgehead
