= Colin Dann =

English author (born 1943)

- Born: 10 March 1943 (age 83); Richmond, Surrey, England
- Writing career
- Notable work: The Animals of Farthing Wood

Colin Dann (born 10 March 1943) is an English author. He is best known for his The Animals of Farthing Wood series of books, which was subsequently made into an animated series.

Dann worked at the publishing firm William Collins, Sons & Co. for thirteen years, and his first novel, The Animals of Farthing Wood, was written during this period. The original cover for this and a dozen others was painted by Portal artist Frances Broomfield.

== Books ==
Farthing Wood series

- The Animals of Farthing Wood (1979)
- In the Grip of Winter (1981)
- Fox's Feud (1982)
- The Fox Cub Bold (1983)
- The Siege of White Deer Park (1985)
- In the Path of the Storm (1989)
- Battle for the Park (1992)
- Farthing Wood - The Adventure Begins (1994)

King of the Vagabonds series

- King of the Vagabonds (1987)
- The City Cats (1992)
- Copycat (1997)

Other books

- The Ram of Sweetriver (1986)
- The Beach Dogs (1988)
- Just Nuffin (1990)
- A Great Escape (1990)
- Legacy of Ghosts (1991)
- Nobody's Dog (1999)

The Lions of Lingmere series

- Journey to Freedom (1999)
- Lion Country (2000)
- Pride of the Plains (2002)
