= Sobański =

Polish noble family

The Sobański, plural: Sobańscy, feminine form: Sobańska is a Polish noble family. The family originated from Masovia, taking their name from the village Sobania and Sobanice in the land of Wyszogród and Ciechanów. Connected with the families Bieliński, Łubieński, Jełowicki, Borukowski and Gostkowski.

== History ==
In the 15th century the Sobański family split into two lines: the "Ciechanowska" (older line) and "Wyszogrodzka" (younger line), the latter one used the nickname Ścibor. One branch of the Ścibor-Sobański settled in Pomerania, another one in Volhynia and Podolia. In 1880 Feliks Sobański from Podolia, founder of the "Masovian line" of the family, received the hereditary title of Count from Pope Leo XIII.

== Notable family members ==
- Antoni Sobański
- Feliks Sobański
- Jarosław Marek Sobański
- Małgorzata Sobańska
- Remigiusz Sobański
- Stanisław Sobański
- Teodor Sobański

== Coat of arms ==
The Sobański family used the Junosza coat of arms.

== Palaces ==
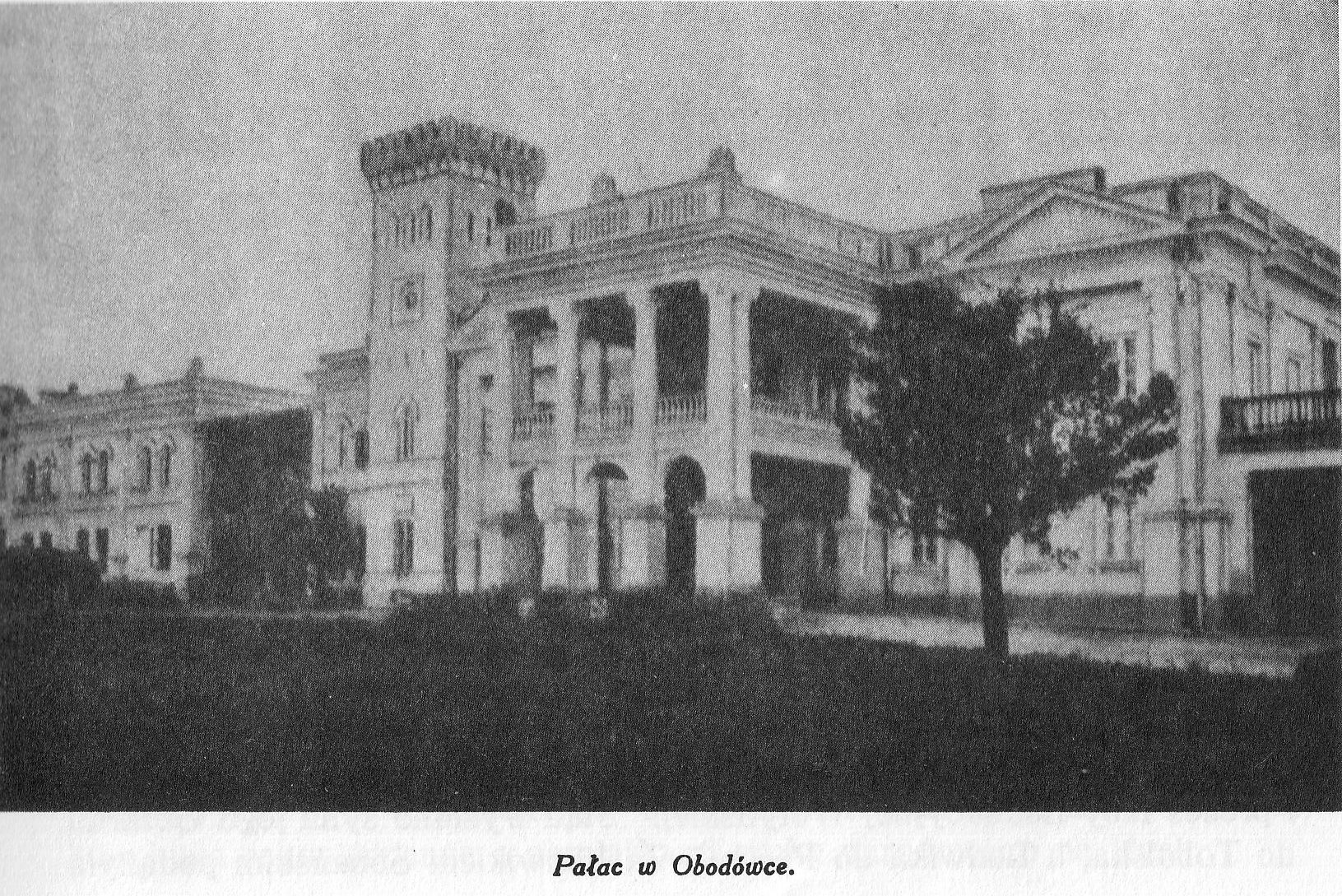
Sobański Palace in Obodówka (presently in Ukraine)

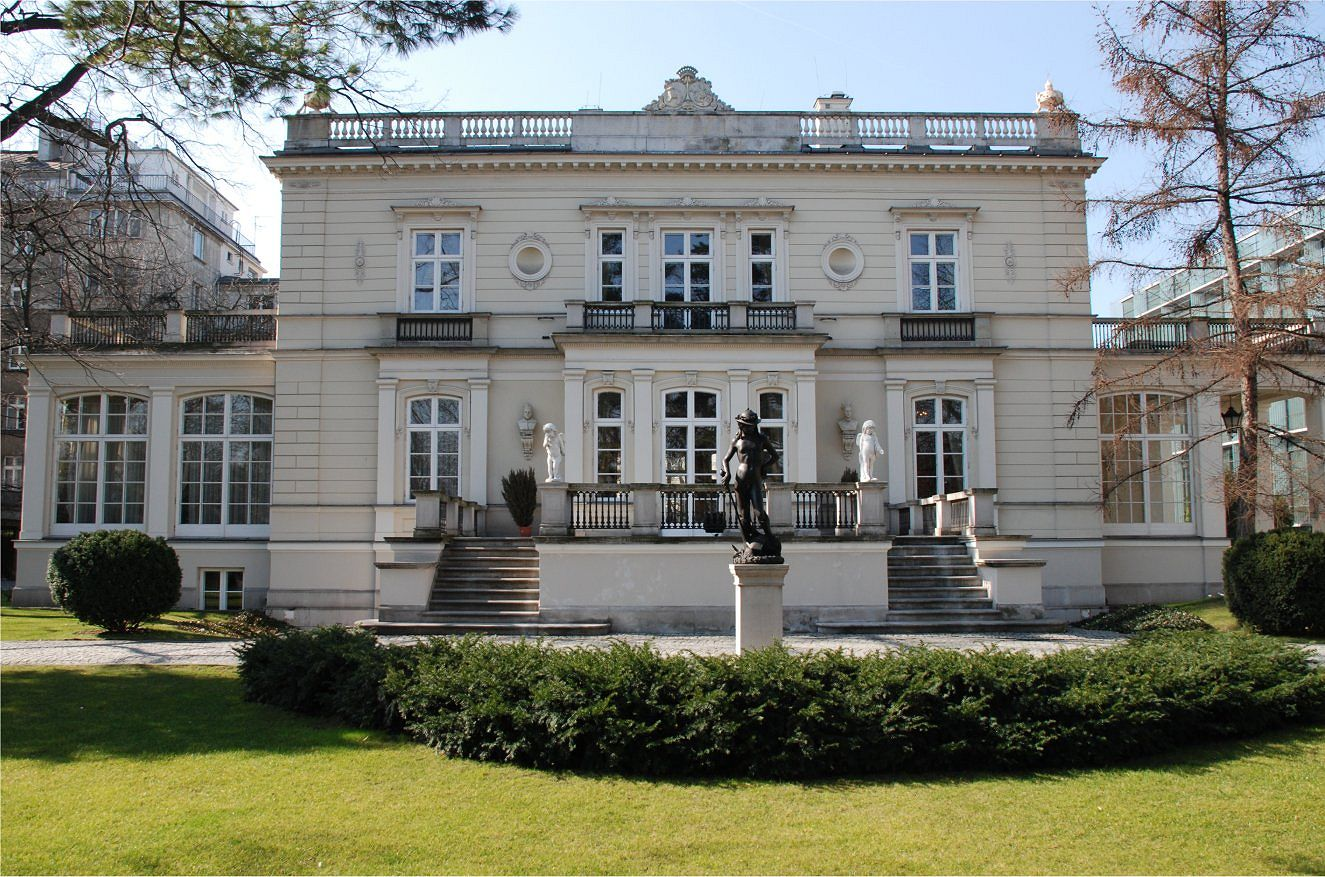
Sobański Palace in Warsaw

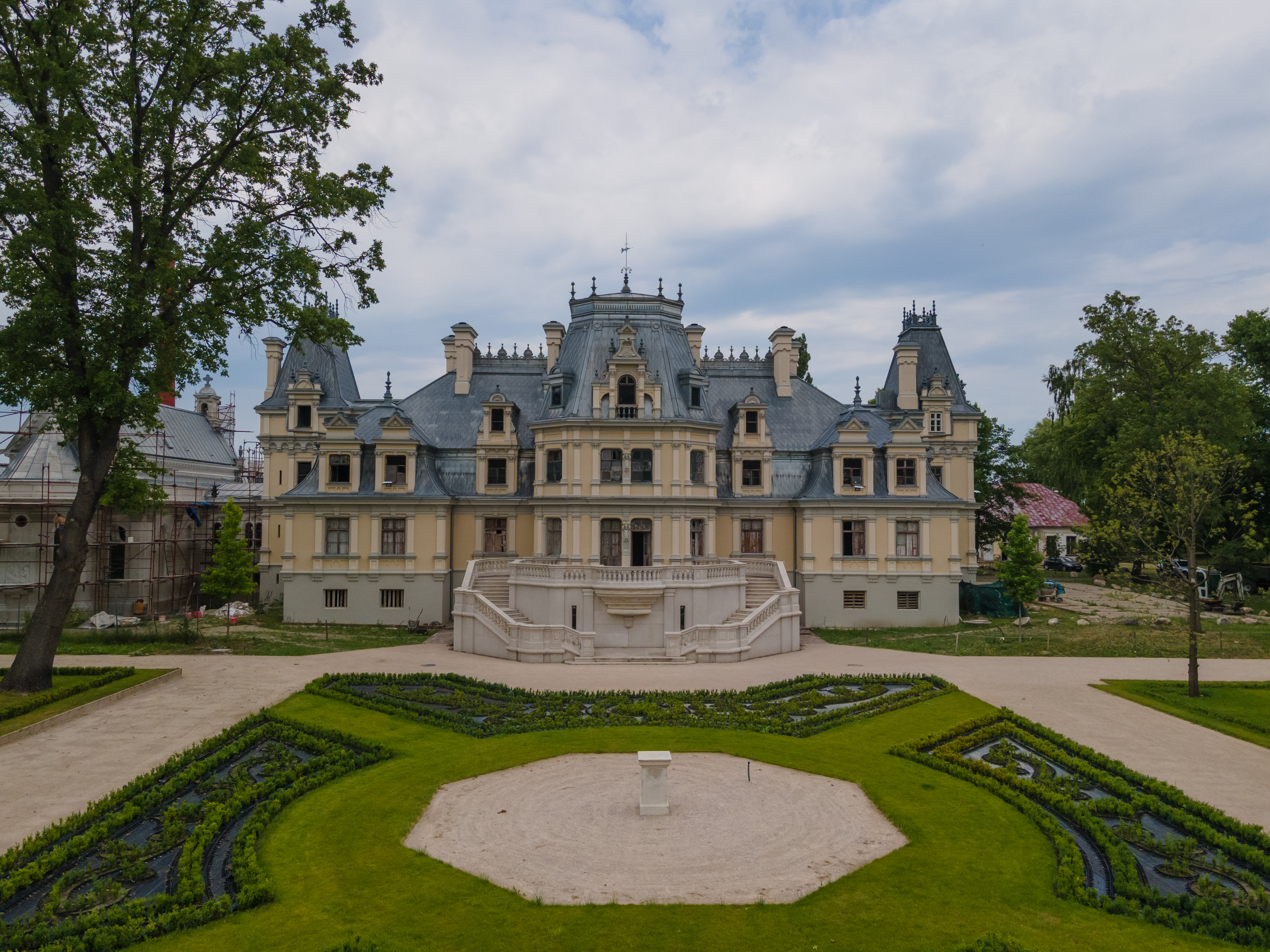
Sobański Palace in Guzów

== Bibliography ==
- Maria z Grocholskich Hieronimowa Sobańska: "Wspominki nikłe". Grodzisk Mazowiecki, Primum 2002
- Polski Słownik Biograficzny, tom XXXIX, Instytut Historii PAN, Warszawa-Kraków 1999–2000
- "Drzewo Genealogiczne 64 herbowe po mieczu i kądzieli Sobańskich, Jałowieckich, Drohojowskich wydane w 200 numerowanych egzemplarzach jako rękopis, w Warszawie, Nakładem Rodziny", 8.02.1912
