= Guzów, Żyrardów County =

Guzów
- Village
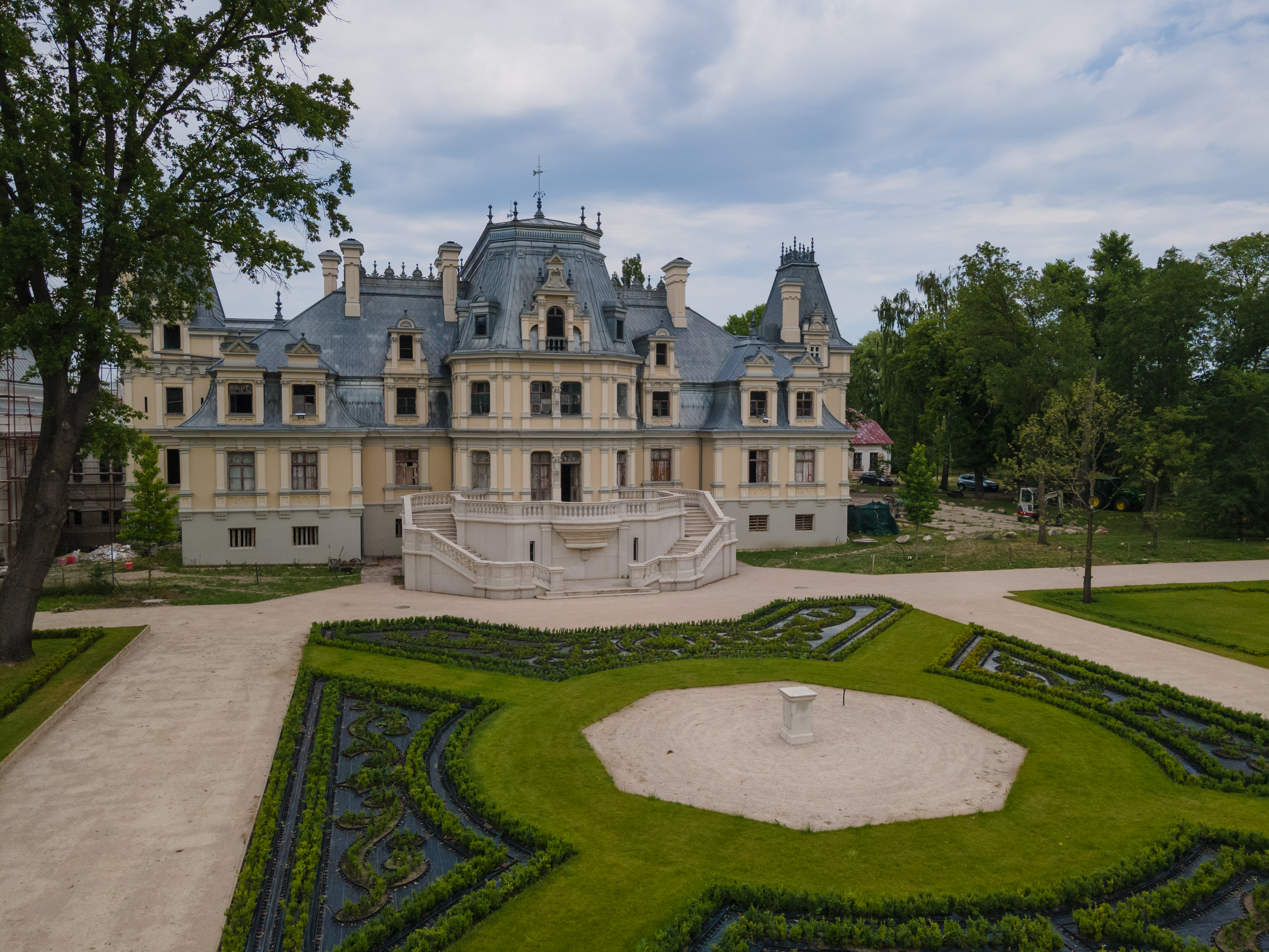
- Sobański Palace in Guzów under renovation

- Location within Poland
- Coordinates: 52°6′58″N 20°20′13″E
- Country: Poland
- Voivodeship: Masovian
- County: Żyrardów
- Gmina: Wiskitki

Guzów [ˈɡuzuf] is a village in the administrative district of Gmina Wiskitki, within Żyrardów County, Masovian Voivodeship, in east-central Poland. It is approximately 6 km (4 mi) north-west of Wiskitki, 10 km (6 mi) north-west of Żyrardów, and 47 km (29 mi) west of Warsaw. It is the birthplace of statesman and composer, Michal Kleofas Oginski (1765-1833).

== History ==
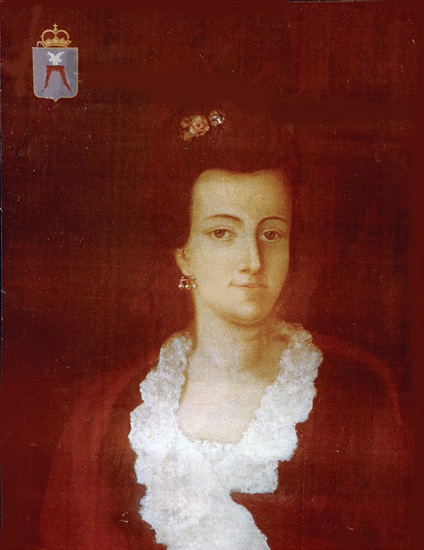
Paula Szembek Ogińska, for forty years starościna of Guzów

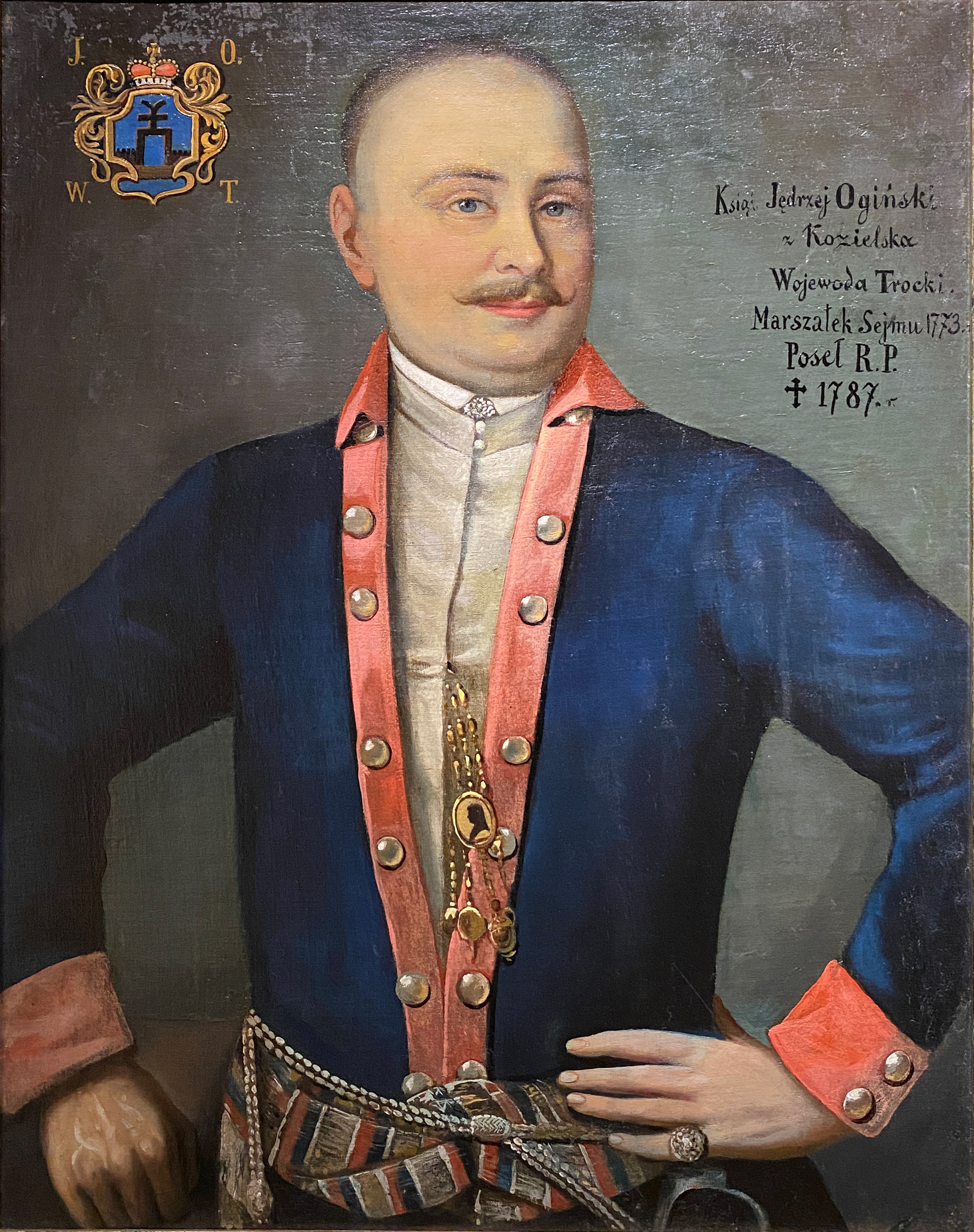
Andrzej Ogiński, builder of Guzów Manor c.1765

In the late Middle Ages the lands of Guzów were a ducal estate owned by Siemowit IV, Duke of Masovia. In the 17th century the settlement was promoted in importance to a rural bailiwick in the possession of Lukasz Opalinski (1612-1666), Grand Marshal of the Crown. After Opalinski the estate changed hands frequently until the early 18th century when the vast 6,000 hectare property came into the Potocki family. Jan Prosper Potocki, starosta of Guzów was briefly the second husband of Paula Szembek, for he died early. She became 'starościna' and brought the immense estate with her in her dowry when she married thirdly the highly influential politician and courtier, Andrzej Ogiński. He is credited with introducing stability to the place by erecting an extensive late baroque manorial complex, of which only one 1855 print survives. It comprised an Orangery, an Italian garden and a theatre. Here were born his daughter, Józefa and son, Michał Kleofas Ogiński, insurrectionist, statesman and composer. His life was too much caught up in the political turmoil of the country to be focused on the estate. He emigrated.

=== Sugar and cloth give birth to a 'New Town' ===
After the third partition of Poland in 1795, the estate became the possession of its Prussian conquerors. Strictly, it came under the Prussian kingdom's Treasury, but it was in the gift of Frederick William II of Prussia who passed it to his loyal minister, Karl Georg von Hoym. Being based in Silesia, it was an 'inconvenient' gift and he was minded to sell it back to its erstwhile owner, Ogiński's widow, Paula. At this point, her first-born son and jurist Feliks Łubieński, stepped in with a cunning plan. Having already successfully entertained the Prussian king at his Szczytniki estate, he obtained royal backing to swap that estate, together with his other properties at Kalinowa, Sieradz County, for Guzów. This arrangement proved acceptable to the Prussian minister and Łubieński thus wrested control of his mother's former estate without any money having to be exchanged. Meanwhile, in 1797, a new Prussian king ascended the throne and during a tour of his territories, Łubieński and his writer wife, Tekla Teresa, entertained Frederick William III of Prussia and his wife to breakfast. The visit was deemed such a success that it led to the king bestowing upon him the Prussian title of count. The estate became a favourite retreat from Warsaw for the Lubieńskis and their family of ten children, which they used for theatrical productions and country pursuits.

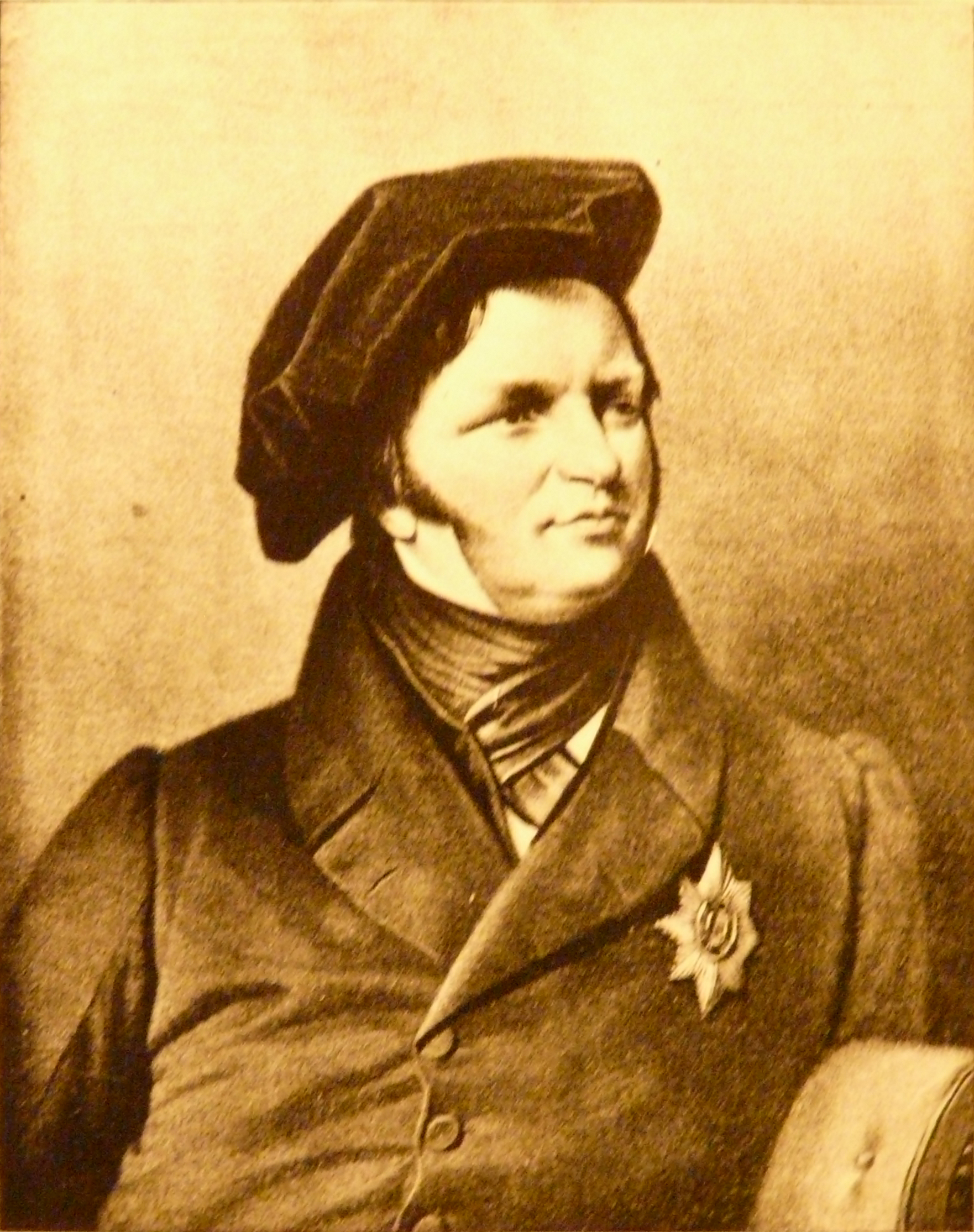
Henryk Łubieński, industrialist, banker and head of the Łubieński Brothers Co.

In 1827 the widowed Lubieński (his wife had died in 1810), now retired from public office, put his energies into the estate. Among other developments, he established 15 new villages. However, his arguably most productive, if doomed, move was to pass the estate onto one of his seven sons, Henryk, an entrepreneur and industrialist, who had greatly contributed to the economic development of Congress Poland. Lubieński senior donated Ruda Guzowska, part of the estate, specifically for the creation in 1833 of a state-of-the-art textile factory, with machinery imported from France along with its inventor, Philippe de Girard. It quickly overtook Guzów in importance as a gmina and eventually became the thriving mill town of Żyrardów.

In 1829 Henryk had also established in the vicinity of the manor one of the first sugar factories in the country, with the help of imported machinery from France. However, in 1842 Henryk, by then also a bank director, was accused and convicted of 'misapplying' public funds for his private benefit. He was sent into exile and the estate was confiscated to recover his debts. There is a view that the charges were politically motivated and not based in fact. He returned from detention a broken man and took no further part in public life.

=== Still in the family ===
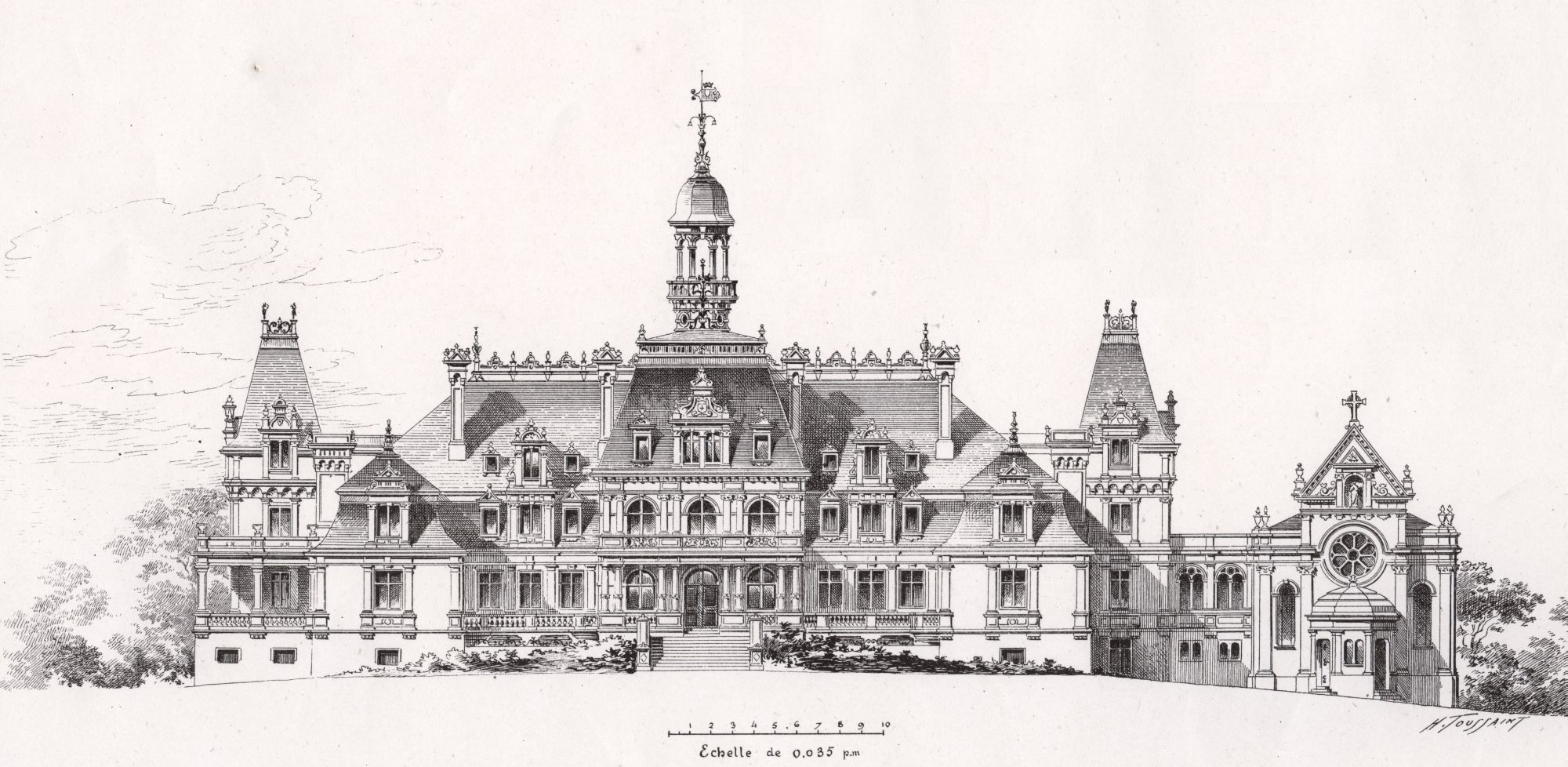
1880 architectural proposal for Sobański Palace

In 1856 the whole Guzów estate was put up for auction. In the event, it was acquired for the enormous sum of 600,000 silver roubles by Feliks Sobański, the son of a magnate from Podolia. Sobański also happened to be a grandson of Feliks Łubieński through his mother, Róża, and from 1857, married to another Łubieńska, Emilia. He set about rebuilding the manor house, fashioning it into a French Renaissance style palace with a park in the manner of Capability Brown.

The gradually reduced Guzów estate remained in the possession of the Sobański family into two World wars, when the palace served as a military hospital. At the start of World War II it was still the property of Antoni Sobański, a wartime writer and journalist with the BBC Polish Section. However, in 1944, it became subject to a land reform and taken over by the Nazi occupiers of Poland. After the Second World War the estate, as all other country estates, was nationalised. Antoni Sobański never returned to his homeland and died in London.

== The palace and the landscape garden complex ==
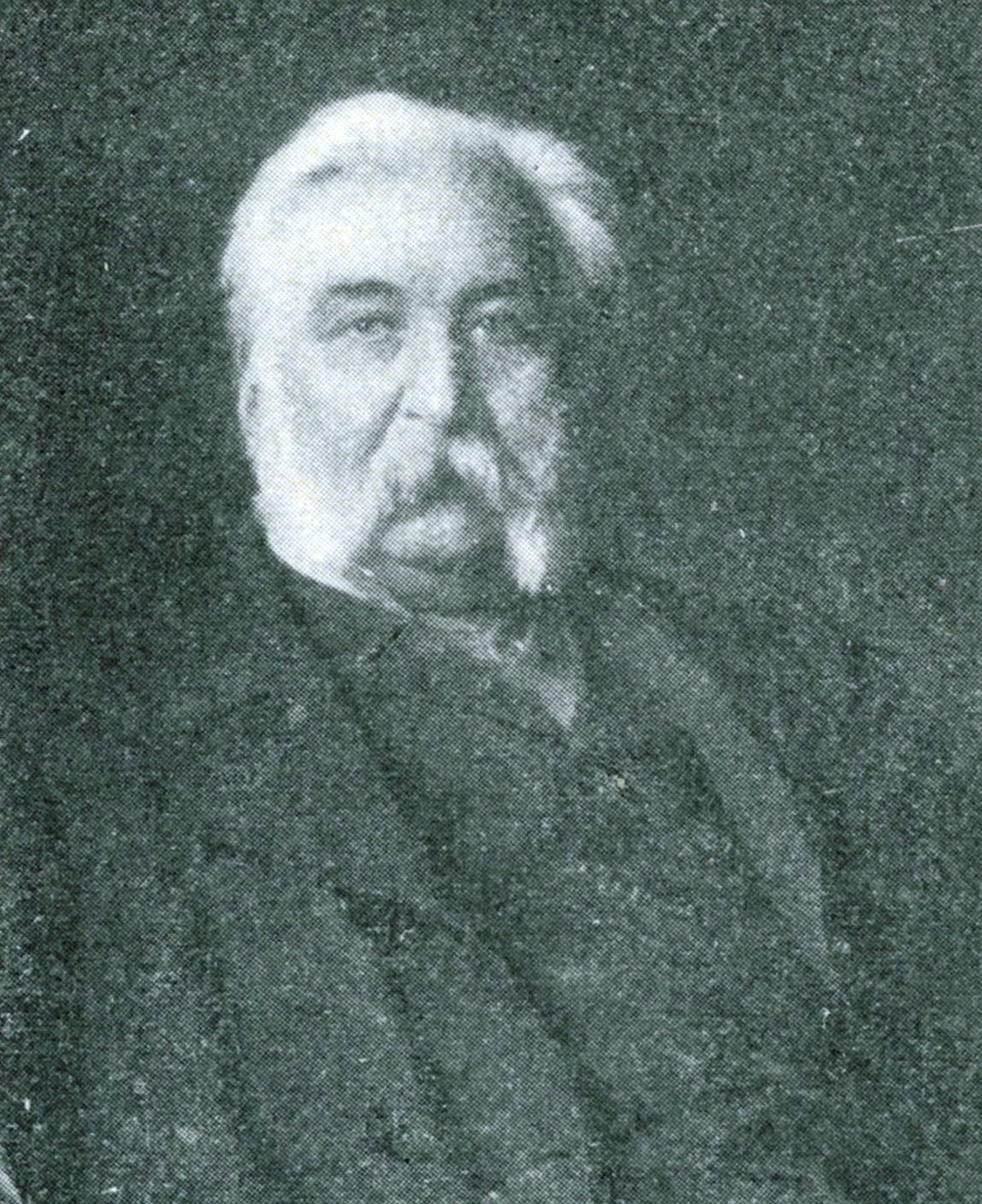
Count Feliks Hilary Sobański in the early 1900s

Andrzej Ogiński's 18th-century substantial brick manor house gave way in the next century to a 19th-century confection. The then owner, Feliks Sobański, commissioned Polish architect Władysław Hirschel to recreate a property reminiscent of French Loire Valley castles. The landscape architects Walerian Kronenberg and Franciszek Szanio became the designers of a park and gardens in the 'English style'.

After its use as a military hospital for the nearby front-line, the palace and the grounds were severely damaged. In the interwar period there was some renovation but during the Second World War the palace interior and furnishings were again plundered. After the war the palace was used as quarters for the employees of the local sugar factory. In 1996 the Sobański family succeeded in having the palace complex restituted to it, albeit as a virtual ruin. After many years of neglect the property was in need of complete restoration, as were the grounds.

The first building to be refurbished was the old palace chapel, dedicated to St. Felix of Valois and used as a parish church. With help from public heritage funds and hiring out the venue as a film set, work on the restoration is finally under way guided by a firm of specialist architects.

== Trivia ==
In its pre-1880 French-style reconstruction, the Łubieński 18th-century manor at Guzów is said to have been the inspiration for Stanisław Moniuszko's famous opera, The Haunted Manor - Straszny Dwór - 1865. Vying for the opera's original setting, is another former Łubieński manor, given up by the family in 1797, at Kalinowa, but circumstantially it seems less likely. Subsequently, Feliks Hilary Sobański was a member of the 'Moniuszko' music society in Warsaw.

== Gallery ==
=== Figures associated with Guzów ===
Łukasz Opaliński - print

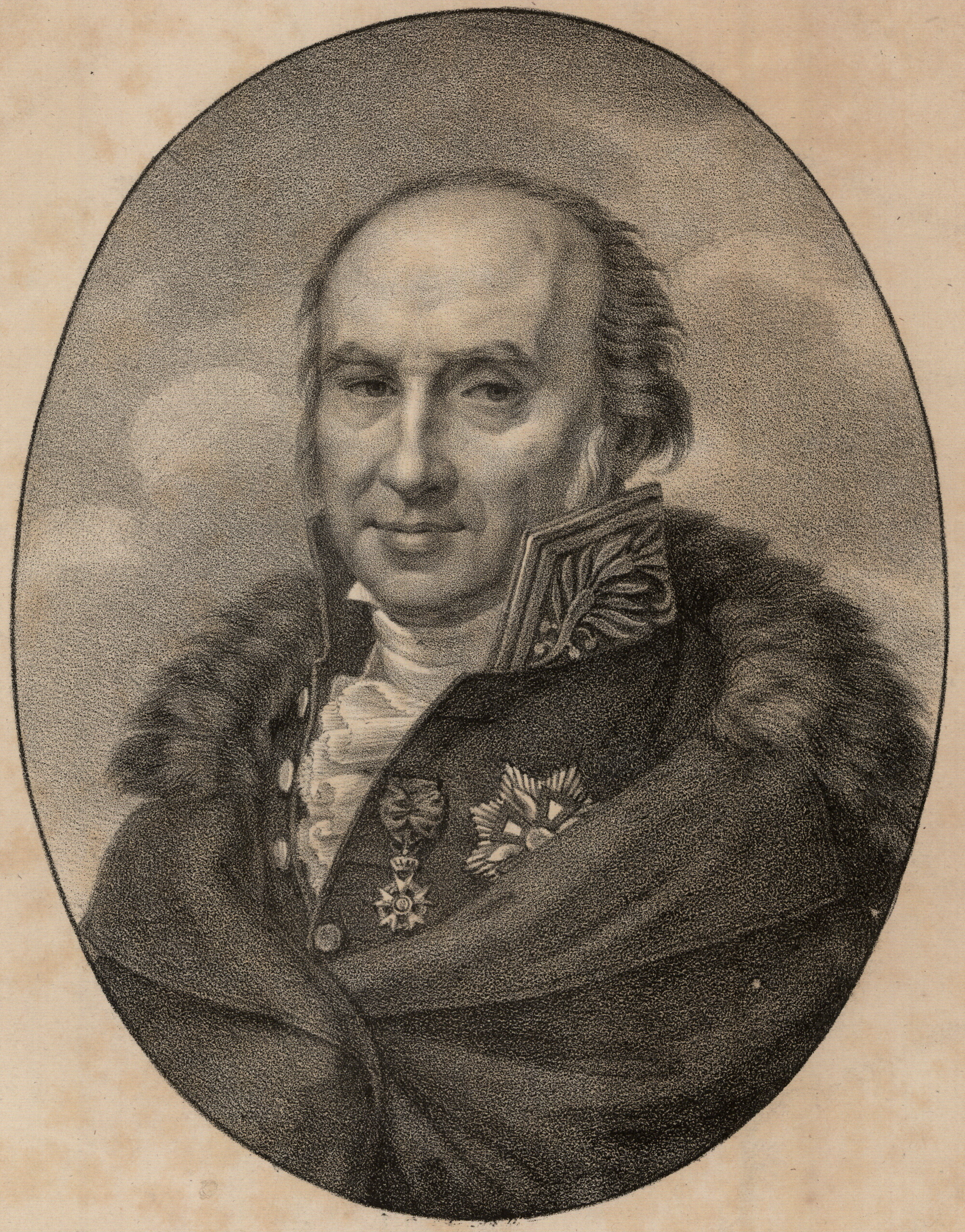
Feliks Łubieński - lithography by Józef Sonntag

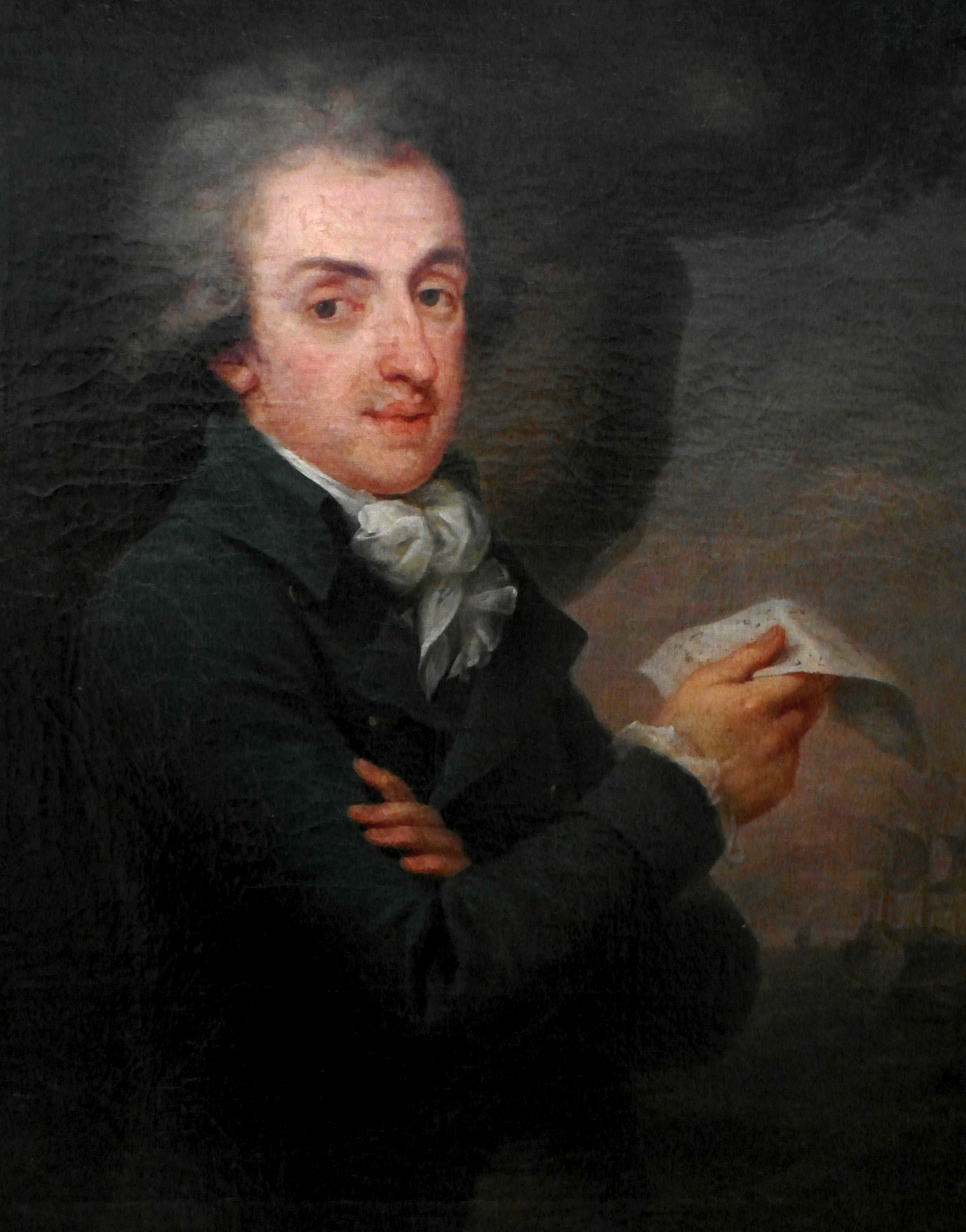
Prot Potocki - oil by Giuseppe Grassi

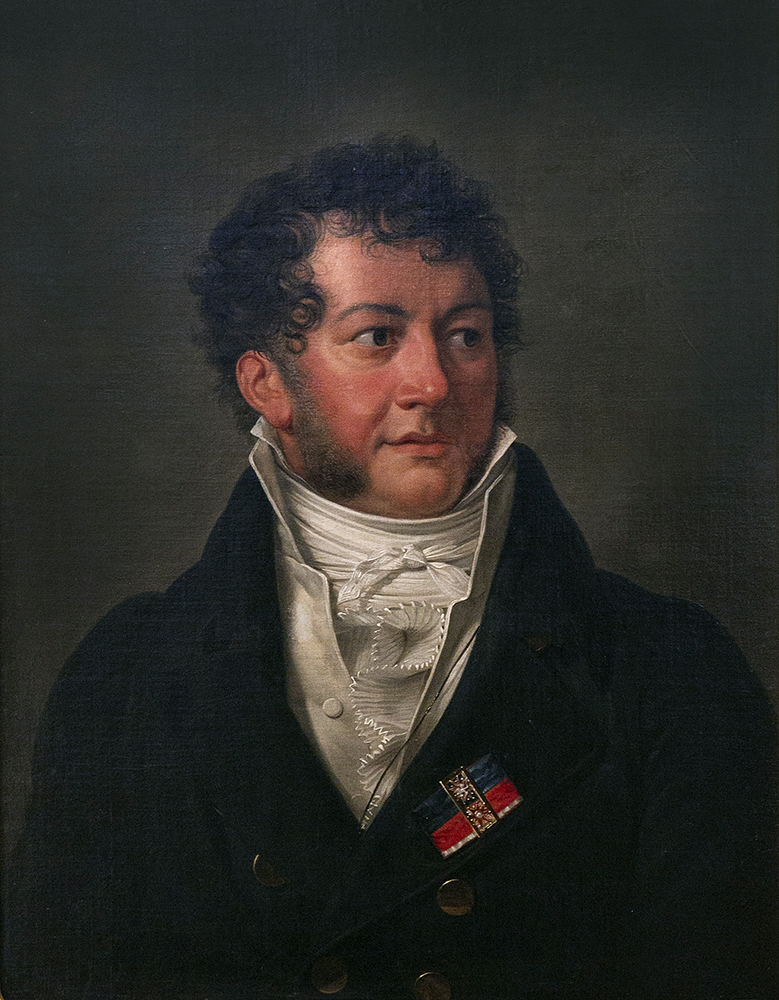
Michał Kleofas Ogiński - oil by François-Xavier Fabre

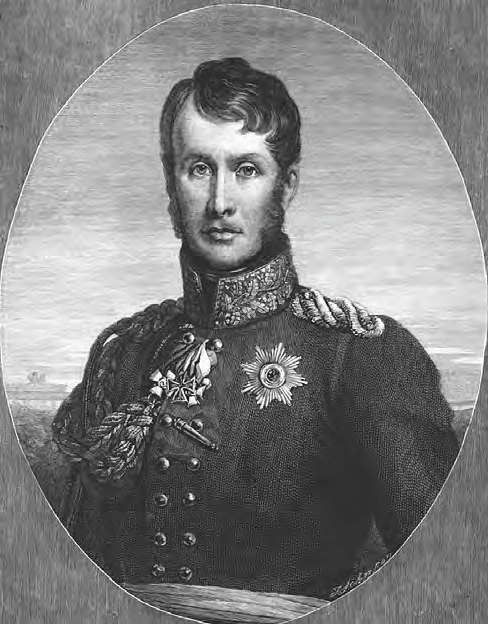
Frederick William III of Prussia - helped the estate return to the family

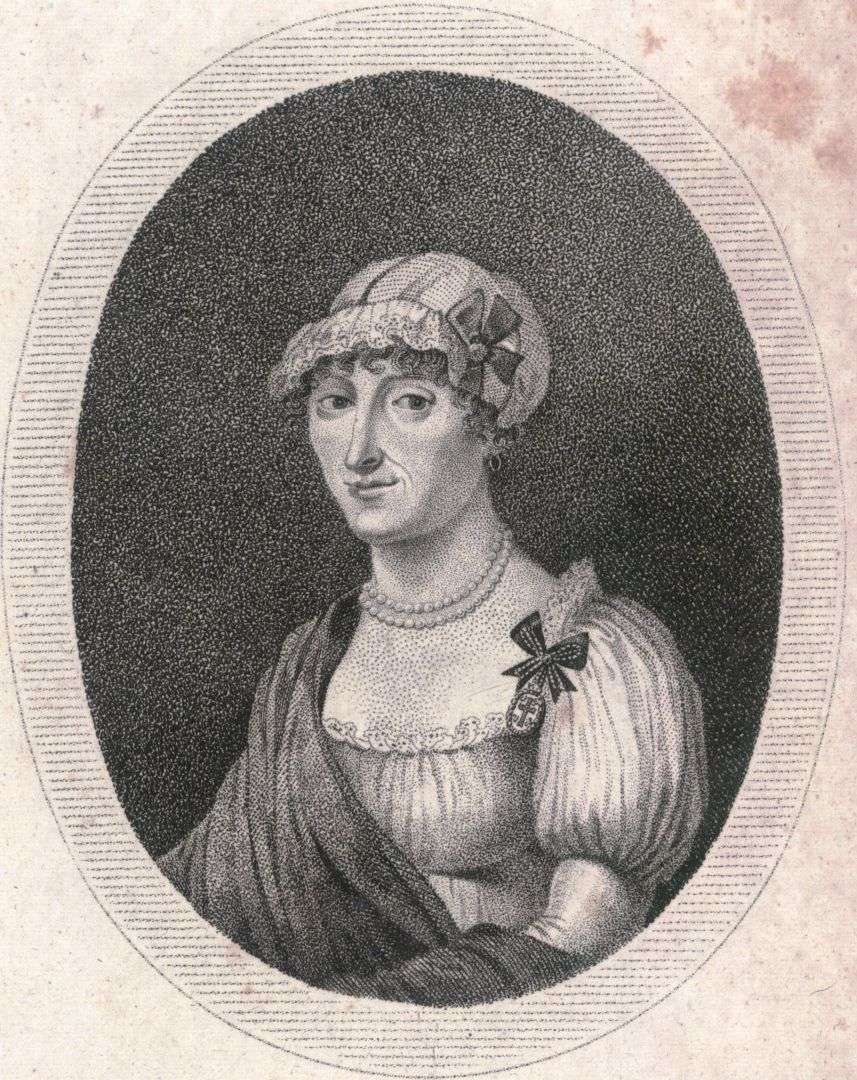
Tekla Teresa Łubieńska - print

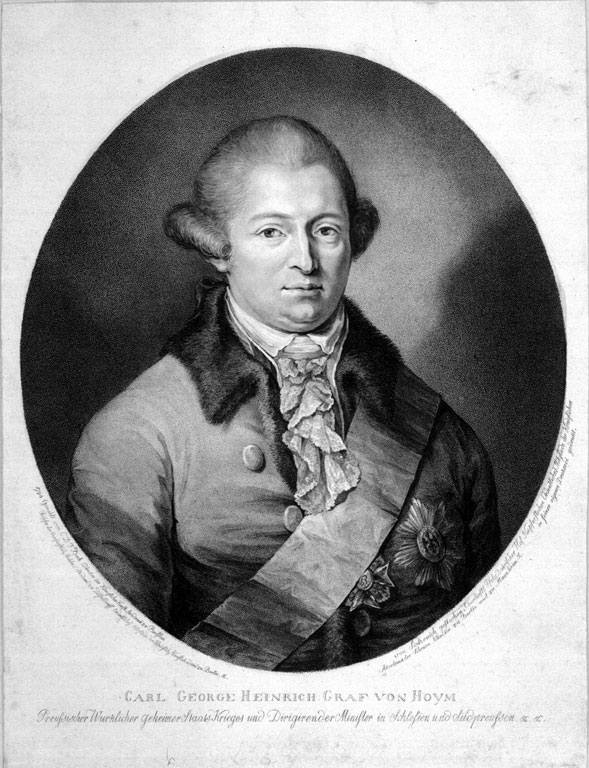
Baron von Hoym - print

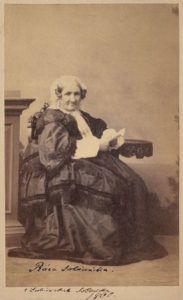
Rozalia Sobańska née Łubieńska photographed in 1860

== See also ==
- Sobański Palace
- Zyrardow
