= Feliks Sobański =

Count Feliks Hilary Sobański
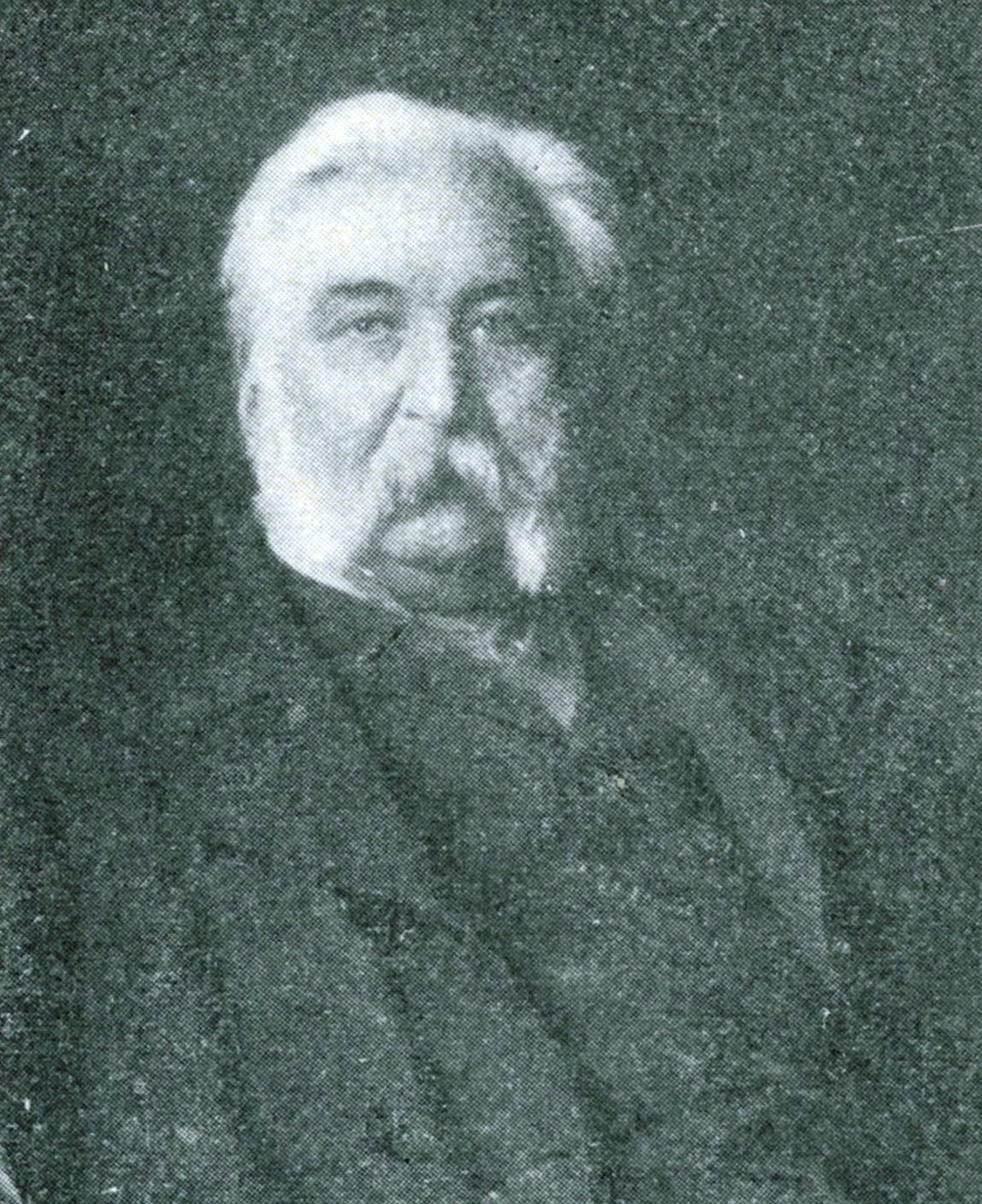
- Count Feliks Sobański in the early 1900s
- Full name: Feliks Hilary Ludwik Michał Sobański
- Born: 11 January 1833; Ładyżyn, Podolia
- Died: 29 November 1913 (aged 80); Paris, France
- Noble family: Sobański
- Spouse: Emilia Lubienska
- Issue: Michał; Kazimierz; Wiktoria
- Father: Ludwik Sobański
- Mother: Róża Łubieńska

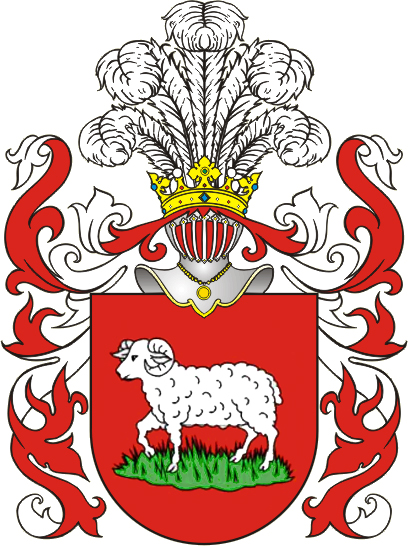
Junosza arms, Sobański family crest

Feliks Hilary Ludwik Michał Sobański (born 11 January 1833 nr. Hajsyn Podolia - died 29 November 1913 Paris) was a Polish landowner, social activist, supporter of the arts and philanthropist. He was awarded the hereditary title of 'count' by the Holy See. His name is associated with the grand palace and grounds in Guzów in Masovia, Poland.

== Background ==
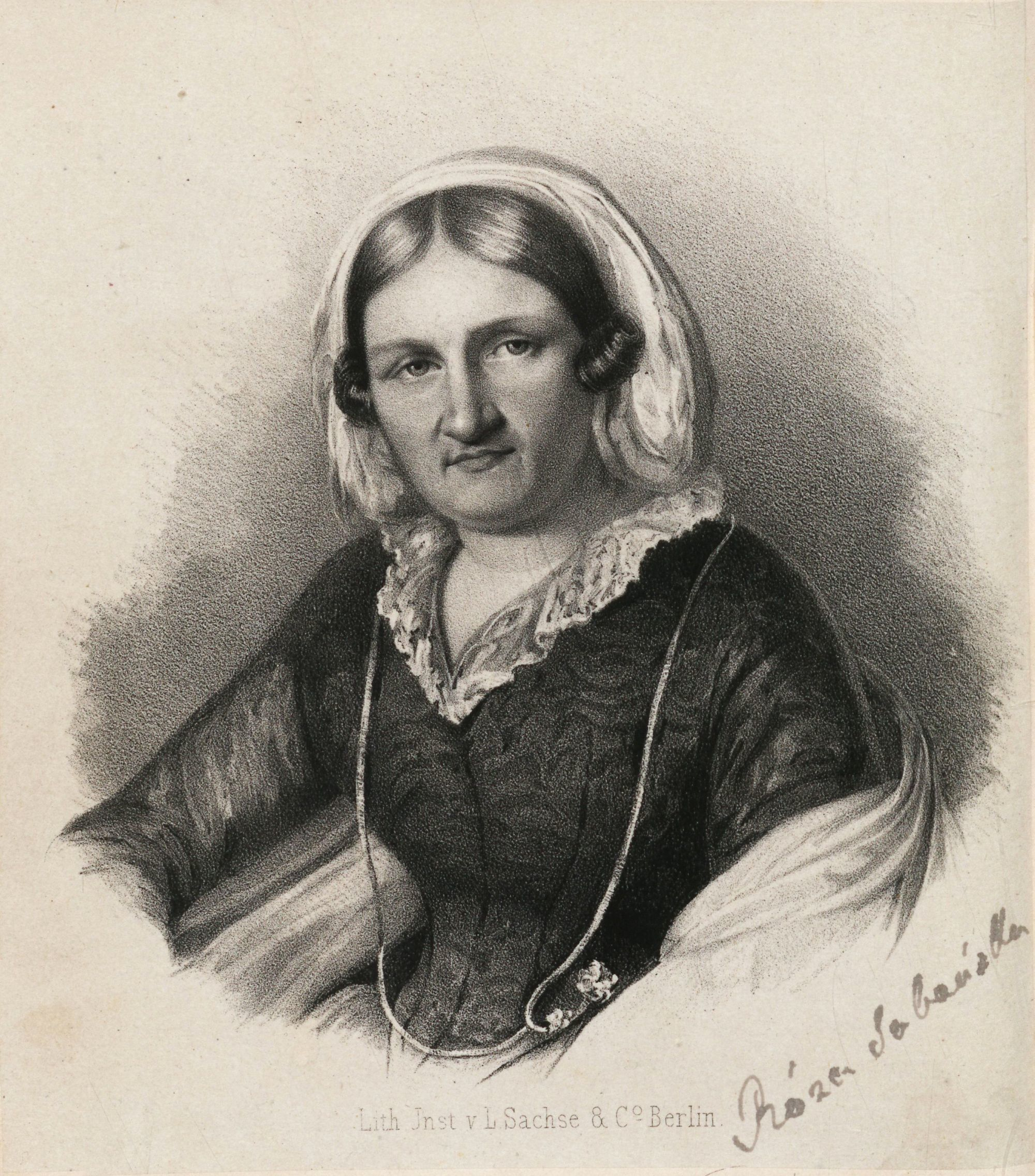
Sobański's mother, Róża, Siberian Rose

He was born into a Polish family of magnates. He was the youngest of four and the only son of Ludwik Sobański (1791-1837) and his wife, Róża, née Łubieńska, daughter of Feliks Lubienski and Tekla Teresa Lubienska. His father fell foul of the Russian authorities due to his dissident stance and was sentenced to years of exile in Siberia. His mother, at great personal risk, went to persistent lengths to aid her husband and others similarly banished. She used official means to bring them practical relief sending food parcels and correspondence. When the Russians cut off these supplies, she took to more clandestine methods. This earned her the sobriquet, Siberian Rose. Ludwik Sobański's ordeals affected his health; he died at 46 years of age when Feliks was barely four. Feliks' eldest surviving sister, Paulina (b.1824), married Adolf Jełowicki (1809-1891), veteran officer of the November Uprising in Podolia. Sobański attended school in Odessa. He did not go on to university, but travelled instead. While he was staying in Warsaw in 1852 a cholera epidemic broke out. With his kinsman, Ogiński, he set up a field hospital and helped to treat the victims.

On his return to his home province, he was set to administer the family estates in Obodówką and Wasylówką. He was a member of the committee working to abolish Serfdom in Poland, which eventually happened in 1864 in the Russian Partition.

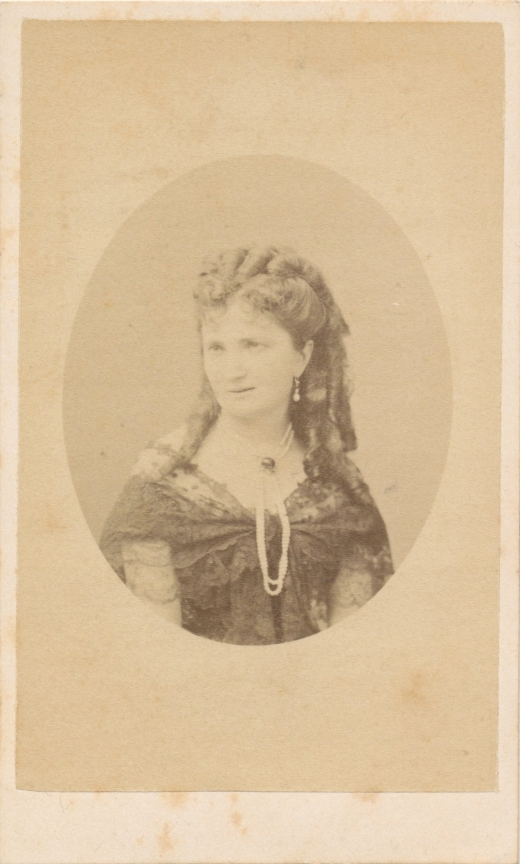
Emilia, wife of Feliks

In 1857 he married Emilia Łubieńska, a cousin. They had two sons, Michał and Kazimierz and a daughter, Wiktoria. From 1857 onwards, having acquired it at auction, he ran the vast 6,000 hectare estate of Guzów. It was a sale arising out of the confiscation of his and his wife's uncle Henryk's property due to charges of fraud. Following the death in 1869 of his relative, Eustachy Jełowicki, another November Uprising veteran, Sobański became the legal guardian of his five children.

== Career ==
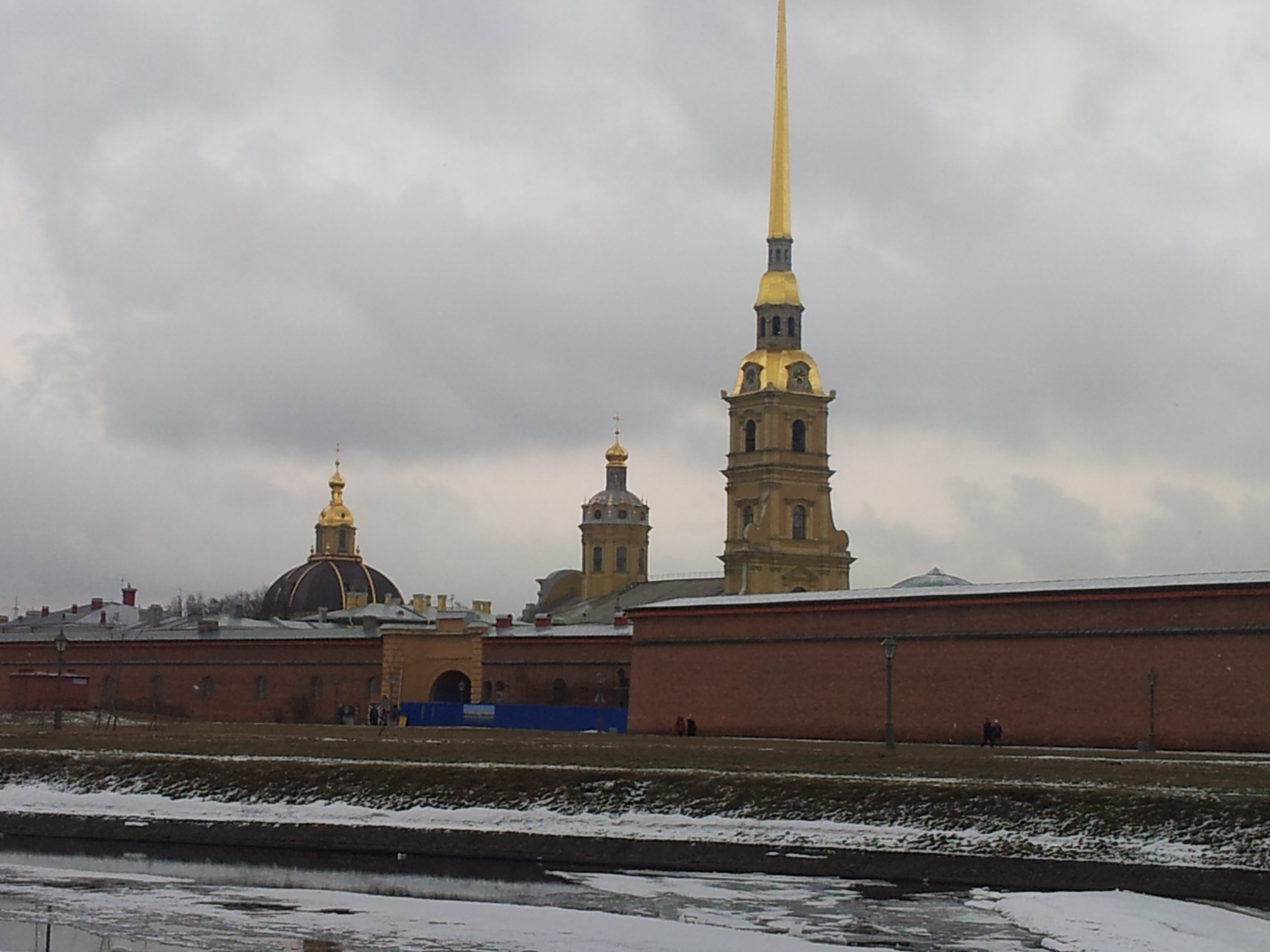
Peter and Paul Fortress, St. Petersburg

Sobański (like his father before him) was elected marshal of the nobility for the district of Bracław (in present-day Ukraine). When in 1862 his colleagues decided at an assembly in Kamieniec Podolski to seek to join the counties of Podolia and Wołyń to Congress Poland, he opposed the idea, but was out voted. Representations were therefore despatched to the Russian authorities. As a result, all the marshals were suspended from office, including Sobański, and were taken on remand to the Peter and Paul Fortress in St. Petersburg. They were charged with Sedition. He was sentenced by decree of the Russian Senate to exile in the depths of Russia. He was later allowed to move to Odessa and, finally, given leave to return to Podolia.

Following his release he travelled to France. While in Paris, he was caught up in the Franco-Prussian War of 1870. He arranged with the International Red Cross to hire an ambulance and personally assisted in the removal of the wounded from the battlefield. Between 1872 and 1885 he concentrated on estate and rural matters. He invested huge sums in rebuilding and refashioning the Guzów Palace, turning it into a French renaissance-style palace with a park in the English style. He was also concerned with the welfare of rural workers.

In 1875, he became a co-founder of the Museum of Industry and Agriculture in Warsaw (whose vice-president he would remain until 1913). That same year, joined the committee of the Warsaw arts academy, the Zachęta. He ran an architectural competition under its auspices in 1878 to design a parish church for the Mill town of Żyrardów, for which he donated the land. Also with the arts academy, he sponsored scholarships for young artists. He was involved in the Stanisław Moniuszko Music Society, which raised funds to aid the impoverished composer.

Sobański financed an extensive portfolio of church and other buildings and monuments, such as in Radziwiłłów, the chapel in Guzów, restorations in Obodówka and Wiskitki, paying for three marble altars to be brought from Italy for the church of St. Augustine in Warsaw or the restoration of the Sigismund's Column. He also funded travel bursaries for seminarians studying for the priesthood in Warsaw. He was rewarded in 1880 with a hereditary title of nobility from Pope Leo XIII.

== Foundations ==
Among his other philanthropic projects were:

- Headquarters and lodgings in Warsaw of a charity for disabled people, later expanded for:
- Single women and a home for orphans
- Catholic nursery in Kiev
- Cottage hospital in Guzów for free treatment for tenant farmers and estate workers
- A secondary agricultural school in Obodówka, overseen by the local farmers' association
- A teacher training college in Ursynów

== Later years ==
Sobański supported financially many social institutions in his homeland as well as in Paris, where there was a substantial Polish diaspora and where he settled for the last dozen years of his life. He participated in the cultural life of the capital and joined the Historical and Literary Society there. His final bounty was to give 100,000 roubles to the Polish rural workers retirement fund and 30,000 roubles to buy potatoes for the rural poor of Galicia suffering a period of famine. He died in Paris 1913 and was buried in the crypt of the church of St. Augustin. His remains were transferred to Obodówka in Podolia, shortly after the outbreak of World War I, but border controls prevented his family from abroad attending the interment.

== See also ==
- Sobański Palace
- Feliks Łubieński
- Théodore de Korwin Szymanowski
- Great Emigration

== Gallery ==
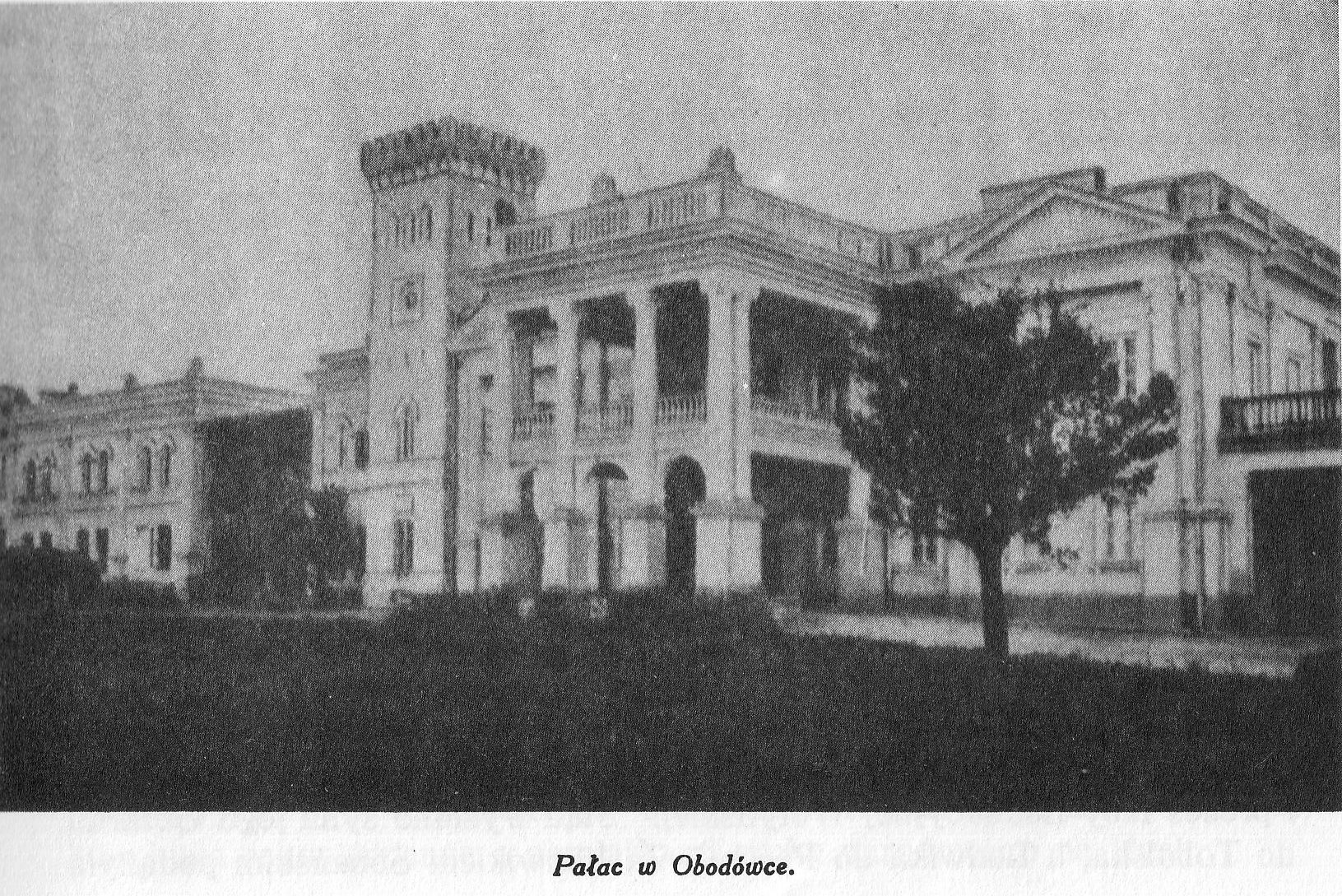
Sobański palace in Obodówka (Ukraine)

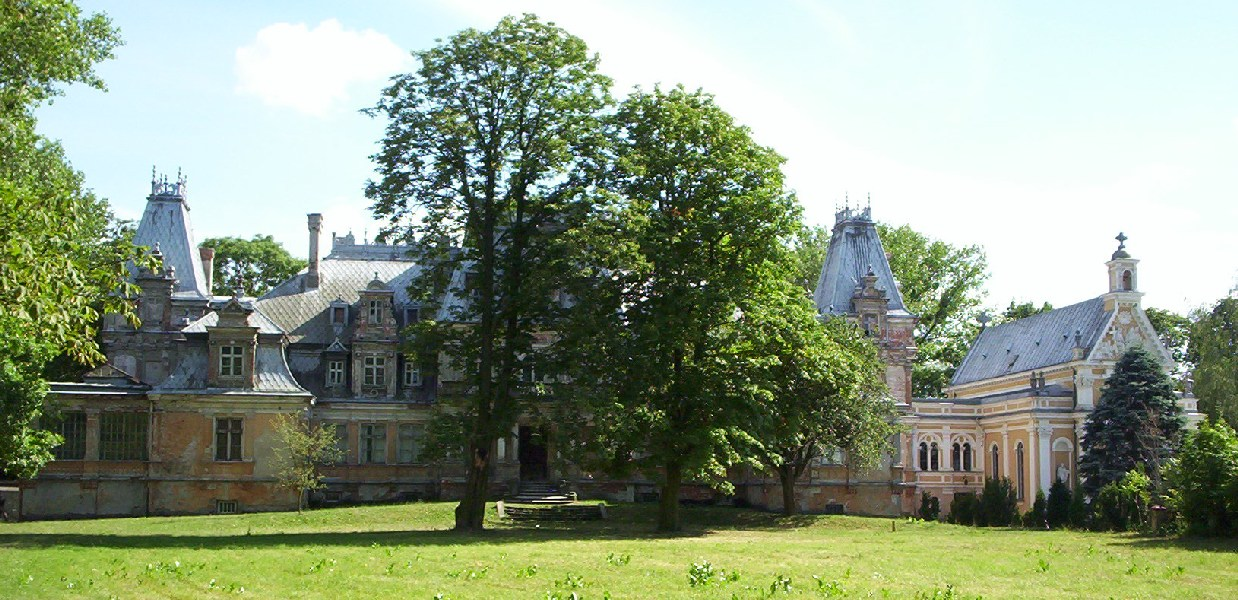
Guzów Palace before restoration

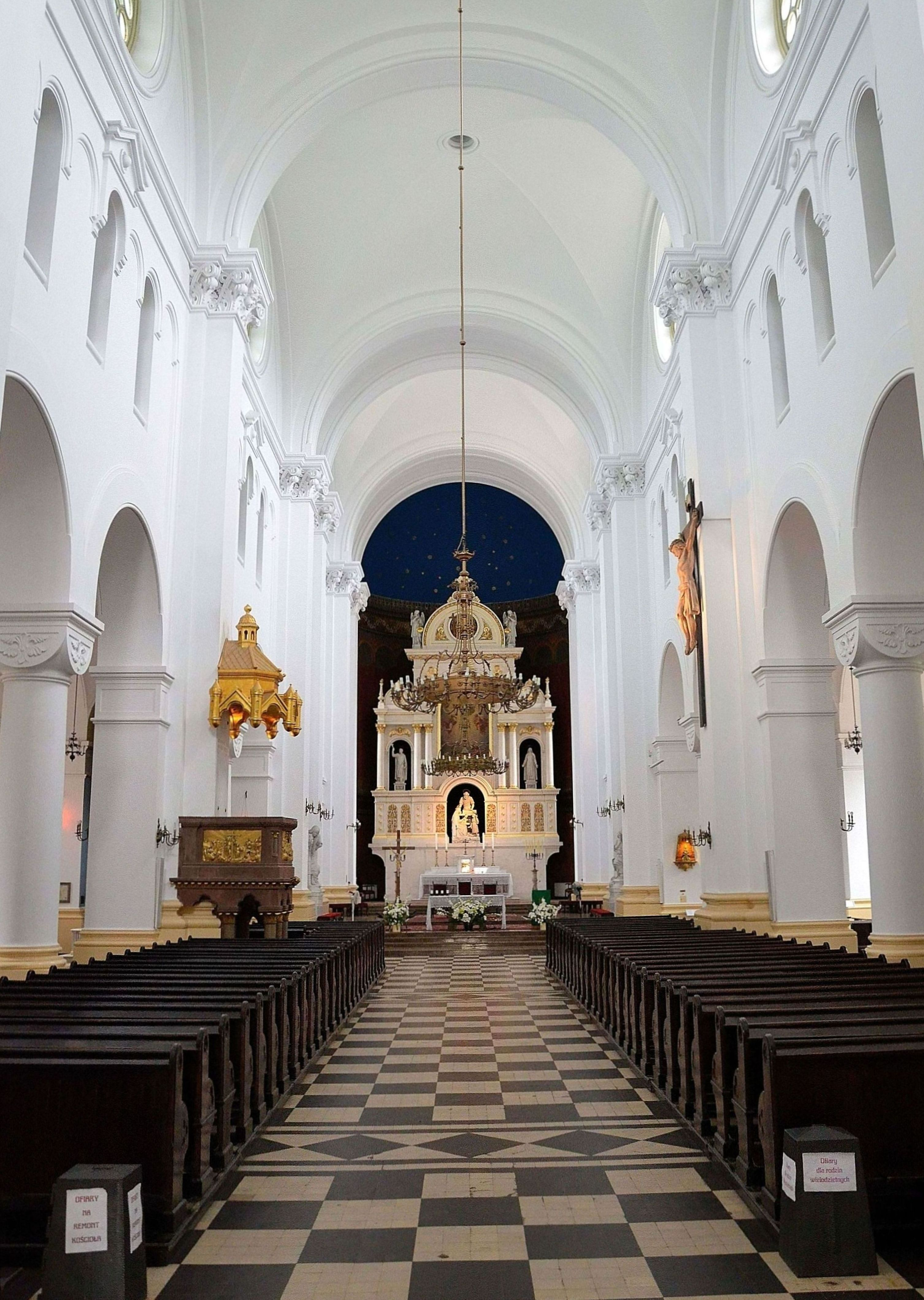
St. Augustine's church, Warsaw.

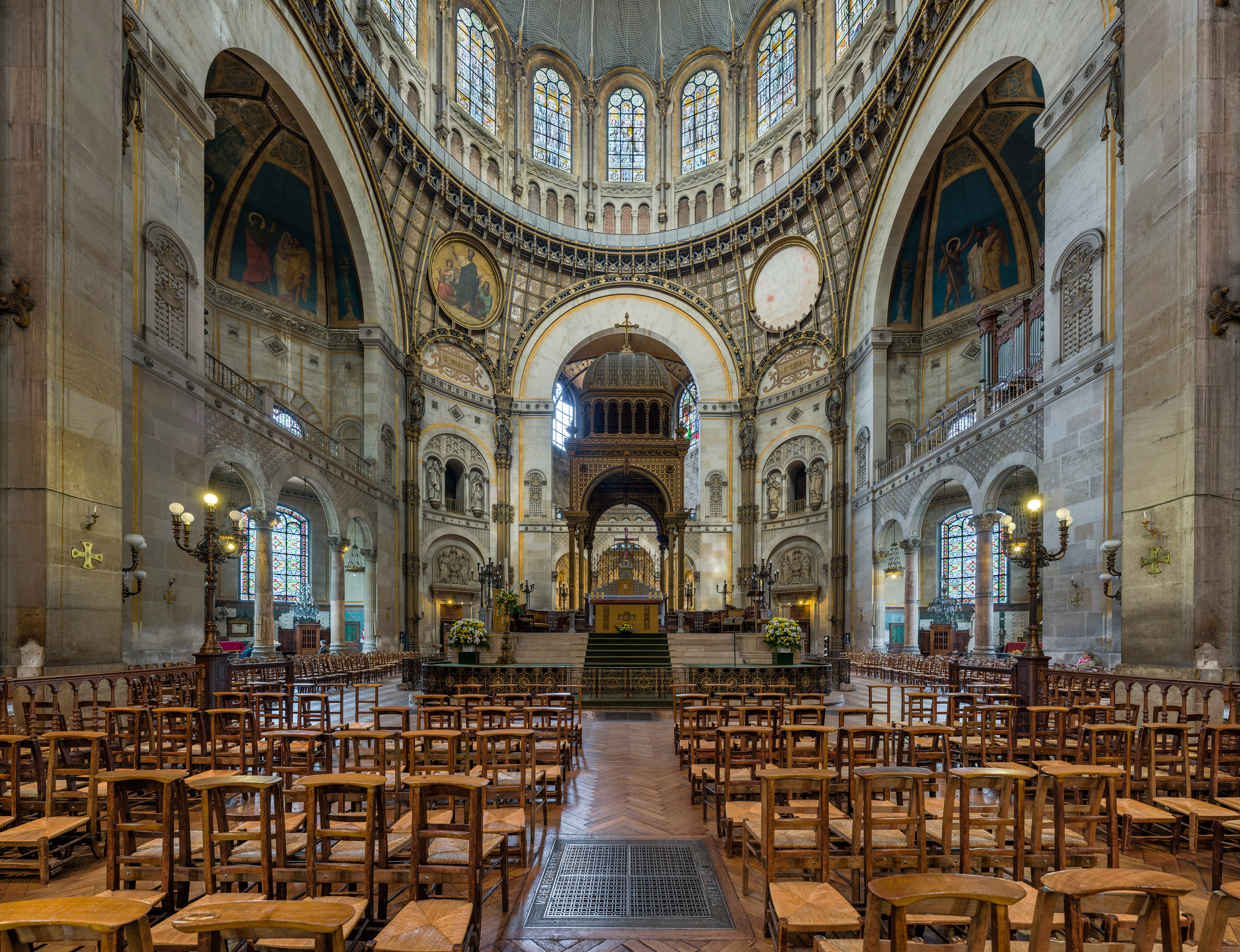
Saint-Augustin church Paris, Sobański's first burial place

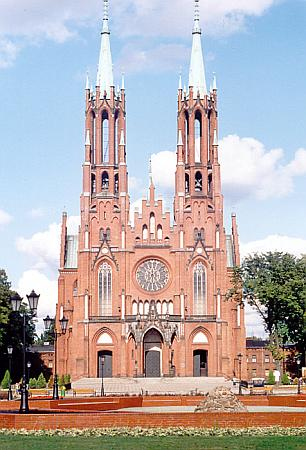
Żyrardów - Church of the Blessed Virgin

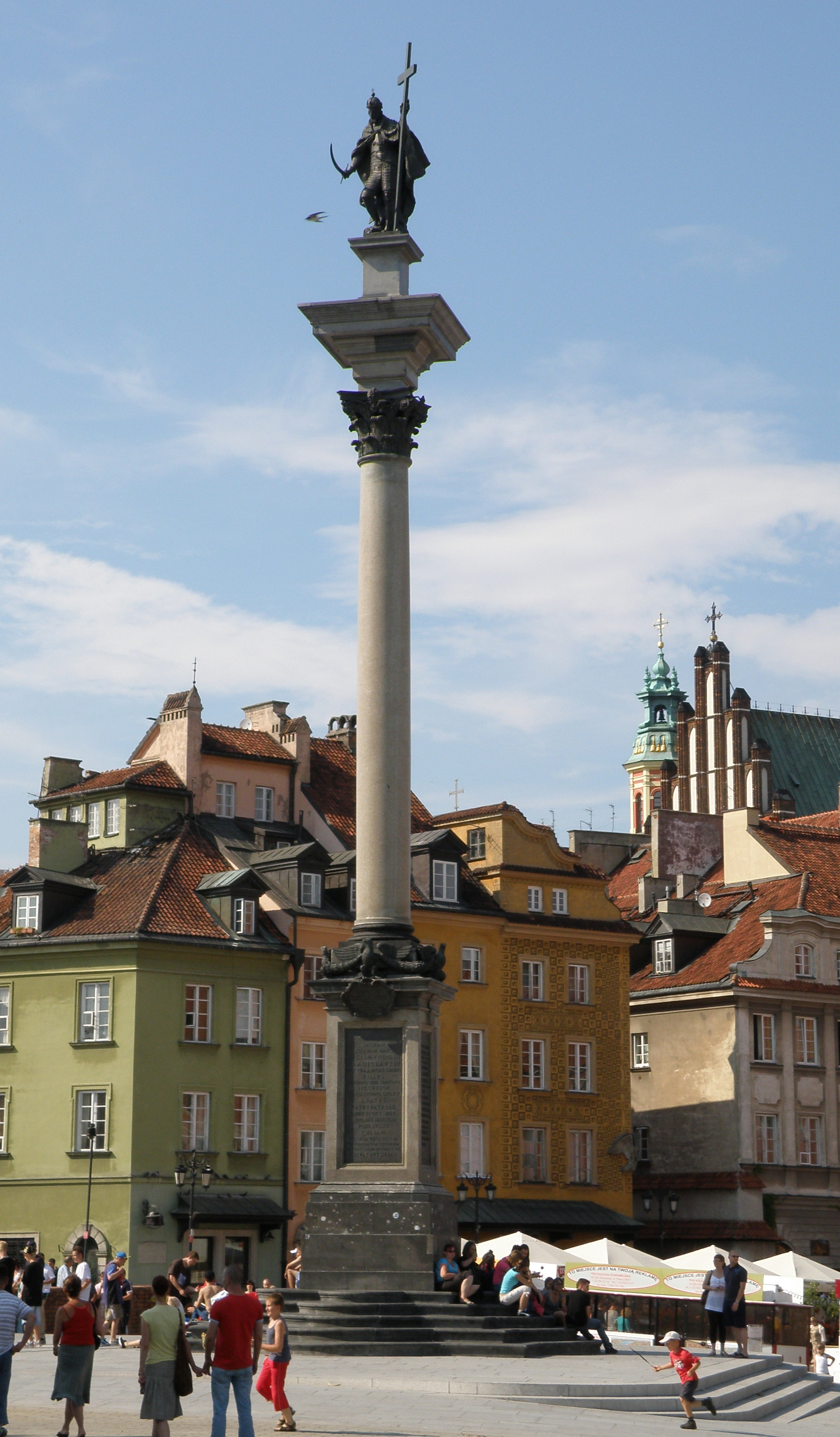
King Sigismund's Column, Warsaw

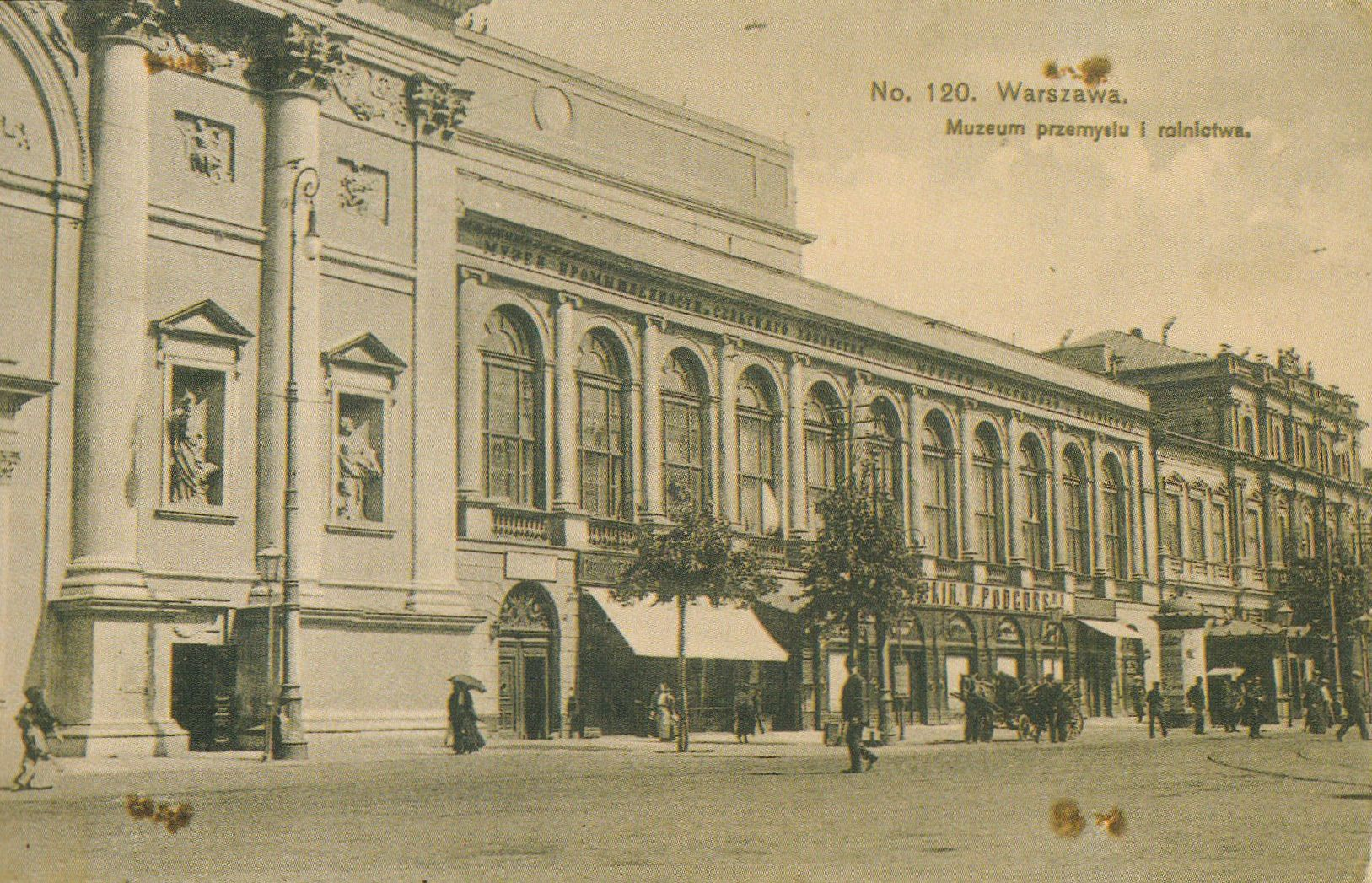
Warsaw Museum of Industry and Agriculture, c. 1908
