= Antoni Sobański =

Polish journalist, writer and socialite

Antoni Marian Henryk Sobański
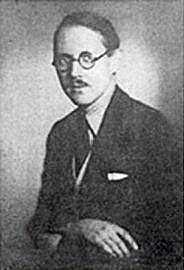
- Born: 1 May 1898 Obodówka, Poland
- Died: 13 April 1941 (aged 42) London, England

Antoni Marian Henryk Sobański (1 May 1898 – 13 April 1941) was a Polish journalist, writer and socialite. He is mainly associated with Wiadomości Literackie (a literary newspaper) and the liberal artistic bohemia of the Polish interwar period, including Skamander. He worked for both The Times and the BBC.

He is mentioned in many literary testimonies of the era, appearing in the works of Jarosław Iwaszkiewicz (Aleja Przyjaciół), Irena Krzywicka (Wyznania gorszycielki), Witold Gombrowicz (Wspomnienia polskie), Zofia Nałkowska (Dzienniki), Anna Iwaszkiewicz, and in the letters of Czesław Miłosz.

== Life ==
He was born in Obodivka in 1898 to a landed gentry family. His parents were Count Michał Maria Sobański (1858–1934) and Countess Ludwika Maria née Wodzicki (1857–1944). He had two older siblings, a brother called Feliks (1890–1965) and a sister called Teresa (1891–1975). In 1905, the whole family moved to Warsaw. He learned to speak six languages fluently. Between 1917 and 1925, he studied at various universities (including Jagiellonian University and the University of Warsaw). He did not graduate, however, complaining about the "institutionalized way of learning".

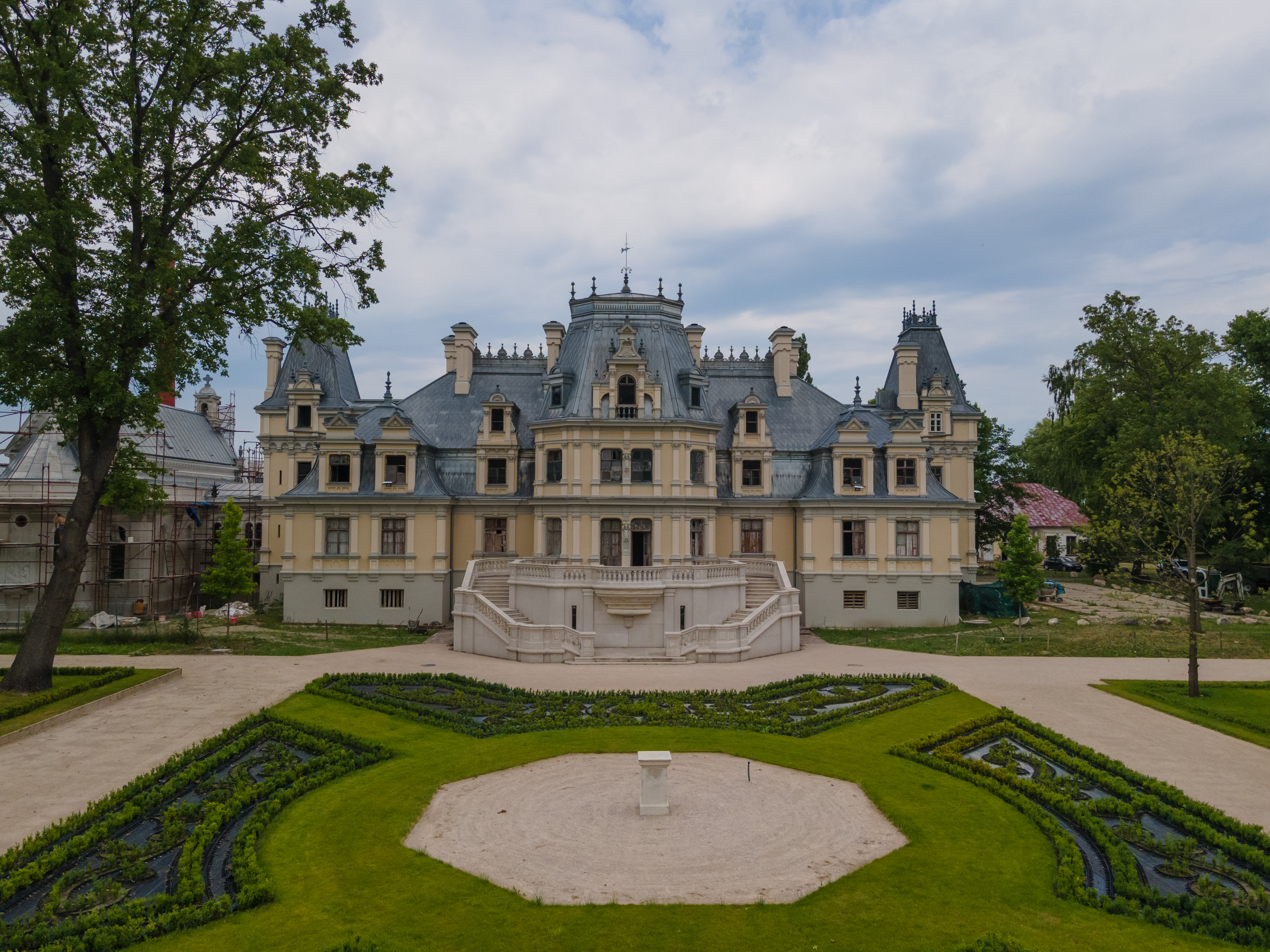
Sobański Palace in Guzów

After the death of his uncle, he inherited the Guzów estate near Sochaczew, along with a thriving sugar factory. He divided his time between his duties on the estate, intensive social life in Warsaw (where he shared a flat with his brother), and trips to London (which he regularly visited and where he had his own flat).

Although he is mostly remembered as a journalist and writer, he wrote rarely. He created a series of reports for Wiadomości Literackie, later collected in a book, Cywil w Berlinie (lit. A Civilian in Berlin, 1934), in which he made in-depth and accurate observations regarding the mechanism of the expansion of totalitarianism in Germany. Demonstratively reluctant about fascism and nationalism, he praised the British constitutional monarchy system and European culture. Although he was friendly with many Germans, he also had positive relationships with many Jews during the years of anti-Semitism in Poland.

In the Warsaw literary society, he was known as "Count Tonio". Openly gay, his relationships and sexuality were mentioned by both Jarosław Iwaszkiewicz and Irena Krzywicka in their writings. Iwaszkiewicz emphasized his friendship with Achilles Breza, comparing them to Oscar Wilde and Lord Douglas, and Irena Krzywicka his relationship with Jan Tarnowski.

When the second World War broke out, he was staying at Iwaszkiewicz's property in Stawisko. On 5 September 1939, together with a group of friends, he moved to Kazimierz Dolny. Later, with Antoni Słonimski, he emigrated to Great Britain via Romania, Yugoslavia, and Italy. Whilst in London, he took a job at the Soldiers Aid Committee. He also worked for BBC radio and wrote for the Polish émigré magazine Wiadomości Polskie, Polityczne i Literackie. He later tried to move to the United States, where he owned a small estate in Santa Fe. However, this attempt failed. He died of tuberculosis in 1941 in London.

== Literary works ==
Only a few pieces of his writing were published. In 1929, under his initials, AS, he published a brochure entitled 18 lat?!!! (18 years?!!) in Warsaw. He earned recognition and fame through a series of reports from Germany, which appeared periodically in Wiadomości Literackie, and which illustrated the emergence of Nazism after Adolf Hitler came to power. In 1934, the reports were collected in the book Cywil w Berlinie (A Civilian in Berlin). It was re-released, with other reports added, in 2006 by the publishing house "Sic!" in Warsaw. The following year, they were translated into German. In 1938, in Santa Fe, Sobański published Wigilia w San Filipe (Christmas Eve in San Filipe). He was also the author of two sketches: Ulica Krucza (Krucza Street) and Trzy kraje dzieciństwa (Three Countries of Childhood), which were published in London in 1942.
