= Sobański Palace =

- Pałac Sobańskich w Guzowie
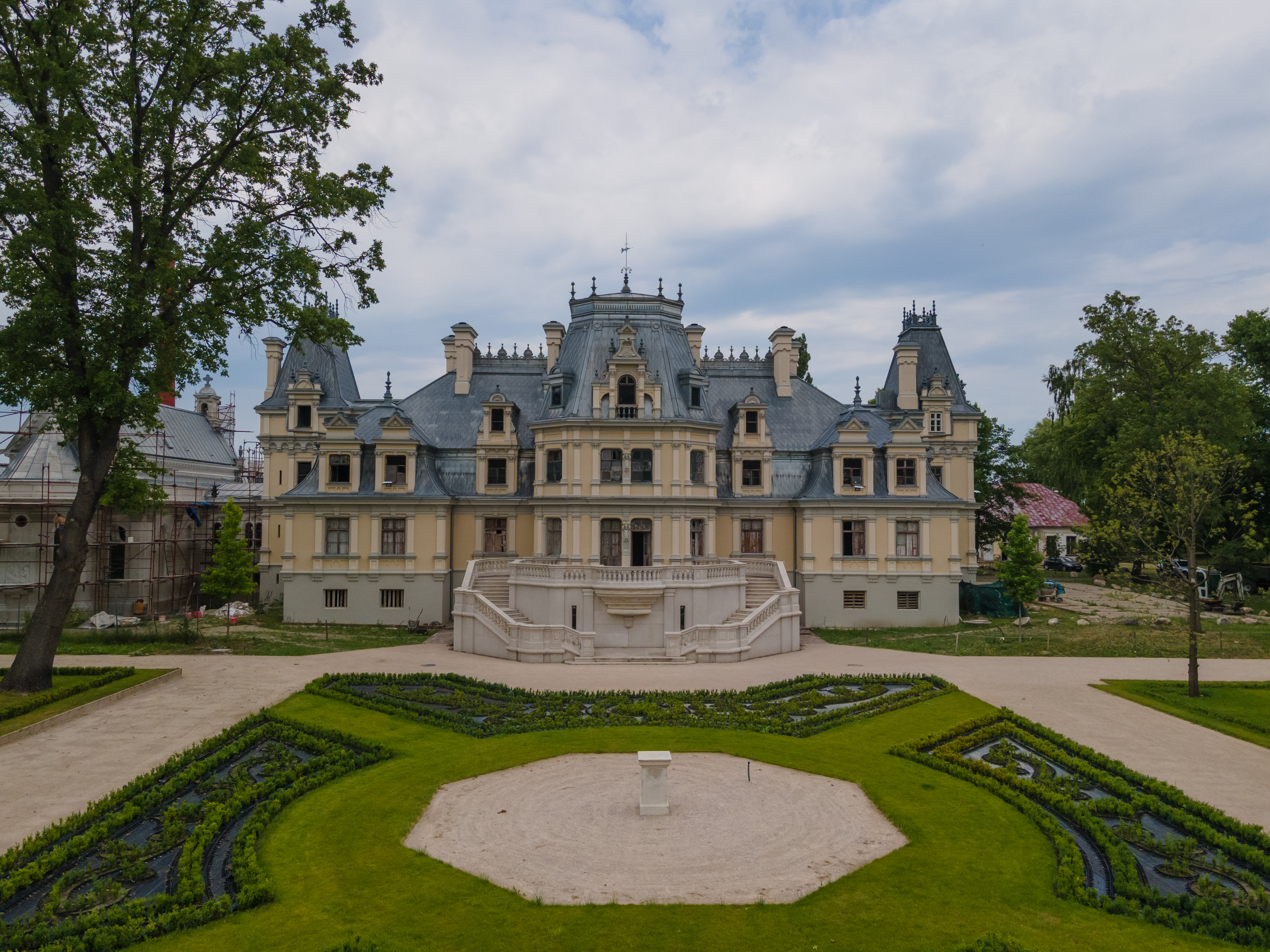
- The palace seen from the garden, 2022.

- Location within Poland Location within Masovian Voivodeship

General information
- Type: Palace
- Architectural style: Renaissance Revival
- Location: Guzów, Poland
- Coordinates: 52°06′56″N 20°20′05″E
- Completed: 1880
- Client: Feliks Sobański
- Owner: House of Sobański

Design and construction
- Architect: Władysław Hirszel

The Sobański Palace (Polish: Pałac Sobańskich w Guzowie) is a Renaissance Revival palace built in 1880 and located in Guzów, Żyrardów County, Mazovian Voivodeship, Poland. The palace served as a residence of such prominent Polish noble families as Potocki, Ogiński, and Sobański.

== History ==
=== 18th century ===
The ducal domain of Guzów goes back to the Late Middle Ages and its owner, Siemowit IV, Duke of Masovia. In the second half of the 18th-century, a fortuitous marriage to Paula, née Szembek, widow of Jan Prosper Potocki, enabled nobleman Andrzej Ogiński to receive the estate in her dowry. They were the parents of a daughter and of noted composer Michał Kleofas Ogiński. The palace is the birthplace of the composer. Andrzej Ogiński built a brick manorial complex in Late baroque style on the Guzów site.

After the third partition of Poland it became the property of the Prussian state, but handed to minister, baron Karl Georg von Hoym for his services. He in turn decided to sell it back to its erstwhile owner, the widow Ogińska, when her first-born son, Feliks Łubieński stepped in with the offer of his two estates in exchange for Guzów. It was accepted. He and his immediate family owned the estate till the 1840s. In 1842 Henryk Lubienski got into severe financial difficulties that resulted in the estate being auctioned off in 1856 to recover debts.

=== 19th century ===
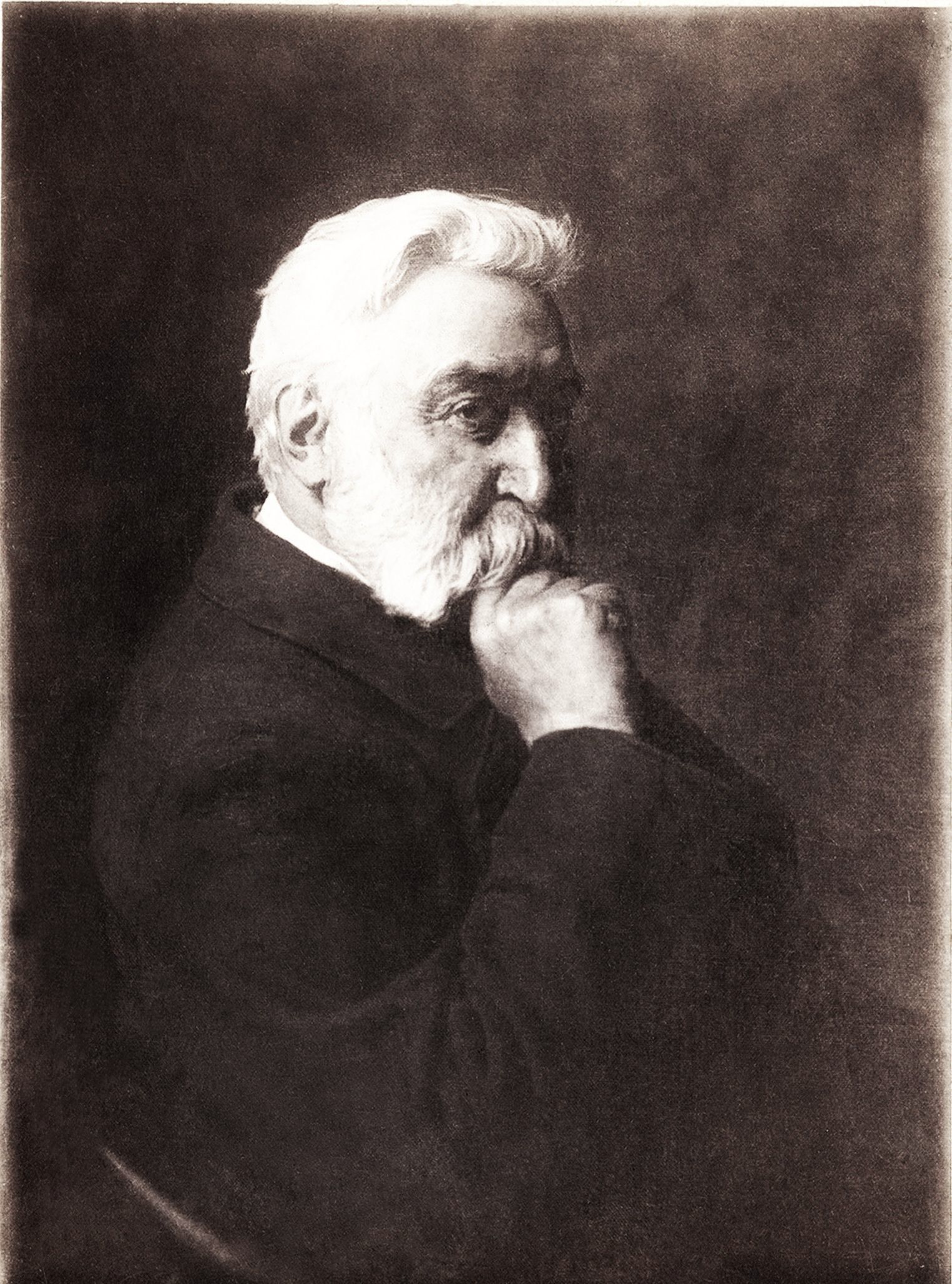
Count Feliks Hilary Sobanski

It was rescued by a grandson of Feliks Łubieński, Feliks Sobański from Podolia, who bought the estate for a considerable sum, wiping out the debts. In the last quarter of the nineteenth century, Sobański commissioned architect Władysław Hirszel to rebuild the manor house as a grand palace, modelling it on French Loire Valley castles. A landscaped garden was designed by Walerian Kronenberg and Franciszek Szanior. Sobański and his family regularly travelled across Europe visiting such places as Vienna, Karlsbad, Naples, Rome, Paris and Warsaw and transported to the palace furniture, sculptures and paintings, which were used for decorating the palace rooms. Among the items bought by Sobański were two fireplaces from the Tuileries Palace, which was destroyed during the Paris Commune in 1871. In 1886, Sobański passed the property to his youngest son, Kazimierz.

=== 20th century ===
During the First World War the palace was used as a front line hospital, and was virtually destroyed, along with its garden. During the interwar period, it was rebuilt, but after the Second World War the palace was looted for its decorations and furnishings by the Germans and later by the Russians. Later, the palace was used as accommodation for the local sugar factory's employees. Since 1948, the palace chapel has served as a local parish church. In 1962, the palace complex was officially inscribed onto the register of historical monuments becoming a protected historical landmark. The park was inscribed in 1981. In 1996, the Sobański family regained possession of the palace complex.

In 2009, Michał Sobański and his sister Izabela Ponińska established the Count Feliks Sobański Foundation (Polish: Fundacja im. Feliksa hr. Sobańskiego) whose main purpose is to raise funds for the renovation of the palace.

After many years of dereliction, the house is now being restored from its poor condition, along with the garden. The old palace chapel (now the Church of St Felix de Valois), together with a section of the garden, is the only part of the property that has been fully restored.

== See also ==
- Architecture of Poland
- Sobański Palace, Warsaw
- List of palaces in Poland

== Gallery ==
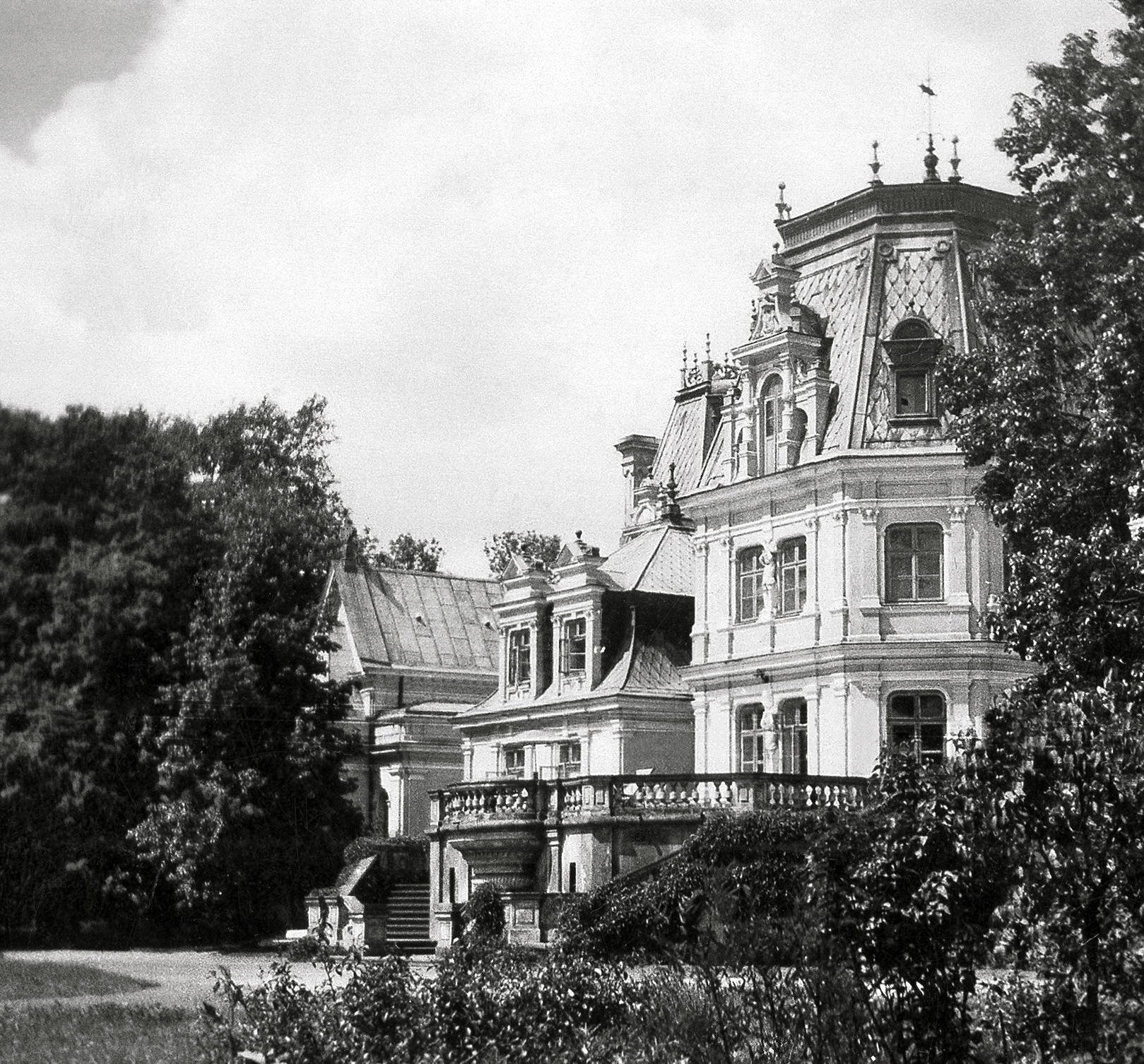
The palace in the 1930s

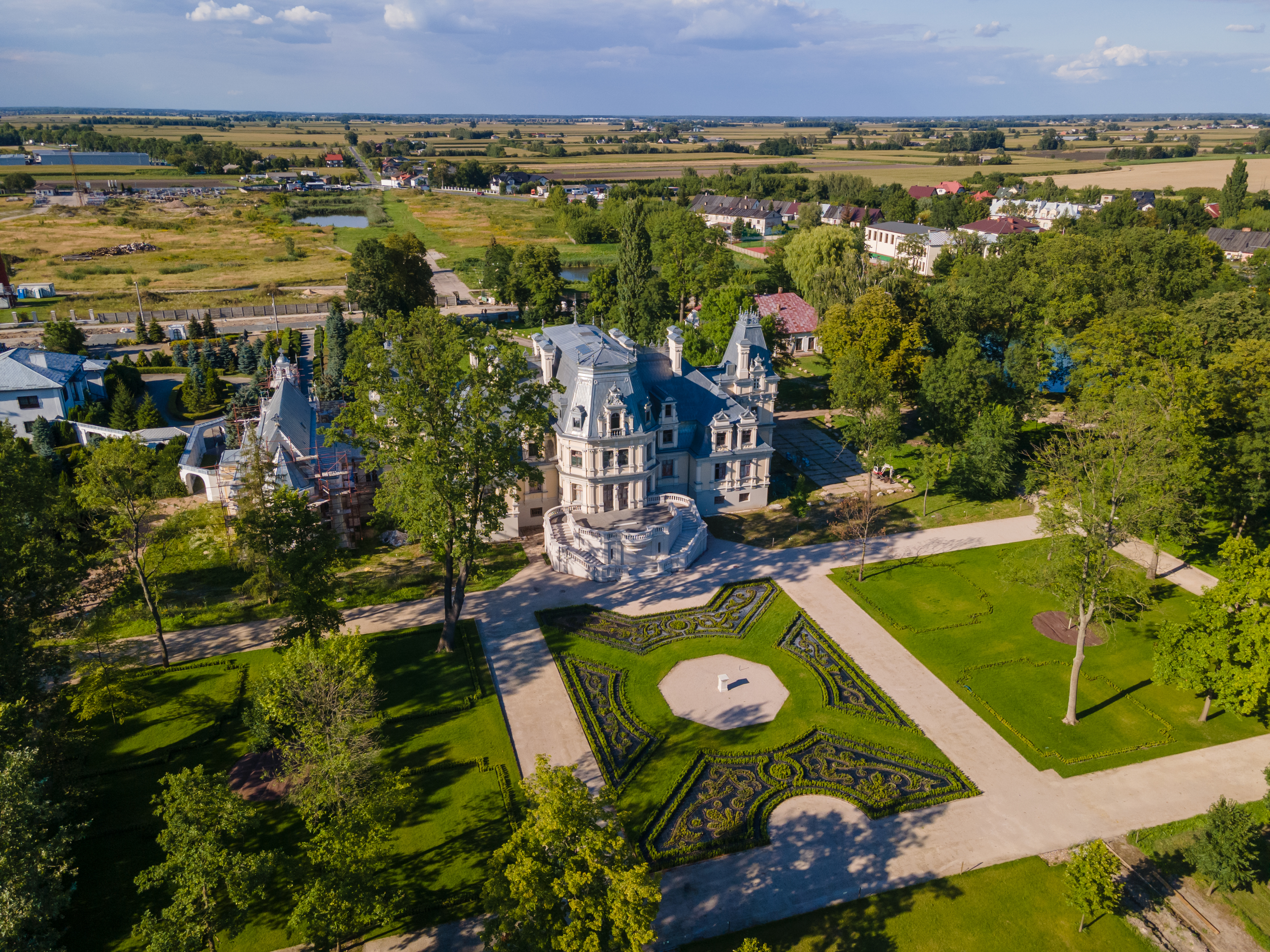
Aerial view

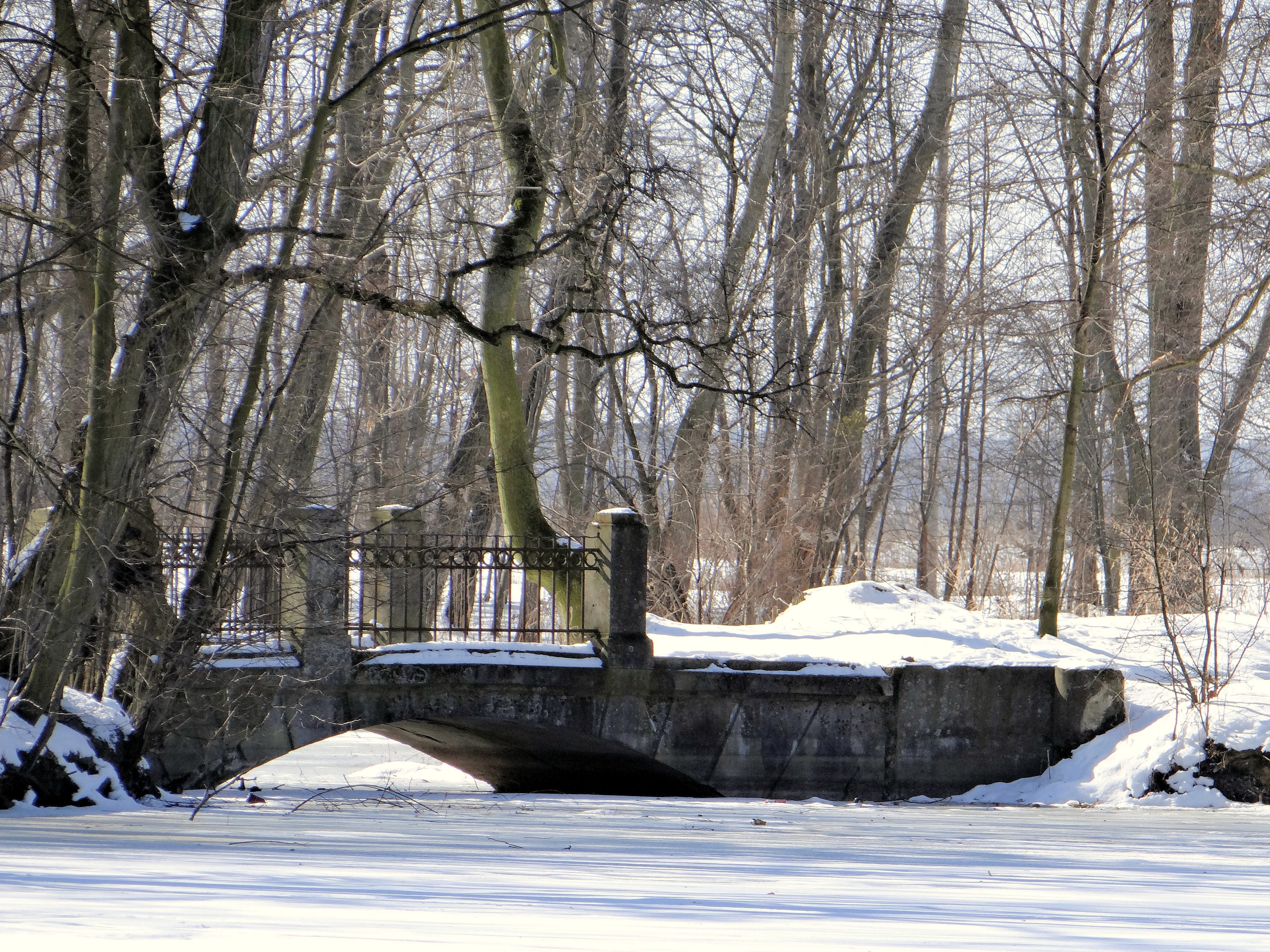
The park surrounding the palace

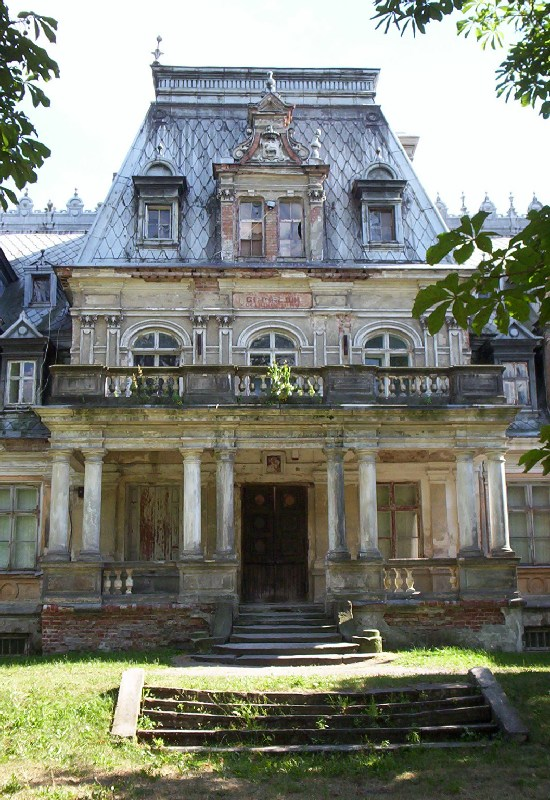
Palace before renovation

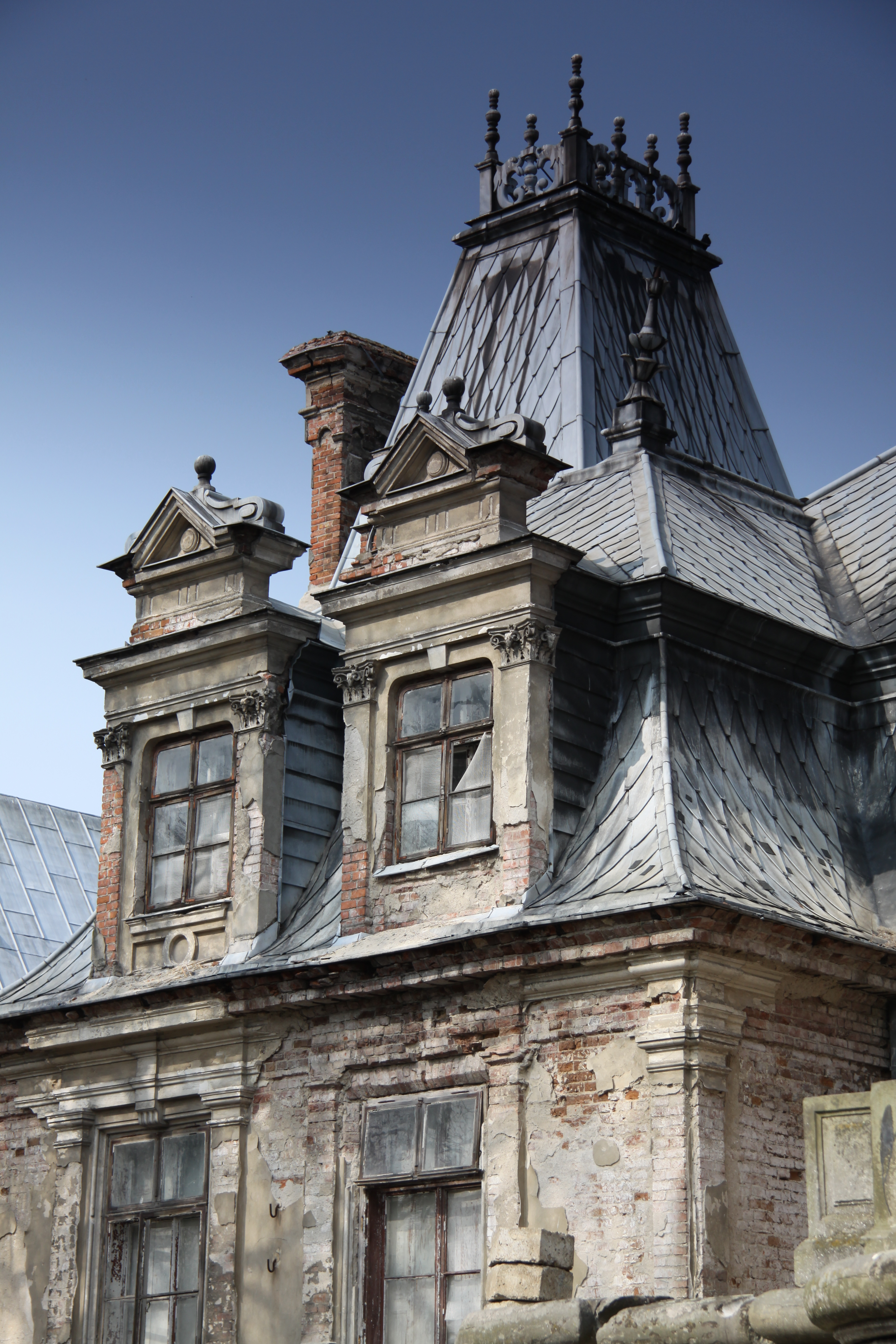
Palace before renovation

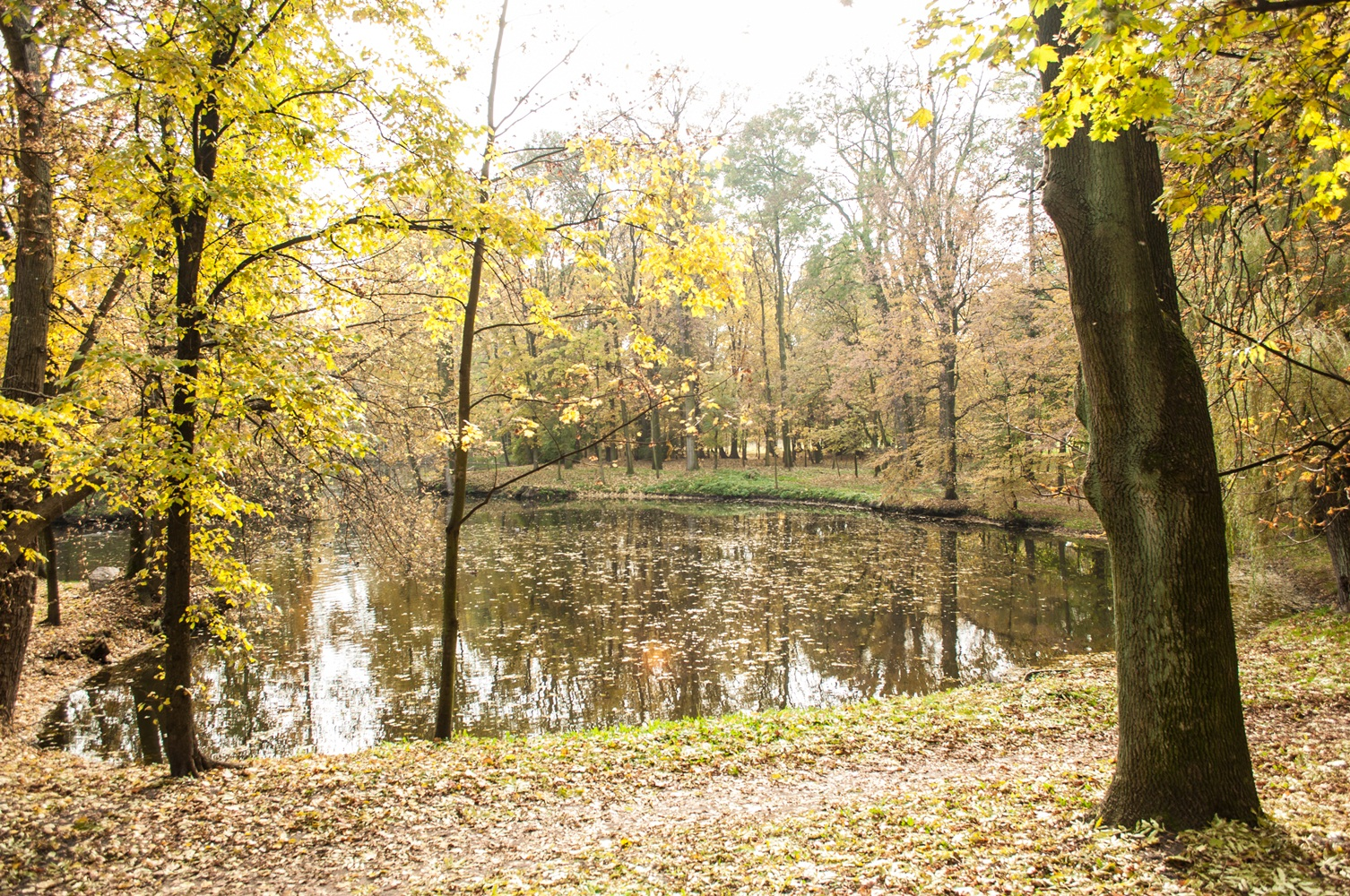
View of the park

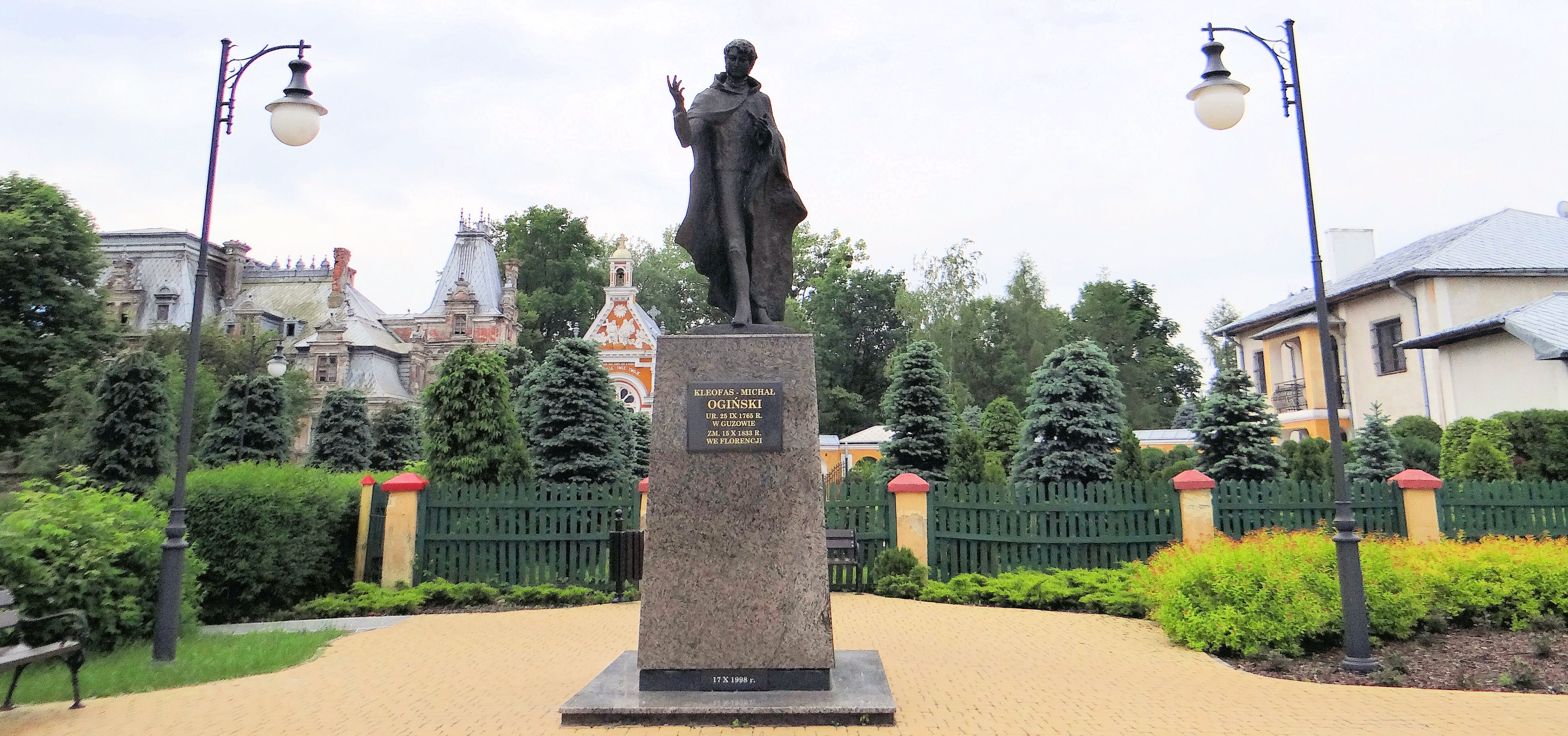
Monument to Michał Kleofas Ogiński in Guzów

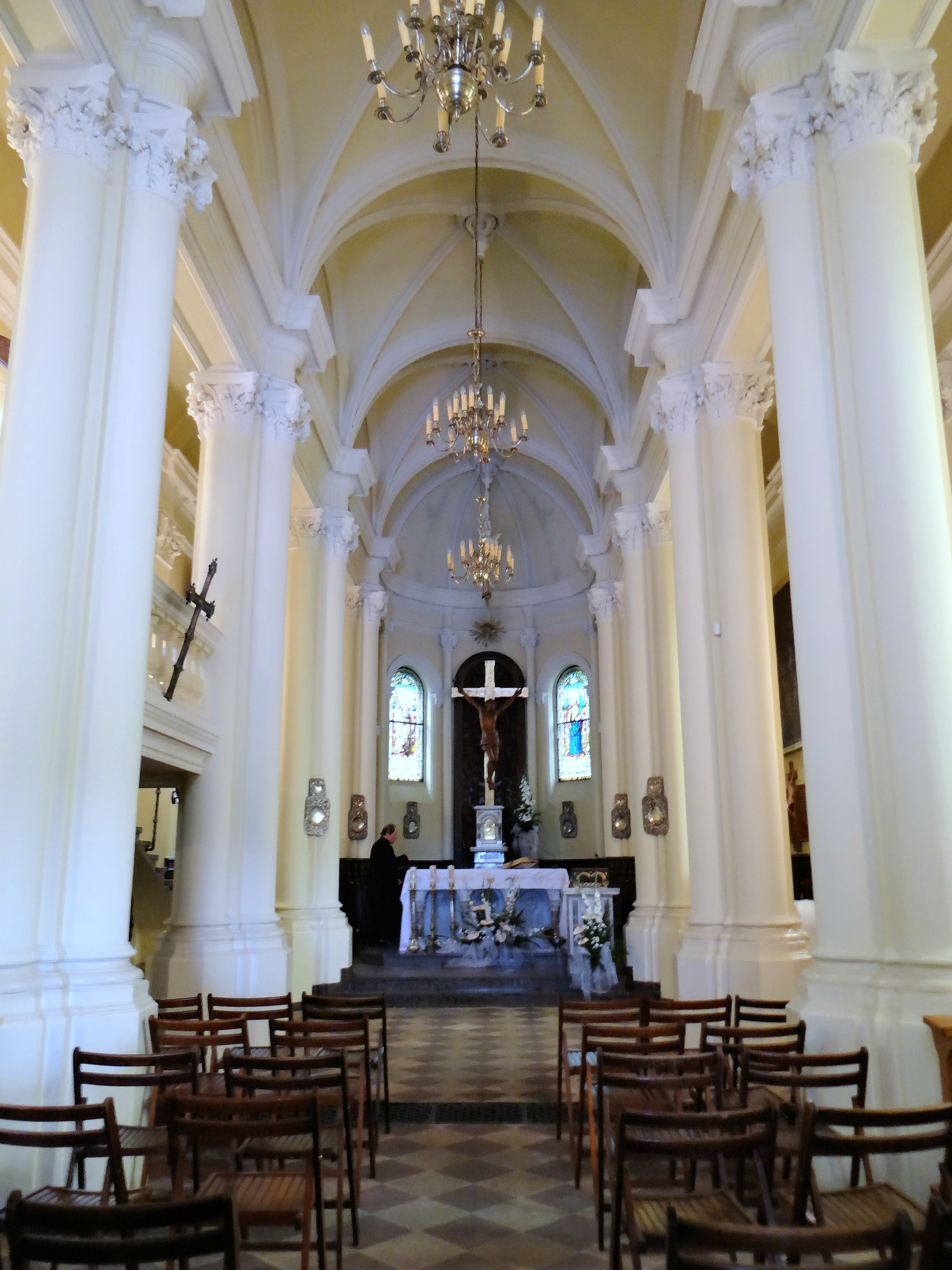
Interior of Church of Saint Felix of Valois

== Bibliography ==
1. Sylwester Rudnik, Historia guzowskiej rezydencji, w: Spotkania z zabytkami 6/2004
2. Katalog zabytków sztuki w Polsce. Tom X. Powiat grodzisko-mazowiecki, ISPAN, Warszawa 1967
