= List of Polish People's Army units =

This article provides formation lists of the Polish People's Army order of battle at various points in history between 1943 and 1989.

== 1945 Order of Battle ==
Following is the order of battle on 1 May 1945. This only refers to the entire Polish People's Army's ground forces. The PPA would be later expanded with the addition of the air and naval arms only after the war.

Supreme Command of the Polish Armed Forces

- Supreme Command Reserves
  - 11th Infantry Division
  - 12th Infantry Division
  - 13th Infantry Division
  - 14th Infantry Division
  - 1st Tank Corps (attached to 2nd Army)
  - 7th Heavy Tank Regiment
  - 10th Heavy Artillery Brigade
  - 46th, 49th, and 51st Rocket Artillery Regiments
  - 11th Antitank Artillery Brigade
  - 52nd Antitank Artillery Regiment
  - 4th Anti-Aircraft Artillery Division
  - 32nd Anti-Aircraft Artillery Regiment
  - 2nd and 5th Sapper Brigades
  - 3rd Engineer Bridging Brigade
  - 1st Army (subordinated to Soviet 1st Belorussian Front)
    - 1st Infantry Division
    - 2nd Infantry Division
    - 3rd Infantry Division
    - 4th Infantry Division
    - 6th Infantry Division
    - 1st Armored Brigade
    - 1st Cavalry Brigade
    - 4th Heavy Armored Regiment
    - Headquarters, 5th Artillery Division
    - 1st and 3rd Army Artillery Brigades
    - 2nd Howitzer Artillery Brigade
    - 5th Heavy Artillery Brigade
    - 4th Antitank Artillery Brigade
    - 13th Antitank Artillery Regiment
    - 1st Anti-Aircraft Artillery Division
    - 1st Sapper Brigade
  - 2nd Army (subordinated to Soviet 1st Ukrainian Front)
    - 5th Infantry Division
    - 7th Infantry Division
    - 8th Infantry Division
    - 9th Infantry Division
    - 10th Infantry Division
    - 16th Armored Brigade
    - 5th Heavy Tank Regiment
    - Headquarters, 2nd Artillery Division
    - 6th Light Artillery Brigade
    - 7th Howitzer Artillery Brigade
    - 8th Heavy Artillery Brigade
    - 9th and 14th Antitank Artillery Brigades
    - 28th Antitank Artillery Regiment
    - 3rd Anti-Aircraft Artillery Division
    - 3rd Mortar Regiment
    - 4th Sapper Brigade

== 1985 Order of Battle ==
Following is the order of battle in 1985, shortly before the fall of communism in Poland.

=== Ministry of Defense ===
Ministry of National Defence (Poland) and GHQ, Armed Forces of the People's Republic of Poland

- Military Education Inspectorate
  - Jozef Berna Rocket Forces and Artillery Academy
  - Air Defense Artillery Academy
  - Gen. Jakuba Jasinskiego Army Engineering Academy
  - Tadeusz Kościuszki Armored Forces Academy
- Polish General Staff
  - Signal Forces Directorate
    - Signal Forces College
  - Polish Armed Forces General Staff and Command College
- Territorial Defense Inspectorate
- Technology Inspectorate
  - Aviation Technology Committee
  - Naval Technological Committee
  - Military Technical Academy
- Quartermaster Directorate
  - Chaplaincy Service of the Armed Forces
  - Munitions Command
  - Military Communications Command
  - Armed Forces Medical Academy
  - Armed Forces Quartermaster Service Academy
- Cadres Department
- Political Affairs Directorate
  - Organizational Committee
  - Committee for Military Education
  - Dzerzhinsky Political-Military Academy in Warsaw
  - Political Officers Central School
  - Military History Institute
- Finance and Treasury Office
  - Organizational Inspections Department
- Headquarters and General Staff, Internal Military Service
  - Land Forces Military Police
    - Warsaw MD
    - Pomerania MD
    - Silesia MD
  - Air Force Security Command
  - Naval Military Police
  - Air Defense Forces IMS
  - IMS Military Academy

=== Polish People's Army Land Forces ===
Organisation of the Polish People's Army in 1985

- Land Forces Headquarters, in Warsaw
  - Polish Front Command, in Warsaw (would have formed the Warsaw Pact's Northern Front with an authorized strength of 205,620 soldiers in wartime)
    - 6th Pomerania Air Assault Division, in Kraków (reduced to 6th Pomorska Airborne Brigade in 1986)
      - 6th Air Assault Battalion, in Niepołomice
      - 10th Air Assault Battalion, in Oświęcim
      - 16th Kołobrzeski Air Assault Battalion, in Kraków
      - 18th Kołobrzeski Air Assault Battalion, in Bielsko-Biała
      - 5th Mixed Artillery Battalion, in Wola Justowska
      - 8th Supply Battalion, in Kraków
        - 1st Transport Company
        - 15th Medical Company
        - 24th Dropzone and Landing Sites Security Company
        - Weapons Maintenance Workshop
        - Automotive Maintenance Workshop
      - 120th Anti-aircraft Artillery Battery, in Kraków
      - 11th Sapper Company, in Kraków
      - 6th Signal Company, in Kraków
      - 22nd Chemical Defence Company, in Kraków
    - 7th Łużycka Naval Assault Division, in Gdańsk (reduced to 7th Łużycka Coastal Defence Brigade in 1986)
      - 33rd Company Command, in Gdańsk
      - 4th Pomerania Assault Regiment, in Lębork
      - 34th Budziszyński Assault Regiment, in Słupsk
      - 35th Gdańsk Assault Regiment, in Gdańsk
      - 11th Amphibious Tank Battalion, in Gdańsk
      - 20th Rocket Artillery Battalion, in Gdańsk
      - 41st Tactical Missile Battalion, in Gdańsk
      - 11th Sapper Battalion, in Lębork
      - 7th Maintenance Battalion, in Słupsk
      - 52nd Reconnaissance Company, in Lębork
      - 29th Anti-aircraft Artillery Battery, in Gdańsk
      - 23rd Signal Company, in Gdańsk
      - 7th Chemical Defence Company, in Słupsk
      - 7th Supply Company, in Gdańsk
      - 23rd Medical Company, in Gdańsk
      - Traffic Management Company, in Gdańsk
    - 1st Warsaw Engineer Brigade, in Brzeg
    - 2nd Signal Brigade, in Wałcz
    - 3rd Warsaw Missile Artillery Brigade, in Biedrusko (Tactical Ballistic Missiles)
    - 4th Chemical Defence Regiment, in Brodnica
    - 2nd Internal Signal Regiment, in Białystok
    - 2nd Radio-technical Reconnaissance Regiment, in Przasnysz
    - 8th Electronic Warfare Regiment, in Grudziądz
    - 10th Radio-location Reconnaissance Regiment, in Dziwnów
    - 15th Antitank Artillery Regiment, in Gniezno
    - 61st Surface-to-Air Missile Artillery Brigade, in Skwierzyna
    - 91st Wejherowo Anti-tank Artillery Regiment, in Gniezno
    - 1st Assault Battalion (Special Forces), in Dziwnów

==== Pomeranian Military District ====
- Pomeranian Military District, in Bydgoszcz (Readiness level A, would have formed 1st Combined-Arms Army with 91,000 soldiers in wartime)
  - 8th Dresden Mechanized Division, in Koszalin
    - 16th Dnowsko-Łużycki Tank Regiment, in Słupsk
    - 28th Sudecki Mechanized Regiment, in Kołobrzeg
    - 32nd Budziszyński Mechanized Regiment, in Kołobrzeg
    - 36th Łużycki Mechanized Regiment, in Trzebiatów
    - 4th Artillery Regiment, in Kołobrzeg
    - 83rd Anti-aircraft Artillery Regiment, in Kołobrzeg
    - 47th Rocket Artillery Battalion, in Szczecin
    - 1st Tactical Missile Battalion, in Trzebiatów
    - 15th Division Artillery Commander Command Battery, in Kołobrzeg
    - 5th Reconnaissance Battalion, in Kołobrzeg
    - 19th Sapper Battalion, in Unieście
    - 13th Signal Battalion, in Koszalin
    - 8th Supply Battalion, in Koszalin
    - 8th Maintenance Battalion, in Koszalin
    - 39th Medical Battalion, in Kołobrzeg
    - 64th Chemical Defence Company, in Koszalin
  - 12th Szczecin Mechanized Division, in Szczecin
    - 25th Dresden Medium Tank Regiment, in Szczecin
    - 5th Kołobrzeski Mechanized Regiment, in Szczecin
    - 9th Zaodrzański Mechanized Regiment, in Stargard
    - 41st Mechanized Regiment, in Szczecin
    - 2nd Artillery Regiment, in Szczecin
    - 124th Anti-aircraft Artillery Regiment, in Szczecin
    - 21st Rocket Artillery Battalion, in Szczecin
    - 22nd Tactical Missile Battalion, in Szczecin
    - 87th Division Artillery Commander Command Battery
    - 16th Reconnaissance Battalion, in Szczecin
    - 2nd Sapper Battalion, in Stargard Szczeciński
    - 33rd Signal Battalion, in Szczecin
    - 12th Supply Battalion, in Kobylanka
    - 8th Maintenance Battalion, in Gryfice
    - 45th Medical Battalion, in Stargard Szczecin
    - 19th Chemical Defence Company, in Stargard
  - 15th People's Guards Mechanized Division, in Olsztyn (disbanded in 1988)
    - 35th Tank Regiment, in Ostróda
    - 37th Mechanized Regiment, in Morąg
    - 50th Mechanized Regiment, in Lidzbark
    - 75th Mechanized Regiment, in Bartoszyce
    - 9th Artillery Regiment, in Olsztyn
    - 46th Anti-aircraft Artillery Regiment, in Olsztyn
    - 19th Tactical Missile Battalion, in Morąg
    - Division Artillery Commander Command Battery
    - 12th Reconnaissance Battalion, in Biskupiec
    - 46th Sapper Battalion, in Olsztyn
    - 29th Signal Battalion, in Olsztyn
    - Supply Battalion
    - Maintenance Battalion
    - Medical Battalion
    - Chemical Defence Company
  - 16th Kaszubska Armored Division, in Elbląg
    - 1st Warsaw Tank Regiment, in Elbląg
    - 51st Kościerski Tank Regiment, in Braniewo
    - 60th Kartuski Tank Regiment, in Elbląg
    - 55th Mechanized Regiment, in Braniewo
    - 16th Artillery Regiment, in Braniewo
    - 13th Anti-aircraft Artillery Regiment, in Elbląg
    - 48th Rocket Artillery Battalion, in Malbork
    - 4th Tactical Missile Division, in Malbork
    - Division Artillery Commander Command Battery
    - 17th Reconnaissance Battalion, in Elbląg
    - 47th Sapper Battalion, in Tczew
    - 43rd Signal Battalion, in Elbląg
    - 16th Supply Battalion, in Elbląg
    - Maintenance Battalion, in Elbląg
    - 57th Medical Battalion, in Braniewo
    - 61st Chemical Defence Company, in Elbląg
  - 20th Warsaw Armored Division, in Szczecinek
    - 24th Dresden Tank Regiment, in Stargard
    - 28th Saski Tank Regiment, in Czarne
    - 68th Tank Regiment, in Budowo
    - 49th Warszaw Mechanized Regiment, in Wałcz
    - 36th Artillery Regiment, in Budowo
    - 75th Anti-aircraft Artillery Regiment, in Rogowo
    - 26th Rocket Artillery Battalion, in Stargard
    - 7th Tactical Missile Battalion, in Budowo
    - Division Artillery Commander Command Battery
    - 8th Reconnaissance Battalion, in Stargard
    - 73rd Sapper Battalion, in Gryfice
    - 63rd Signal Battalion, in Szczecinek
    - Supply Battalion, in Szczecinek
    - Maintenance Battalion
    - Medical Battalion, in Stargard
    - Chemical Defence Company
  - 2nd Pomerania Artillery Brigade, in Choszczno (Tactical Ballistic Missiles)
  - 5th Mazurska Engineer Brigade, in Szczecin
  - 6th Warsaw Cannon Artillery Brigade, in Toruń
  - 7th Howitzer Artillery Brigade, in Toruń
  - 2nd Pomerania Chemical Defence Regiment, in Grudziądz
  - 4th Łużycki Signal Regiment, in Bydgoszcz
  - 14th Sudecki Anti-tank Artillery Regiment, in Kwidzyn
  - 56th Special Troops Company, in Szczecin (Long Range Reconnaissance)

==== Silesian Military District ====
- Silesian Military District, in Wrocław (Readiness level B, would have formed 2nd Combined-Arms Army with 89,500 soldiers in wartime)
  - 2nd Warsaw Mechanized Division, in Nysa
    - 15th Tank Regiment, in Gliwice
    - 6th Mechanized Regiment, in Częstochowa
    - 27th Mechanized Regiment, in Kłodzko
    - 33rd Mechanized Regiment, in Nysa
    - 37th Artillery Regiment, in Kędzierzyn-Koźle
    - 99th Anti-aircraft Artillery Regiment, in Ząbkowice Śląskie
    - 2nd Tactical Missile Division, in Kędzierzyn-Koźle
    - 37th Division Artillery Commander Command Battery, in Nysa
    - 10th Reconnaissance Battalion, in Nysa
    - 18th Sapper Battalion, in Nysa
    - 48th Signal Battalion, in Nysa
    - 2nd Supply Battalion, in Nysa
    - 2nd Maintenance Battalion, in Nysa
    - Medical Battalion
    - 21st Chemical Defence Company, in Nysa
  - 4th Pomerania Mechanized Division, in Krosno Odrzańskie
    - 18th Tank Regiment in Wędrzyn
    - 11th Złotowski Mechanized Regiment, in Krosno Odrzańskie
    - 12th Mechanized Regiment, in Gorzów Wielkopolski
    - 17th Dresden Mechanized Regiment, in Międzyrzecz
    - 22nd Artillery Regiment, in Sulechów
    - 128th Anti-aircraft Artillery Regiment, in Czerwieńsk
    - 24th Tactical Missile Division, in Sulechów
    - Division Artillery Commander Command Battery
    - 4th Reconnaissance Battalion, in Międzyrzecz
    - 5th Sapper Battalion, in Krosno Odrzańskie
    - 4th Signal Battalion, in Krosno Odrzańskie
    - 4th Supply Battalion, in Krosno Odrzańskie
    - 4th Maintenance Battalion, in Krosno Odrzańskie
    - 65th Medical Battalion, in Krosno Odrzańskie
    - 20th Chemical Defence Company, in Międzyrzecze
  - 5th Saska Armoured Division, in Gubin
    - 23rd Tank Regiment, in Słubice
    - 27th Tank Regiment, in Gubin
    - 73rd Tank Regiment, in Gubin
    - 13th Mechanized Regiment, in Kożuchów
    - 113th Artillery Regiment, in Kostrzyn nad Odrą
    - 5th Anti-aircraft Artillery Regiment, in Gubin
    - 25th Rocket Artillery Battalion, in Gubin
    - 18th Tactical Missile Division, in Kostrzyn nad Odrą
    - 84th Division Artillery Commander Command Battery, in Gubin
    - 2nd Reconnaissance Battalion, in Gubin
    - 14th Sapper Battalion, in Kostrzyn nad Odrą
    - 59th Signal Battalion, in Gubin
    - 5th Supply Battalion, in Kostrzyn nad Odrą
    - 5th Maintenance Battalion, in Gubin
    - 56th Medical Battalion, in Gubin
    - 60th Chemical Defence Company, in Gubin
  - 10th Sudeten Armoured Division, in Opole
    - 2nd Tank Regiment, in Opole
    - 10th Tank Regiment, in Opole
    - 13th Tank Regiment, in Opole
    - 25th Mechanized Regiment, in Opole
    - 39th Artillery Regiment, in Tarnowskie Góry
    - 18th Anti-aircraft Artillery Regiment, in Jelenia Góra
    - 8th Tactical Missile Division, in Tarnowskie Góry
    - 83rd Division Artillery Commander Command Battery, in Tarnowskie Góry
    - 7th Reconnaissance Battalion, in Brzeg
    - 41st Signal Battalion, in Opole
    - 21st Sapper Battalion, in Świdnica
    - Supply Battalion, in Opole
    - Maintenance Battalion, in Opole
    - 54th Medical Battalion, in Opole
    - 58th Chemical Defence Company, in Opole
  - 11th Dresden Armored Division, in Żagań
    - 3rd Tank Regiment, in Żagań
    - 8th Tank Regiment, in Żagań
    - 29th Tank Regiment, in Żagań
    - 42nd Mechanized Regiment, in Żary
    - 33rd Artillery Regiment, in Żary
    - 66th Anti-aircraft Artillery Regiment, in Bolesławiec
    - 43rd Rocket Artillery Battalion, in Żary
    - 10th Tactical Missile Battalion, in Żary
    - 17th Division Artillery Commander Command Battery, in Żagan
    - 9th Reconnaissance Battalion, in Żagań
    - 16th Sapper Battalion, in Żary
    - 34th Signal Battalion, in Żagań
    - Supply Battalion, in Żagań
    - 11th Maintenance Battalion, in Żagan
    - 11th Medical Battalion, in Żagan
    - 17th Chemical Defence Company, in Żagan
  - 4th Łużycka Engineer Brigade, in Gorzów Wielkopolski
  - 5th Pomerania Artillery Brigade, in Głogów
  - 14th Howitzer Artillery Brigade, in Głogów
  - 18th Artillery Brigade, in Bolesławiec (Tactical Ballistic Missiles)
  - 1st Chemical Defence Regiment, in Zgorzelec
  - 6th Security Regiment, in Wrocław
  - 10th Saski Signal Regiment, in Wrocław
  - 20th Anti-tank Artillery Regiment, in Pleszew
  - 62nd Special Forces Company, in Bolesławiec (Long Range Reconnaissance)

==== Warsaw Military District ====
- Warsaw Military District, in Warsaw (Readiness level C, would have formed 4th Combined-Arms Army with 64,700 soldiers in wartime)
  - 1st Warsaw Mechanized Division, in Legionowo
    - 11th Tank Regiment, in Giżycko
    - 1st Praski Mechanized Regiment, in Wesoła
    - 2nd Berliń Mechanized Regiment, in Skierniewice
    - 3rd Berliń Mechanized Regiment, in Ciechanów
    - 1st Berliń Artillery Regiment, in Bartoszyce
    - 1st Darnicki Anti-aircraft Artillery Regiment, in Modlin
    - 5th Tactical Missile Battalion, in Giżycko
    - Division Artillery Commander Command Battery
    - 1st Reconnaissance Battalion
    - 1st Sapper Battalion, in Pułtusk
    - Signal Battalion, in Legionowo
    - 1st Supply Battalion, in Legionowo
    - 1st Maintenance Battalion, in Łomża
    - 53rd Medical Battalion, in Skierniewice
    - 1st Chemical Defence Company, in Siedlce
  - 3rd Pomerania Mechanized Division, in Lublin (disbanded in 1988)
    - 5th Tank Regiment, in Włodawa
    - 7th Mechanized Regiment, in Lublin
    - 8th Mechanized Regiment, in Hrubieszów
    - 45th Mechanized Regiment, in Siedlce
    - 3rd Artillery Regiment, in Chełm
    - 18th Anti-aircraft Artillery Battalion, in Siedlce
    - 42nd Tactical Missile Battalion, in Choszczno
    - Division Artillery Commander Command Battery
    - 3rd Reconnaissance Battalion, in Lublin
    - Sapper Battalion
    - 53rd Signal Battalion, in Lublin
    - 3rd Supply Battalion, in Lublin
    - 3rd Maintenance Battalion, in Lublin
    - Medical Battalion
    - Chemical Defence Company
  - 9th Mechanized Division, in Rzeszów
    - 26th Tank Regiment, in Sanok
    - 4th Mechanized Regiment, in Kielce
    - 14th Kołobrzeski Mechanized Regiment, in Tarnów
    - 30th Mechanized Regiment, in Rzeszów
    - 40th Artillery Regiment, in Jarosław
    - 23rd Anti-aircraft Artillery Battalion, in Jarosław
    - 44th Tactical Missile Battalion, in Toruń
    - Division Artillery Commander Command Battery
    - 23rd Reconnaissance Battalion, in Jarosław
    - 13th Sapper Battalion, in Dębica
    - 30th Signal Battalion, in Rzeszów
    - 17th Supply Battalion, in Łańcut
    - Maintenance Battalion
    - Medical Battalion
    - Chemical Defence Company
  - 1st Warsaw Cannon Artillery Brigade, in Węgorzewo
  - 8th Howitzer Artillery Brigade, in Węgorzewo
  - 2nd Warszawska Engineer Brigade, in Kazuń Nowy
  - 32nd Łużycka Artillery Brigade, in Orzysz (Tactical Ballistic Missiles)
  - 3rd Chemical Defence Regiment, in Biskupiec
  - 5th Podhale Rifles Regiment, in Kraków
  - 9th Signal Regiment, in Białobrzegi
  - 15th Anti-aircraft Artillery Regiment, in Gołdap
  - 80th Anti-tank Artillery Battalion, in Suwałki
  - 48th Special Forces Company, in Kraków (Long Range Reconnaissance)

=== Air Force ===
Polish Air Force

- Polish Air Force Headquarters (Poznań)
  - Air Education Command
    - Polish Air Force Academy
      - 38th Training Regt
      - 58th Training Regt
      - 60th Training Regt
      - 61st Training Regt
  - Strategic Air Fighter Corps
    - 2nd "Bradenburg" Air Fighter-Bomber Division - Piła
    - 3rd "Bradenburg" Air Fighter-Bomber Division - Świdwin
    - 4th "Pomerania" Air Fighter-Bomber Division - Malbork
  - Air Combat Auxiliary and Transport Command
    - 32nd Air Interceptor Regt
    - 49th Helicopter Regt
    - 56th Helicopter Regt
    - 13th Air Transport Regt - Kraków
    - 36th Air Transport Regt
    - 37th Air Transport Regt- Warsaw

=== Navy ===
Polish Navy

- Polish Navy Headquarters (Gdynia)
  - Political Service and Headquarters Command
    - Central Band of the Polish Navy
  - Polish Navy Fleet Forces
    - 3rd Flotilla
    - 8th Coastal Defense Flotilla
    - 9th Coastal Defense Flotilla
  - Land formations under Navy HQ
    - 3rd Independent Marine Anti-Tank Regiment
    - 6th Marine Radio-electronic Regiment
    - 11th Naval Engineering Regiment
  - Naval Technical and Support Command
    - 9th Field Artillery Battalion (Coastal), under the Naval Technical Base
    - Naval Warehouses
  - Polish Naval Aviation
    - 7th Naval Fighter Regt
    - 16th Naval Aviation Regt (Special Purpose)
    - 15th Patrol Squadron
    - 18th Air Engineers Squadron
    - 42nd Naval Aviation Repair and Maintenance Workshops
  - Naval Education and Training Command
    - Polish Naval Academy "Heroes of Westerplatte" - Gdynia
    - Central Naval Specialists School
    - Naval Sailing Institute
    - Naval Divers School

=== Air Defense Force ===
Polish Air Defense Force, 1985

Air Defense Force Headquarters - Warsaw

1st Air Defense Corps - Warsaw

- 1st Air Defense Fighter Regiment - Mińsk Mazowiecki
- 10th Air Defense Fighter Regiment - Łask
- 3rd Air Defense Surface-to-Air Missile Brigade - Warsaw
- 1st Air Defense Radiotechnical Brigade - Warsaw

2nd Air Defense Corps - Bydgoszcz

- 26th Air Defense Fighter Regiment - Zegrze Pomorskie
- 28th Air Defense Fighter Regiment - Słupsk
- 34th Air Defense Fighter Regiment - Babie Doły
- 4th Air Defense Surface-to-Air Missile Brigade - Gdynia
- 26th Air Defense Surface-to-Air Missile Brigade - Gryfice
- 2nd Air Defense Radiotechnical Brigade - Bydgoszcz

3rd Air Defense Corps - Wrocław

- 11th Air Defense Fighter Regiment - Wrocław
- 39th Air Defense Fighter Regiment - Mierzęcice
- 62nd Air Defense Fighter Regiment - Poznań-Krzesiny
- 1st Air Defense Surface-to-Air Missile Brigade - Bytom
- 79th Air Defense Anti-Aircraft Artillery Regiment - Poznań
- 3rd Air Defense Radiotechnical Brigade - Wrocław

=== Territorial Army ===
Polish Territorial Defense Forces

- TDF Headquarters (Warsaw)

==== Internal Defense Forces of the Ministry of National Defense ====
- IDF Units under the National Defense Commission and the State Committee for Territorial Defense
  - 1st IDF Brigade - Góra Kalwaria
  - 2nd IDF Brigade
  - 5th IDF Brigade
  - 14th IDF Brigade
  - 8th IDF Regiment
  - 20th IDF Logistics Brigade - Kielce
  - 2nd IDF Signals Regiment
- Ground defense units of the IDF
  - 3rd IDF Regiment - Lublin
  - 13th IDF Regiment - Gdańsk
  - 15th IDF Regiment - Prudnik
  - 10th IDF Regiment
- IDF Pontoon Units
- IDF Engineering and Rescue units
  - 2nd IDF Engineering and Rescue Battalion
  - 4th IDF Engineering and Rescue Battalion
  - 6th IDF Engineering and Rescue Battalion

==== Territorial Defense Forces of the Ministry of National Defense ====
- TDF Engineering Battalions
- IDF Area Defense Battalions

=== Formations outside the regular armed forces but are wartime attached ===
The following organizations formed the wartime auxiliary to the Armed Forces in times of war.

- Milicja Obywatelska
- Border Protection Troops
- Vistula Military Corps of the Ministry of Interior and Administration
- Straż Marszałkowska

== Sources ==
- Czesław Grzelak, Henryk Stańczyk, and Stefan Zwoliński, Armia Berlinga i Żymierskiego, Warsaw: Wydawnictwo Neriton, 2002. ISBN 83-88973-27-4.
- Andy Johnson, Warsaw Pact Order of Battle, June 1989. On-line here
- Jerzy Kajetanowicz, Wojsko Polskie w Układzie Warszawskim 1955-1985, 7 November 2009. On-line here
