= 14th Anti-Tank Artillery Regiment (Poland) =

14th Anti-Tank Artillery Regiment named for Józef Piłsudski
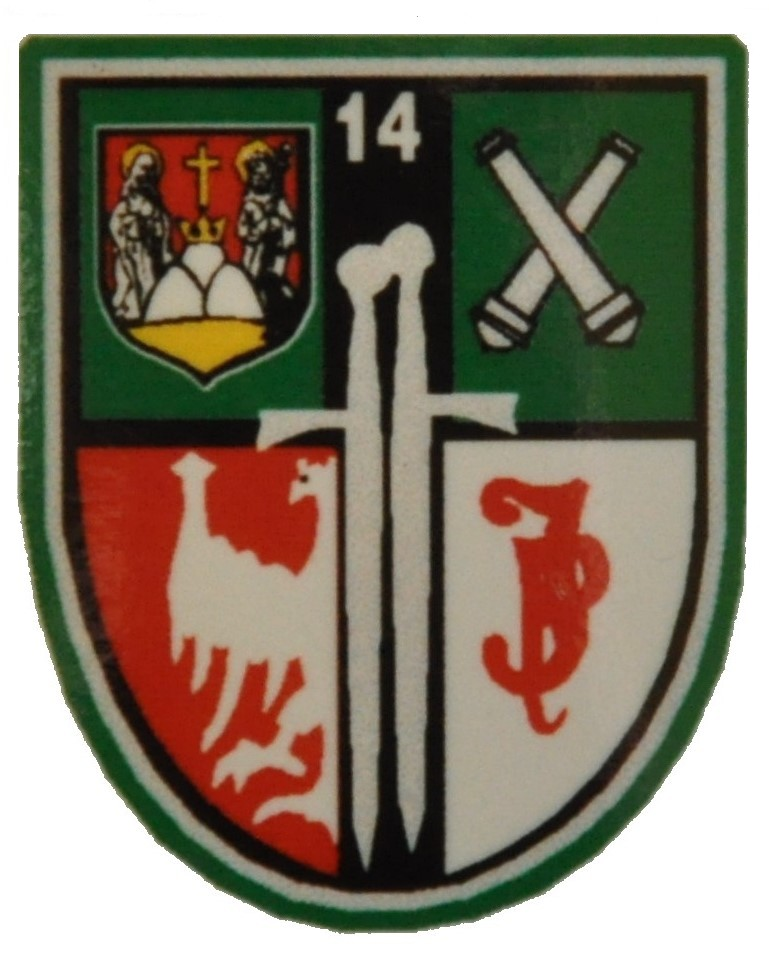
- Regimental insignia 1995-2005
- Active: 1967–2010; 2019-onwards
- Country: Poland
- Branch: Polish Land Forces
- Type: Rocket Forces and Artillery

The 14th Suwałki Anti-Tank Artillery Regiment named for Józef Piłsudski is a unit of the Rocket Forces and Artillery (pl:Wojska rakietowe i artyleria) of the Polish Army. The regiment is equipped with the BRDM-2/Malyutka anti-tank missile/armoured car system.

It is located at Suwałki. It was subordinated to the 16 DZ (2007-2010); the 11th Masurian Artillery Regiment (2011-2019); and the Armed Forces General Command from 2019.

== History ==
In August 1951, the 101st Anti-Tank Artillery Regiment was formed at Kwidzyn. On October 20, 1957, by a resolution of the State Council, the regiment received its banner. From 1967, the regiment became part of the 22nd Anti-Tank Artillery Brigade, which was disbanded by the Order of the Minister of National Defense No. 25 of September this year, while the 101st Regiment was renamed the 14th Anti-Tank Artillery Regiment and subordinated to the Commander of the Pomeranian Military District.

In the spring of 1994, the regiment was transferred from Kwidzyn to Suwałki. Here the regiment received a new banner.

In July 1999 the regiment was transferred from the 15th Warmian-Masurian Mechanized Division to the 1st Warsaw Mechanised Division.

As a result of the reorganization of the Armed Forces in October 2001, the regiment became part of the 1st Mechanized Corps in Bydgoszcz. Another change of subordination took place in November 2003, as a result of which the regiment was subordinated to the Commanders of the Land Forces. From January 11, 2007, to December 31, 2010, the regiment was within the structures of the 16th Pomeranian Mechanized Division "King Kazimierz Jagiellończyk".

The 14th Anti-Tank Regiment was stationed in the Suwałki Garrison. The regiment celebrates its holiday on September 10.

By order of the commander of the 16th Mechanized Division on August 11, 2010, the regiment was transformed into the 14th anti-tank artillery squadron. The squadron became part of the 11th Masurian Artillery Regiment "General Józef Bem" (pl:11 Mazurski Pułk Artylerii).

On September 30, 2019, the Suwałki squadron was formally transformed into the 14th Anti-Tank Artillery Regiment "Marshal Józef Piłsudski". By order of the Minister of National Defence, the 14th Suwałki anti-tank artillery squadron was removed from the Węgorzewo regiment, transformed into the 14th Suwałki anti-tank artillery regiment and subordinated to the Commander of the Armed Forces.
