= Military districts of Vietnam =

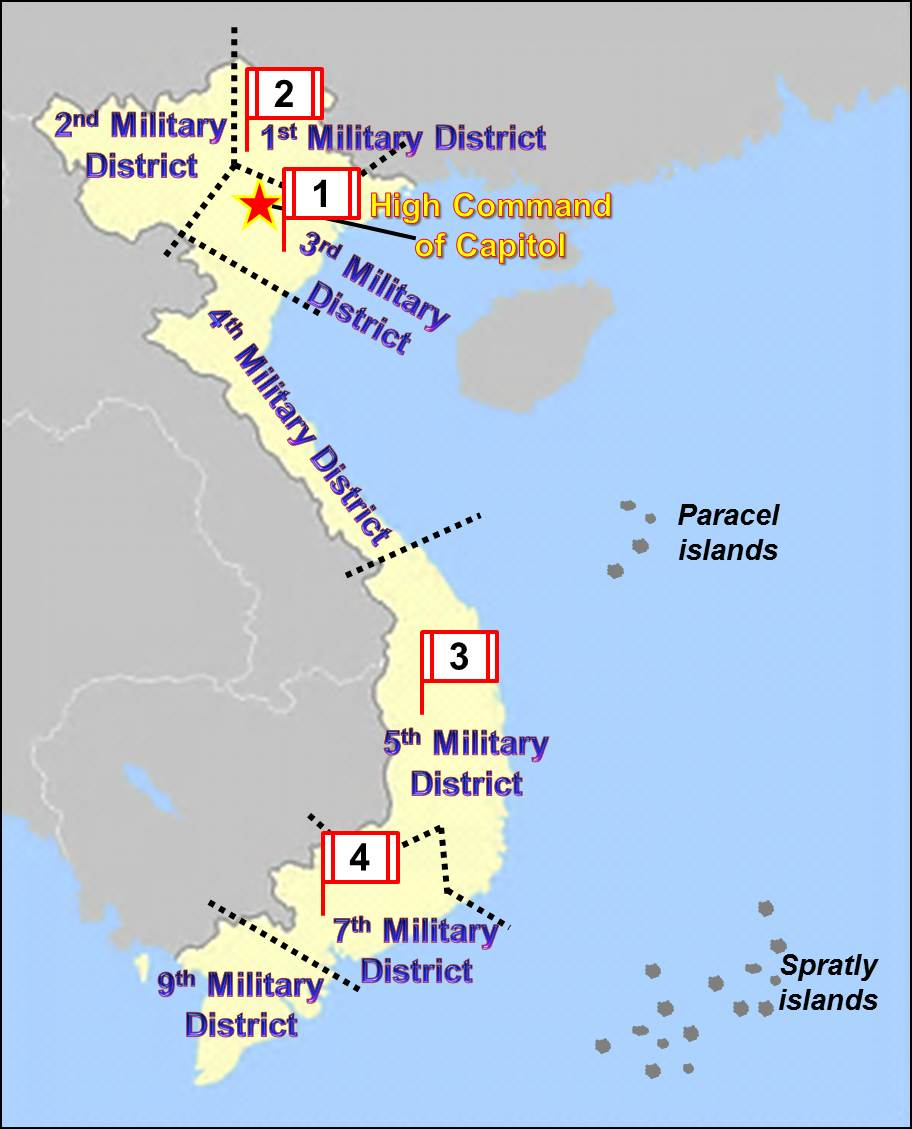
Map of military regions in Vietnam

The Vietnam People's Army has the following military regions:

- High Command of Capital Hanoi: It is directly under the Ministry of Defense of Vietnam; tasked to organize, build, manage and command armed forces defending the capital. The headquarters is in Hanoi.
- 1st Military Region: It is directly under the Ministry of Defense of Vietnam; tasked to protect against foreign invaders; and to organize, build, manage and command forces in northeastern Vietnam. The headquarters is in Thai Nguyen.
- 2nd Military Region: It is directly under the Ministry of Defense of Vietnam; tasked to organize, build, manage and command armed forces defending northwestern Vietnam. The headquarters is in Viet Tri.
- 3rd Military Region: It is directly under the Ministry of Defense of Vietnam; tasked to organize, build, manage and command armed forces defending the Red River Delta area. The headquarters is in Hai Phong.
- 4th Military Region: It is directly under the Ministry of Defense of Vietnam; tasked to organize, build, manage and command armed forces defending north central Vietnam. The headquarters is in Vinh.
- 5th Military Region: It is directly under the Ministry of Defense of Vietnam; tasked to organize, build, manage and command armed forces defending south central Vietnam, including the western highlands and south central coastal provinces. The headquarters is in Da Nang.
- 7th Military Region: It is directly under the Ministry of Defense of Vietnam; tasked to organize, build, manage and command armed forces defending southeastern Vietnam. The headquarters is in Ho Chi Minh City.
- 9th Military Region: It is directly under the Ministry of Defense of Vietnam; tasked to organize, build, manage and command armed forces defending the Mekong Delta. The headquarters is in Cần Thơ
