= Polish Land Forces =

Ground warfare branch of Poland's military forces

Land Forces
- Wojska Lądowe
- Military eagle
- Founded: 1918; 108 years ago
- Country: Poland
- Type: Ground forces
- Size: 110,000 (2025)
- Part of: Polish Armed Forces
- Headquarters: Warsaw
- March: "Marsz Pierwszej Brygady" (English: "March of the First Brigade")
- Engagements: Polish–Ukrainian War; Polish–Czechoslovak War; Polish–Soviet War; Polish–Lithuanian War; World War II: Invasion of Poland; Western Front; Eastern Front; War on terror: Invasion of Iraq; War in Afghanistan

Commanders
- Commander-in-Chief: Karol Nawrocki
- Minister of National Defence: Władysław Kosiniak-Kamysz
- Chief of the General Staff: General Wiesław Kukuła
- General Commander: Lieutenant General Marek Sokolowski
- Operational Command: Major General Maciej Klisz
- Inspector of the Land Forces: Major General Piotr Trytek

Insignia
- Flag

- Banner of the Commander in Chief

The Land Forces (Polish: Wojska Lądowe [ˈvɔjska lɔ̃ˈdɔvɛ]) are the ground forces of the Polish Armed Forces. They currently contain some 110,000 active personnel and form many components of the European Union and NATO deployments around the world. Poland's recorded military history stretches back a millennium – since the 10th century (see List of Polish wars and History of the Polish Army). Poland's modern army was formed after Poland regained independence following World War I in 1918.

The current Inspector of the Land Forces is Major General Piotr Trytek.

== History ==
=== 1918–1938 ===
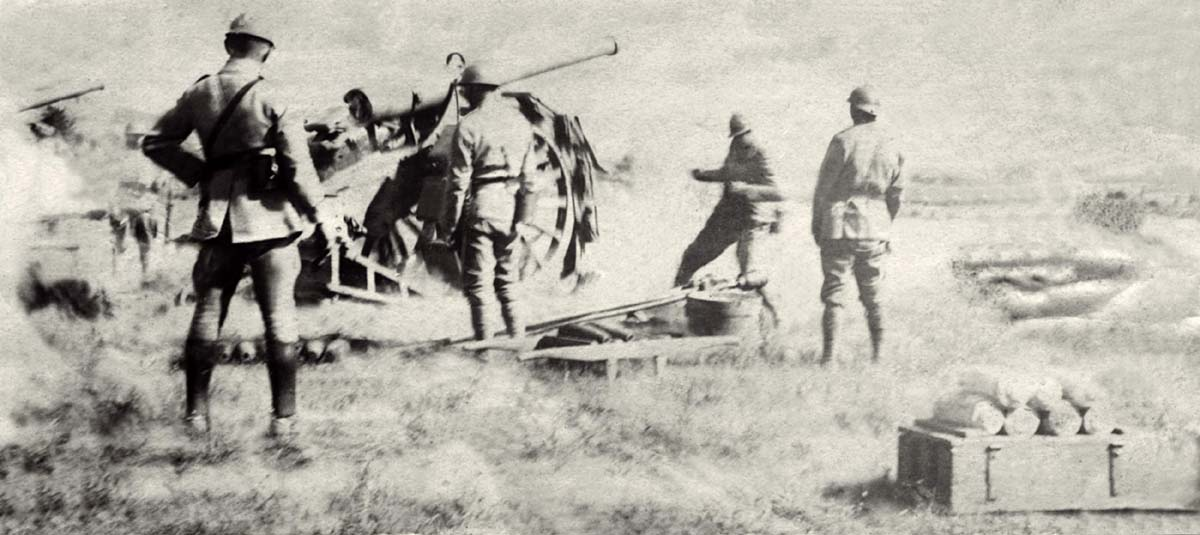
Polish 120 mm battery during the Battle of Warsaw; Polish–Soviet War, August 1920

When Poland regained independence in 1918, it recreated its military which participated in the Polish–Soviet War of 1919–1921, and in the two smaller conflicts ( Polish–Ukrainian War (1918–1919) and the Polish–Lithuanian War (1919–1920)).

Initially, right after the First World War, Poland had five military districts (1918–1921):

- Poznań Military District (Poznański Okręg Wojskowy), HQ in Poznań
- Kraków Military District (Krakowski Okręg Wojskowy), HQ in Kraków
- Łódź Military District (Łódzki Okręg Wojskowy), HQ in Łódź
- Warsaw Military District (Warszawski Okręg Wojskowy), HQ in Warsaw
- Lublin Military District (Lubelski Okręg Wojskowy), HQ in Lublin.

The Polish Land Forces as readied for the Polish–Soviet War was made up of soldiers who had formerly served in the various partitioning empires, supported by some international volunteers. There appear to have been a total of around thirty Polish divisions involved. Boris Savinkov was at the head of an army of 20,000 to 30,000 largely Russian POWs, and was accompanied by Dmitry Merezhkovsky and Zinaida Gippius. The Polish forces grew from approximately 100,000 in 1918 to over 500,000 in early 1920.

In August 1920, the Polish army had reached a total strength of 737,767 people. Half of that was on the frontline. Given Soviet losses, there was rough numerical parity between the two armies. By the time of the Battle of Warsaw Poles might have even had a slight advantage in numbers and logistics.

Among the major formations involved on the Polish side were a number of Fronts, including the Lithuanian-Belarusian Front, and about seven armies, including the First Polish Army.

=== 1939–1945 ===
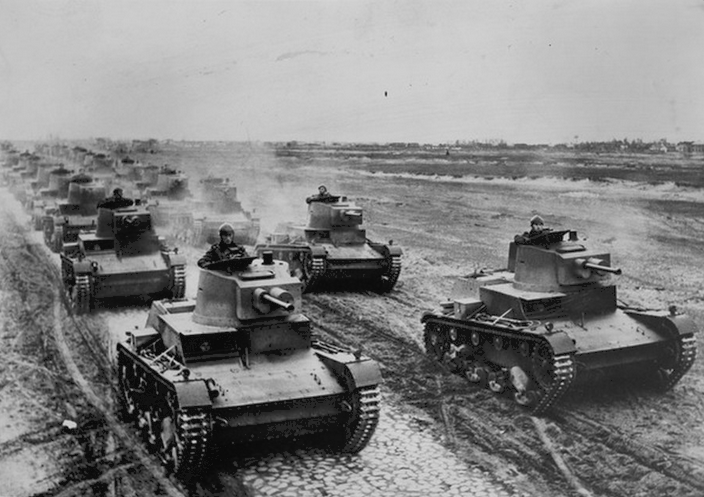
Polish army's 7TP tanks on military manoeuvres before the Invasion of Poland by Nazi Germany, 1939.

The German invasion of Poland began on 1 September 1939. The Wehrmacht seized half of Poland quickly despite heavy Polish resistance. Among the erroneous myths generated by this campaign were accounts of Polish cavalry charging German tanks, which did not, in fact, take place. In the east, the Red Army took the other half of the country in accordance with the Nazi-Soviet Pact. Following the country's fall, Polish soldiers began regrouping in what was to become the Polish Army in France.

Both the Polish Armed Forces in the West and the Polish Armed Forces in the East, as well as interior (partisan) forces, primarily represented by the Home Army (AK) had land forces during the Second World War. While the forces fighting under the Allied banner were supported by the Polish Air Force and Navy, the partisan forces were an exclusively land formation.

The army operational today has its roots in the surrogate force formed in support of Soviet interests during the establishment of the People's Republic of Poland after the Second World War. Two Polish armies, the First Army (Poland) and the Second Army fought with the Red Army on the Eastern Front, supported by some Polish Air Force elements. The formation of a Third Army had begun but was not completed.

=== 1945–1989 ===
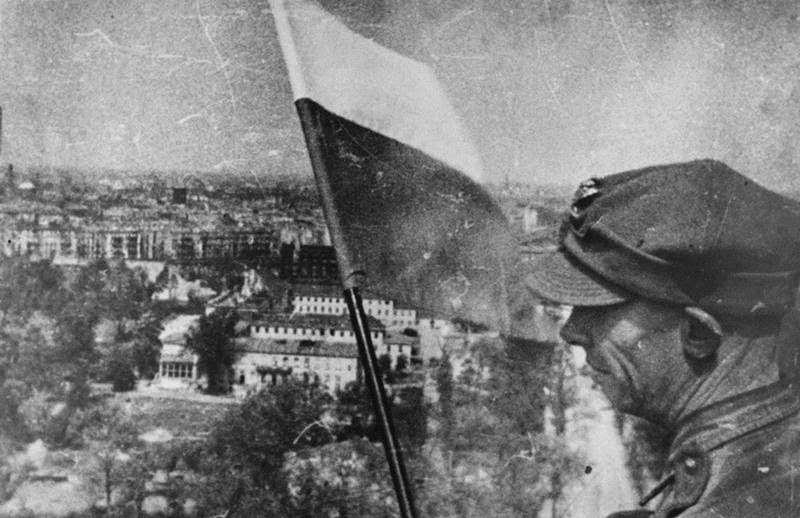
Polish flag raised over Berlin on the Victory Column; World War II, 2 May 1945

The end of the war found the Polish Army in the midst of intense organisational development. Although the implementation of the Polish Front concept was abandoned, new tactical units and troop types were created. As a result of mobilisation, troop numbers in May 1945 reached 370,000 soldiers, and in September 1945 there were 440,000. Military districts were organised in liberated areas. The districts exercised direct authority over the units stationed on the territory administered by them.

Returning to Poland, the Second Army was tasked with the protection of the western border of the state from Jelenia Gora to Kamien Pomorski, and on the basis of its headquarters, the staff of the Poznan Military District was created at Poznań. The southern border, from Jelenia Gora to the Użok railway station (at the junction of the Polish, the Soviet and the Czechoslovak borders) was occupied by the First Army. Its headquarters staff formed the basis of the Silesian Military District.

In mid-1945, after the end of World War II, the Polish Army, as part of the overall armed forces, the People's Army of Poland, was divided into six (later seven) districts. These were the Warsaw Military District, HQ in Warsaw, the Lublin Military District, HQ in Lublin, the Kraków Military District, HQ in Kraków, the Lodz Military District, HQ in Lodz, the Poznan Military District, HQ in Poznan, the Pomeranian Military District, HQ in Torun (formed from the staff of the short-lived LWP 1st Army Corps) and the Silesian Military District, HQ in Katowice, created in the fall of 1945.

In June 1945 the 1st, 3rd and 8th Infantry Divisions were assigned internal security duties. The 4th Infantry Division was reorganised for the purpose of creating the Internal Security Corps (KBW). The rule was that military units were used primarily against the Ukrainian Insurgent Army (UPA), while the Internal Security Corps was used to fight the armed underground independence.

Often however army units fought the underground resistance, and vice versa. The culmination of the UPA suppression operation was the so-called 'Wisła Action' (Operation Vistula) which took place in 1947. At the same time demobilisation took place, moving the armed forces to a peacetime footing. On 10 August 1945 a "decree of the partial demobilisation" of the armed forces was issued. The next demobilisation phases took place in February and December 1946.

One of the most important tasks facing the army after the war was mine clearance. Between 1944 and 1956 the demining operation involved 44 engineering units or about 19,000 sappers. They cleared mines and other munitions in a clearance area of more than 250,000 square kilometers (80% of the country). 14.75 million munitions of various types and 59 million bullets, bombs and other ammunition were found and removed. The mining operations cost the lives of 646 sappers.

In 1949 the military districts were reduced to four. They were the Pomeranian Military District, HQ in Bydgoszcz, the Silesian Military District, HQ in Wroclaw, the Warsaw Military District, HQ in Warsaw, and the Kraków Military District with its headquarters in Kraków. In November 1953, the Kraków Military District was dissolved and until 1992, Poland was divided into three districts.

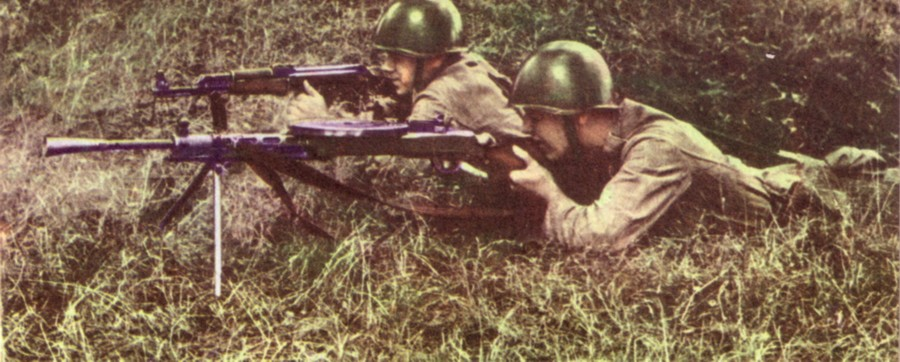
Soldier of the Polish People's Army firing a DP light machine gun

Following victory and the movement of Polish borders these troops and other Polish soldiers thought loyal to their Soviet overlords were built up into a force which was to form part of the Warsaw Pact. Polish Army troops would have formed part of the second strategic echelon deployed for an attack on NATO's Allied Forces Central Europe.

A Polish Front headquarters was formed in 1958, along with three armies formed from 1955, the First Polish Army, the Second Army, and the Fourth Army, mobilisation-only headquarters that were to be formed within the three districts.

The Polish Front headquarters was deactivated in 1990, and the three-army mobilisation scheme was likewise abandoned. Polish land forces during the communist era included troops dedicated to internal security – the Territorial Defence Forces – and control of the country's borders.

Until the fall of communism the army's prestige continued to fall, as it was used by the communist government to violently suppress several outbursts of protest, including the Poznań 1956 protests, the Polish 1970 protests, and protests during Martial law in Poland in 1981–1982. Troops of the Silesian Military District also took part in the suppressing of the 1968 democratisation process of Czechoslovakia, commonly known as the Prague Spring.

In 1989 the Pomeranian Military District controlled the 8th, 12th, 15th, 16th, and 20th Divisions, the Silesian Military District controlled the 2nd, 4th, 5th, 10th, and 11th Divisions, and the Warsaw Military District the 1st, 3rd, and 9th Divisions, plus the 6th Airborne Division earmarked for Front control. The 7th Sea Landing Division was based within the Pomeranian Military District but probably earmarked for front control. The two districts facing Germany each controlled four divisions in 1990, which had been recently reorganised, in line with the late 1990s Soviet defensive doctrine, from a 3:1 mix of motor rifle : tank regiments into a 2:2 mix of motor rifle and tank regiments.

The Warsaw Military District in the east controlled only the 1st Mechanised Division. Two other mechanised divisions in that district had been disbanded in 1988. There was also the 6th Airborne Division and the 7th Sea Landing Division, possibly intended to form part of a Warsaw Pact attack on Denmark, to open the Baltic straits to the North Sea and beyond. There were 205,000 personnel, of which 168,000 were conscripts.

=== Since 1989 ===
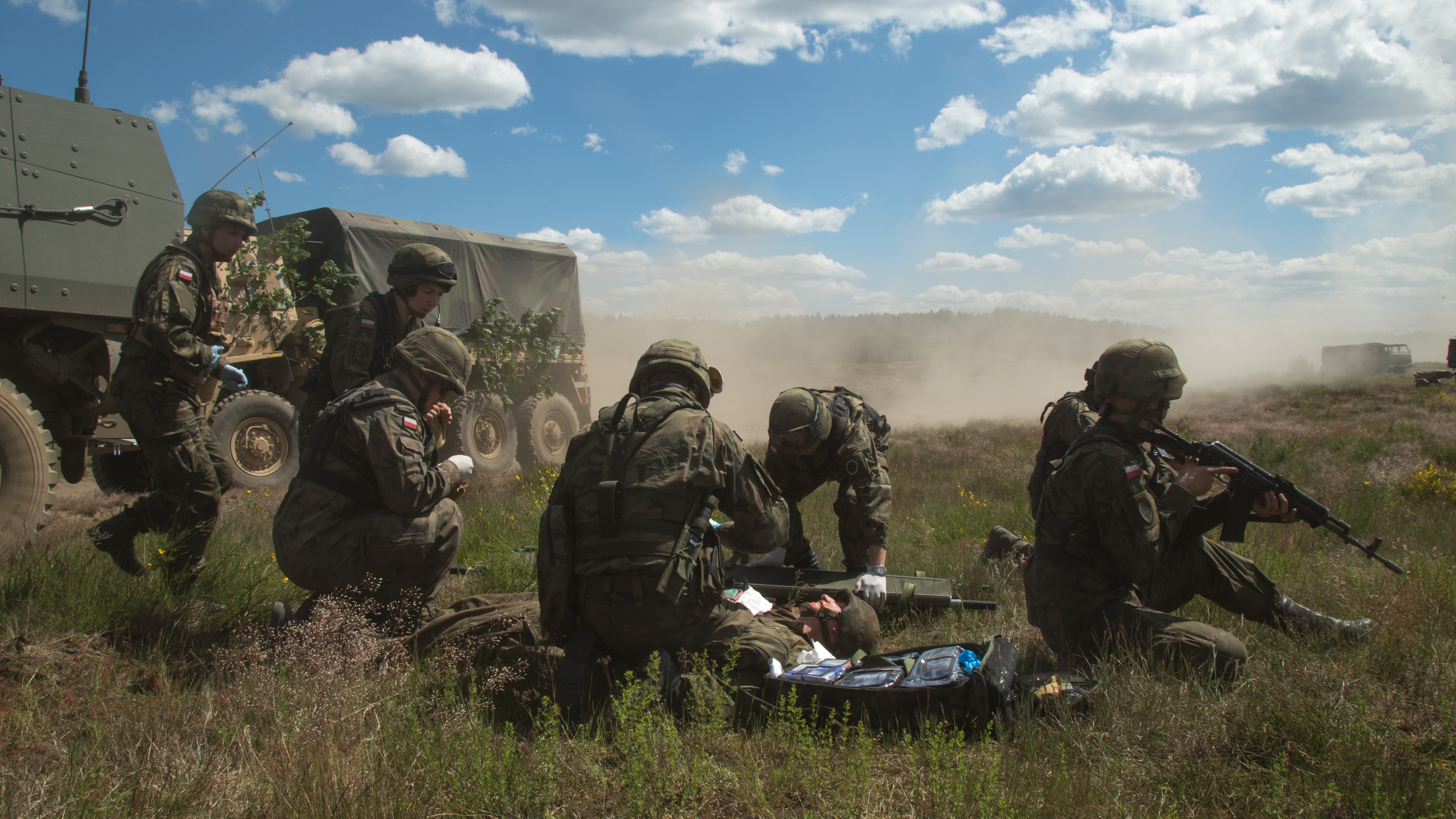
Polish soldiers during Anakonda 2016 exercises

Following the end of the Cold War the Land Forces were drastically reduced and reorganised.

In 1992, the Kraków Military District was recreated. From nine divisions, the total was planned in 2001 to fall to four, plus six independent brigades. Since 1 January 1999, Poland has been divided into two military districts. These are the Pomeranian Military District (Pomorski Okręg Wojskowy) with HQ in Bydgoszcz, covering northern Poland, and the Silesian Military District (Śląski Okręg Wojskowy) with HQ in Wrocław, covering southern Poland.

From that date the former Krakow Military District became the headquarters of the Air-Mechanized Corps, which later became the headquarters of the 2nd Mechanised Corps. On 1 September 2011 the 1st Warsaw Mechanised Division was disbanded.

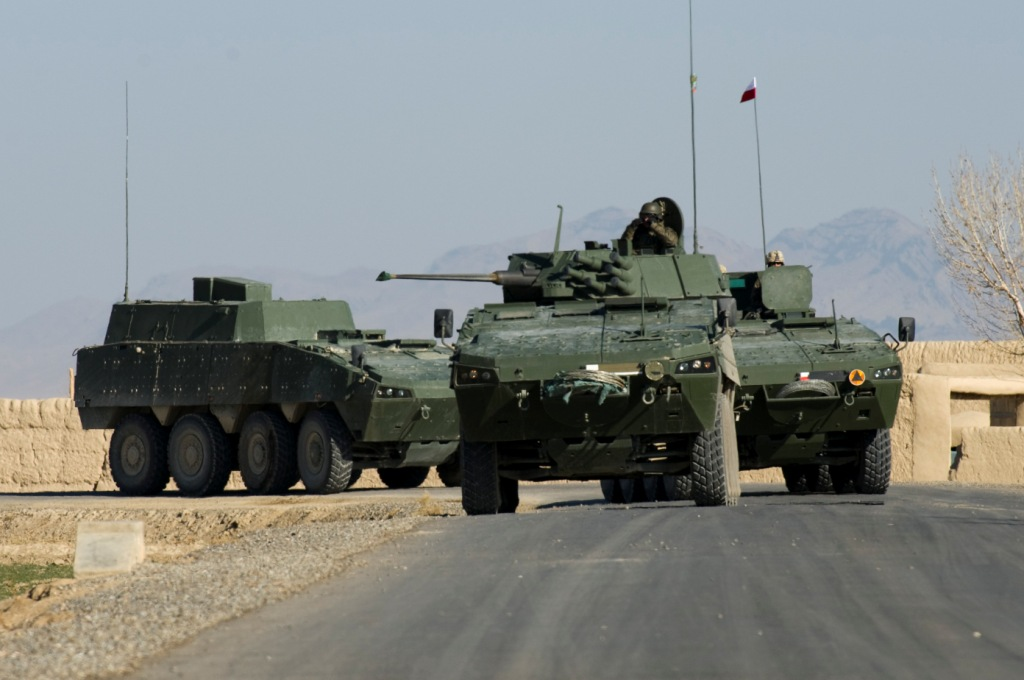
A Polish Military Contingent in Afghanistan - KTO Rosomak

General Edward Pietrzyk served as commander of the Polish Land Forces from 2000 to September 2006. He was succeeded by General Waldemar Skrzypczak (2006–2009).

In May 2014, Defence Minister Tomasz Siemoniak announced plans for the future acquisition of attack helicopters in response to the Russo-Ukrainian war. On 25 November 2015, chief of National Defence Commission Michał Jach, indicated the necessity to increase the number of Polish troops from 100,000 to 150,000. However, Jach stressed that the process was complicated and should not be rushed.

On 17 June 2022, after the Russian invasion of Ukraine in 2022 and the increase of the Polish armed forces to 300,000. the formation of two new mechanized divisions was announced.

== Participation in peacekeeping operations ==
From the 1950s the Polish Land Forces have contributed troops to peacekeeping operations, initially the Neutral Nations Supervisory Commission in Korea. Poland contributed troops to the UNIFIL mission in Lebanon between 1982 and 2009. Poland sent a divisional headquarters and a brigade to Iraq after the 2003 Iraq war. Poland sent ten rotations of troops, manning a significant portion of Multinational Division Central-South. At its peak Poland, had 2,500 soldiers in the south of Iraq.

Poland deployed about ten attack and transport helicopters as part of its force in Iraq between 2004 and 2008. These helicopters formed the Independent Air Assault Group (pl:Samodzielna Grupa Powietrzno-Szturmowa). The division was disbanded in 2008. A Polish Military Advisory Liaison Team (MALT) stayed in Iraq until at least 2011 (see pl:PKW Irak).

One of the most recent peace keeping missions was MINURCAT in Chad and the Central African Republic, where Poland despatched troops from 2007 to 2010. Among the deployed troops were two Reconnaissance companies, a Military Gendarmerie unit, a component of the 10th Logistics Brigade, elements of the 5th Military Engineers Regiment, and three Mil Mi-17 helicopters.

== Equipment and modernization ==
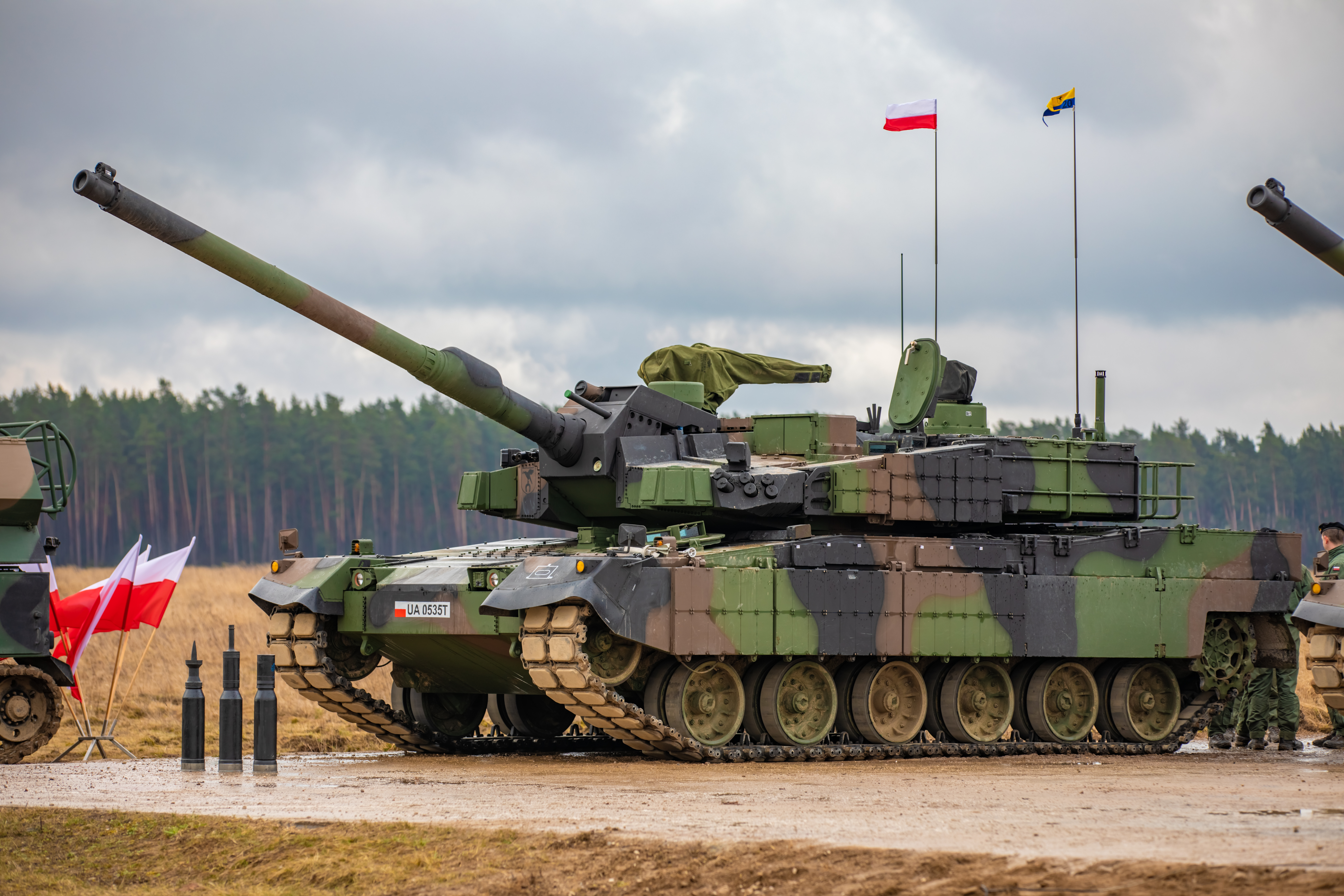
A Polish K2

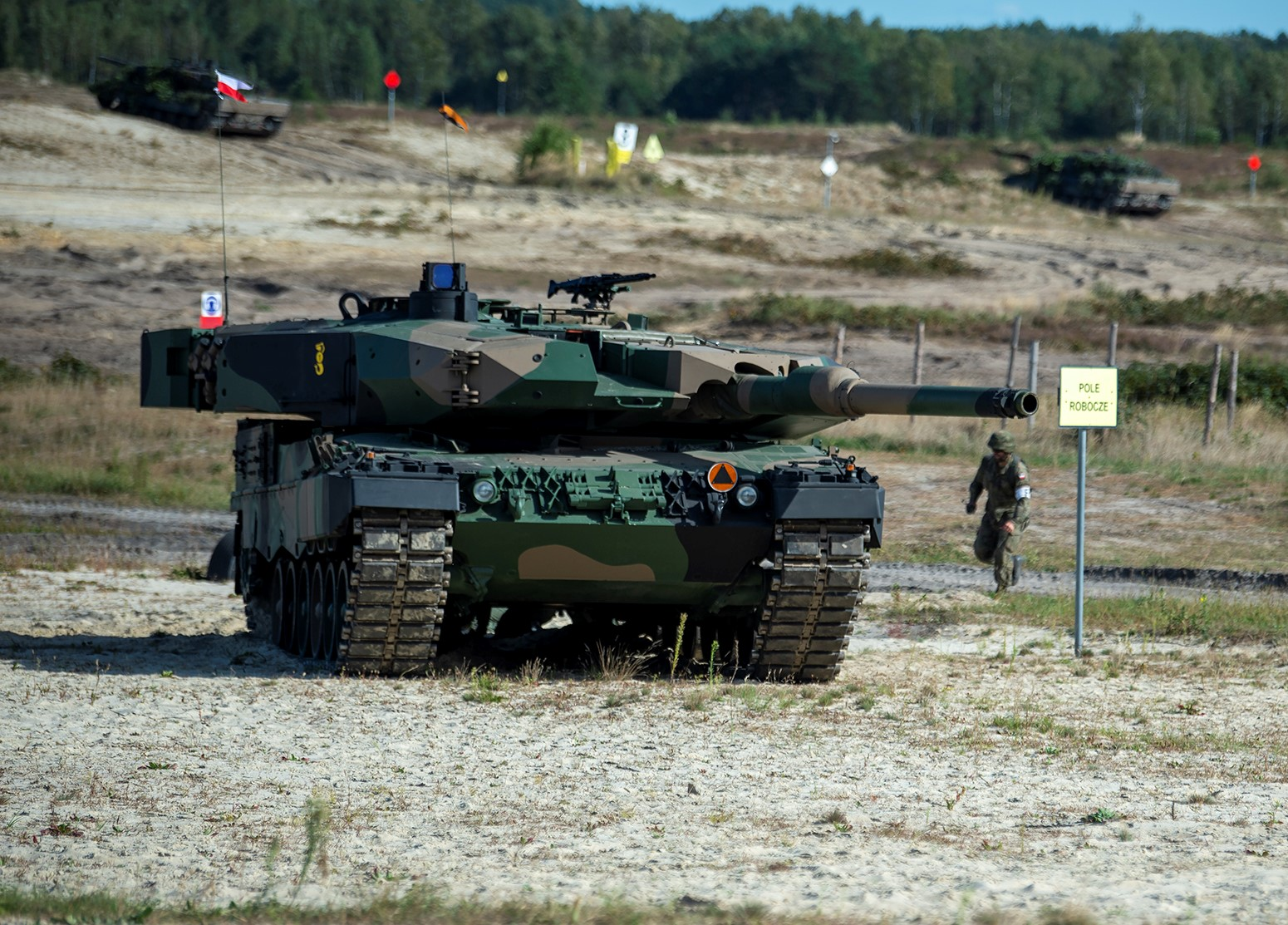
A Leopard 2PL

In 2019 a new long-term program designed to modernize the Polish Armed Forces was introduced. Over the period of the next 10 to 14 years a large portion of the equipment currently being used by the Polish Army will be either upgraded or replaced. Some elements of this program are already in place. The Polish Ministry of Defence signed a contract aiming at modernization of all Leopard 2 main battle tanks used by the Polish Army to the Leopard 2PL standard. The completion of this program is planned to take place prior to 2023. The first Leopard 2PL arrived in March 2018.

The Polish Army has 1,009 tanks (2017) including 249 Leopard 2 tanks (117 Leopard 2A4, 105 Leopard 2A5, 25 Leopard 2PL, 2 Leopard 2NJ), 232 PT-91 tanks, that underwent modernization in 2016, and 328 T-72 tanks. 230 of the T-72s are being upgraded by the Bumar-Łabędy arms manufacturing plant. Improvements include: installation of new radio communication systems, digital engine control and start-up system, third generation thermal imaging cameras, external transport baskets, and any necessary overhauls and repairs that can improve their longevity and combat ability on the modern battlefield.

Following Russia's invasion of Ukraine in February 2022, Poland has donated over 200 T-72 tanks to Ukraine's army, along with dozens of other armored vehicles. As a result of the invasion, the Polish government has expedited the process of modernization of the military equipment. In July 2022, Poland signed a contract to acquire 1000 K2 Black Panther tanks and 460 K9 Thunder howitzers from South Korea for (the cost for the latter was US$2.4 billion). The first batch of K2 tanks and K9 howitzers was delivered in December 2022. Further deliveries are scheduled for 2023-2026 period.

Looking towards the future, the 'Wilk' procurement program envisions the acquisition of up to 500 new tanks. Some of the T-72s and PT-91s will be replaced by M1A2 Abrams SEPv3 main battle tanks (separate from the Wilk program) after Poland signed a contract to purchase 250 Abrams M1A2 SEPv3 tanks (plus ammunition, spare parts, training, and logistical vehicles) on 6 April 2022.

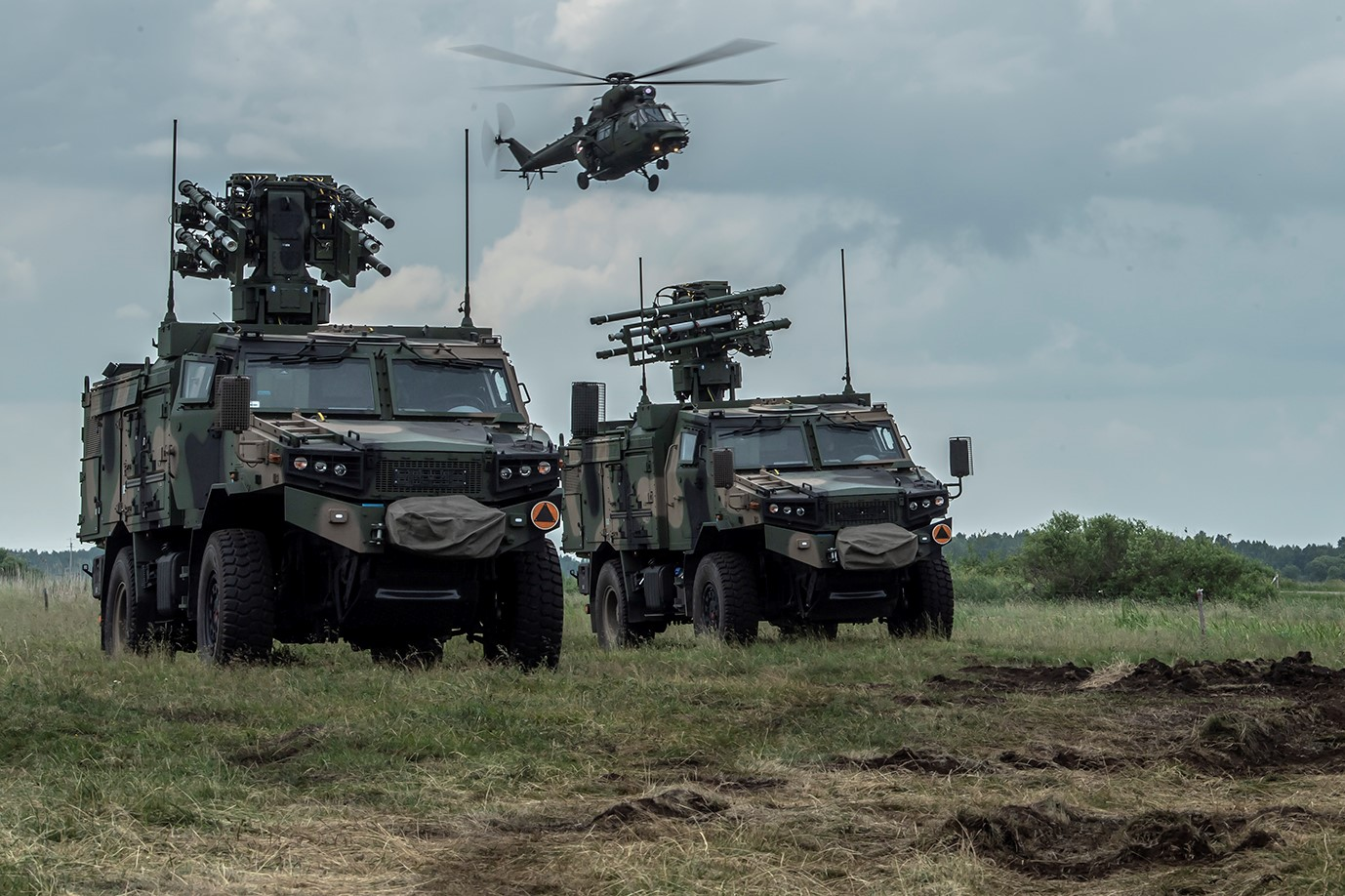
A Poprad Anti-Air missile system

For air and missile defense, acquisitions of Poprad Anti-Air missile systems - which covers very short range air defense (VSHORAD) - are in their final stages. Legacy systems will be replaced through the Wisla and Narew procurement programs. The Wisla program will procure medium range air defense platforms and is being fulfilled through the acquisition of 2 Patriot air and missile defense batteries integrated with IBCS (delivery scheduled for late 2022), with plans to order six further batteries. The Narew program covers short range air defense (SHORAD) and is in its final stages of design selection and contract assignment. Considerable involvement of Polish defense contractors is being planned. After the invasion of Ukraine, Poland ordered 1 battery of the Common Anti-Air Modular Missile (CAMM) short-range air defense system from the UK as a short-term stop-gap, with plans to eventually acquire 23 batteries for the NAREW program.

The Polish army has 863 new KTO Rosomak multi-role wheeled armored personnel carriers. They will be combined with new BWP Borsuk infantry fighting vehicle. The gradual replacement of older BWP-1 with this particular new design is to start from 2023 onward (prototypes are currently being tested).

New rifles (FB MSBS Grot) and pistols (Vis-100) are being brought into service to supplement current FB Beryl rifles as well as to replace FB P-83 Wanad pistols and AKM rifles. A new Individual Warfare System "Tytan" (Titan) is being developed to integrate combat systems designed for individual soldiers and includes a personal computer, new protective uniform, modular body armor, night vision devices, advanced communication system, etc.

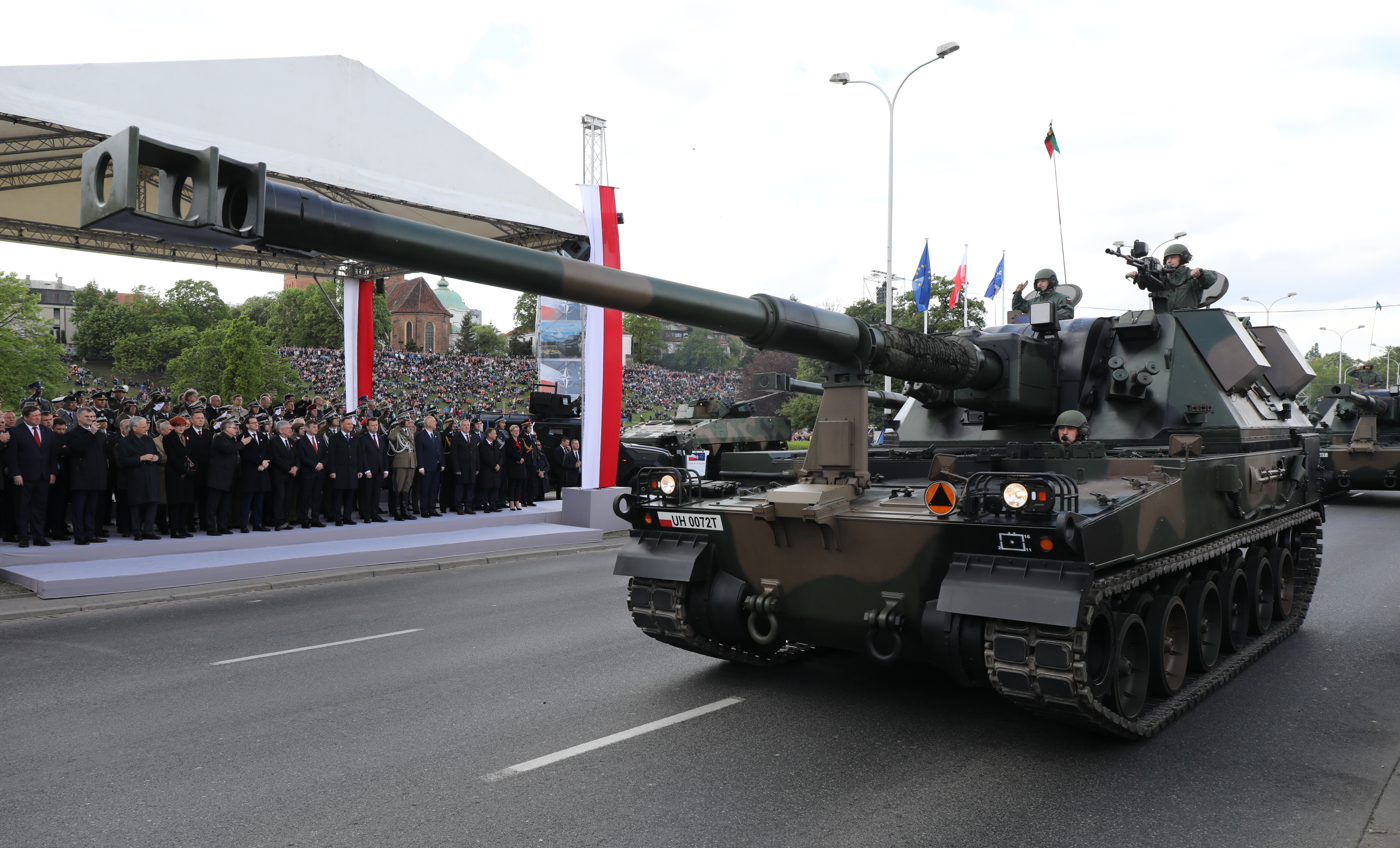
An AHS Krab

To modernize its artillery, Poland has purchased several systems including the WR-40 Langusta rocket launchers equipped with state-of-the-art Topaz fire control. In 2019 the Ministry of Military Affairs ordered 20 M142 HIMARS launchers plus support vehicles. 122 new self-propelled NATO-compatible tracked AHS Krab gun-howitzers will replace the 2S1 Goździk, and new wheeled AHS Kryl howitzers will replace the wz. 1977 Dana. Deliveries of 122 M120 Rak mortars have been ongoing since 2017, plus 60 command vehicles (based on the KTO Rosomak fighting platform) and support vehicles. New reconnaissance vehicles, the Rosomak WRT, began entering into service after 2016.

== Rank insignia ==
Officers

NATO code	OF-10	OF-9	OF-8	OF-7	OF-6	OF-5	OF-4	OF-3	OF-2	OF-1
Polish Land Forces
Polish Land Forces	Marszałek Polski	Generał	Generał broni	Generał dywizji	Generał brygady	Pułkownik	Podpułkownik	Major	Kapitan	Porucznik	Podporucznik

Other ranks

NATO code	OR-9		OR-8	OR-7	OR-6	OR-5	OR-4	OR-3		OR-2	OR-1
Polish Land Forces
Polish Land Forces	Starszy chorąży sztabowy	Starszy chorąży	Chorąży		Młodszy chorąży	Starszy sierżant	Sierżant	Plutonowy	Starszy kapral	Kapral	Starszy szeregowy	Szeregowy

== Organization ==
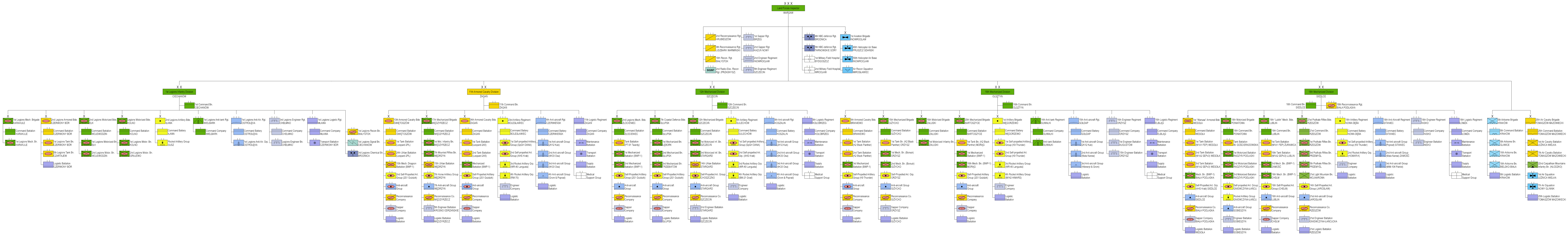
Polish Land Forces organisation as of November 2025

A map of Polish military units

=== Formations ===
Poland has inherited the considerable Polish People's Army designed to fight on the Soviet Union's side in a potential massive full-scale conflict with NATO. The military posture was completely directed westwards with the Pomeranian Military District (Pomorski Okręg Wojskowy) and the Silesian Military District (Śląski Okręg Wojskowy) taking a front line role and the Warsaw Military District (Warszawski Okręg Wojskowy) organised behind them and taking more of a support and reinforcement role. A strong Soviet component of the Northern Group of Forces was also stationed on the territory of the Polish People's Republic. The collapse of the Warsaw Pact and the Socialist block in general has caused a geo-politic uncertainty, so the Polish military has started a gradual reduction of its forces and also reform of its defensive structure. The main feature was the introduction of a fourth MD - the Cracow Military District (Krakowski Okręg Wojskowy) in 1992. The new concept envisioned defence on each direction, providing two military districts facing an invasion and the other two providing rear security, support and reinforcements.

The stable geopolitical situation in Central Europe and the subsequent accession of Poland into NATO made possible the further disbandment of divisions and brigades. This enabled the increase of the tank, mechanised and motorised battalions from three to four line companies with an increase of their combat platforms to 58 vehicles (four companies of 14 vehicles: three four-vehicle platoons plus two vehicles in the company command and two additional vehicles in the battalion command).

The increased uncertainty in the region with the Russian annexation of the Crimea and Luhansk and Donetsk oblasts from Ukraine in 2014 and especially the Russian invasion in Ukraine in 2022 have motivated the Polish government for a rapid military build-up programme calling for massive investments and fielding of new divisions and brigades. These ambitions plans face constrains mostly with the time it takes for the new weapons systems to be manufactured and delivered. Reportedly the Polish Land Forces are exploring the reduction of combat battalions from four line companies and total strength of 58 vehicles to three line companies and 44 vehicles in total.

Minister Błaszczak reiterated, that the future force structure of the Polish Land Forces will be built around "six well-armed divisions". Following a November 2023 decision from the Ministry of National Defence, the formation of a sixth army division (8th Infantry Division), based in Kielce started. It is expected to include two mechanized brigades, one motorized brigade, and one armoured brigade.

The current plans are for a force structure of six combined arms divisions and additional separate brigades. The combat brigades will each have four maneuver battalions. The four divisions in the east of the country (16th, 18th, 1st and 8th) will each have four combat brigades. The two divisions in the west of the country (11th and 12th) will retain their force structure of three combat brigades. The Law and Justice (PiS) Party has called for a seventh reserve division in its Secure Future for Poles program document on page 151, but these plans haven't been officially confirmed by the Polish government.

==== Divisions ====
- 1st Legions Infantry Division, in Warsaw (being formed and will move to Ciechanów)
  - 1st Legions Mechanized Brigade, in Karakule
  - 2nd Legions Armored Brigade, in Czerwony Bór
  - 2nd Legions Motorized Brigade, in Ełk (activated 12 November 2023)
  - Legions Mechanized Brigade, in Kolno
- 8th Infantry Division, in Kielce (being formed)
  - 8th Armored Brigade, in Mielec and Kolbuszowa
  - Mechanized Brigade, in Łaziska
  - Mechanized Brigade, in Raducz
  - Motorized Brigade, in Leszno
- 11th Armored Cavalry Division, in Żagań
  - 10th Armored Cavalry Brigade, in Świętoszów
  - 17th Mechanized Brigade, in Międzyrzecz
  - 34th Armored Cavalry Brigade, in Żagań
- 12th Mechanized Division, in Szczecin
  - 2nd Legions Mechanized Brigade, in Złocieniec-Budowo
  - 7th Coastal Defence Brigade, in Słupsk
  - 12th Mechanized Brigade, in Szczecin
- 16th Mechanized Division, in Elbląg
  - 9th Armored Cavalry Brigade, in Braniewo
  - 15th Mechanized Brigade, in Giżycko
  - 16th Motorized Brigade, in Załuski (activated 18 March 2024)
  - 20th Mechanized Brigade, in Bartoszyce
- 18th Mechanized Division, in Siedlce
  - 1st Armored Brigade, in Warsaw
  - 18th Motorized Brigade, in Poniatowa (activated 3 October 2023)
  - 19th Mechanized Brigade, in Lublin
  - 21st Podhale Rifles Brigade, in Rzeszów

==== Independent formations and units ====
- 1st Aviation Brigade, in Inowrocław
- 6th Airborne Brigade, in Kraków
- 25th Air Cavalry Brigade, in Tomaszów Mazowiecki
- 2nd Reconnaissance Regiment, in Hrubieszów
- 9th Reconnaissance Regiment, in Lidzbark Warmiński
- 18th Reconnaissance Regiment, in Białystok
- 1st Combat Engineer Regiment, in Brzeg
- 2nd Combat Engineer Regiment, in Kazuń Nowy
- 2nd Engineer Regiment, in Inowrocław
- 5th Engineer Regiment, in Szczecin
- 4th CBRN defense Regiment, in Brodnica
- 5th CBRN defense Regiment, in Tarnowskie Góry
- 2nd Radio-Electronic Reconnaissance Regiment, in Przasnysz

=== Arms of service ===
- Armored & Mechanized Forces (Wojska Pancerne i Zmechanizowane)
- Missile Forces and Field Artillery (Wojska Rakietowe i Artyleria)
- Air Defense Forces (Wojska Obrony Przeciwlotniczej)
- Air-mobile (Airborne) Forces (Wojska Aeromobilne)
- Polish Corps of Engineers (Wojska Inżynieryjne)
- Reconnaissance & Early Warning (Rozpoznanie i Wczesne Ostrzeganie)
- Signals & Information Technology Forces (Wojska Łączności i Informatyki)
- Chemical Forces (Wojska Chemiczne)
- Logistics and Support (Logistyka)

== See also ==
- List of Polish armoured fighting vehicles
- Podhale Rifles
- Territorial Defence Force (Poland)
- Mountain warfare
