= Military district =

Regional military unit size designation

Military districts (also called military regions) are formations of a state's armed forces (often of the Army) which are responsible for a certain area of territory. They are often more responsible for administrative than operational matters, and in countries with conscript forces, often handle parts of the conscription cycle.

Navies have also used a similar model, with organizations such as the United States naval districts. A number of navies in South America used naval districts at various points in time.

== By country ==
=== Algeria ===
Algeria is divided into six numbered military regions, each with headquarters located in a principal city or town (see People's National Army (Algeria)#Military regions). Before the Algerian revolution, French Algeria was the 10th Military Region of France.

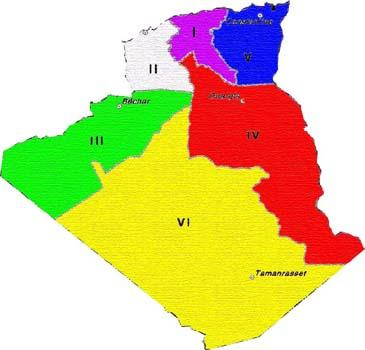
Algerian military regions

This system of territorial organization, adopted shortly after independence, grew out of the wartime wilaya structure and the postwar necessity of subduing antigovernment insurgencies that were based in the various regions. Regional commanders control and administer bases, logistics, and housing, as well as conscript training. However, commanders of army divisions and brigades, air force installations, and naval forces report directly to the Ministry of National Defence and service chiefs of staff on operational matters.

Military region commanders in 2003 included Brahim Fodel Chérif (1st Military Region), Kamel Abderrahmane (2nd Military Region, Abcène Tafer (3rd Military Region), Abdelmadjid Sahed (4th Military Region, Chérif Abderrazak (5th Military Region) and Ali Benali (6th Military Region).

=== Australia ===
Between 1911 and 1997, the Australian Army had an official system of between six and eight military districts, based on the boundaries of Australian states and territories.

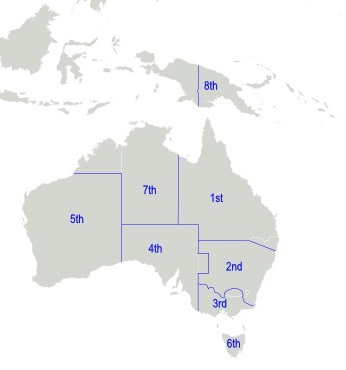
Australian military districts, 1939–1942.

From 1911:

Military Districts	Abbreviation	Area
1st Military District	1MD	Queensland and the 12th Battalion area, including Casino, Lismore, Grafton, the Northern Territory. (The Territory of Papua and Territory of New Guinea were added to 1MD after World War I.)
2nd Military District	2MD	New South Wales (excluding: the 12th Battalion area as above; Broken Hill, Torrowangee and Silverton; and the 44th Battalion area, including Corowa, South Corowa, Mulwala, Moama, Mathoura, and Deniliquin) and the 57th Battalion area of Victoria, including Wodonga, Barnawartha, Chiltern and Tallangatta.
3rd Military District	3MD	Victoria (excluding the 57th Battalion area as above), including the 44th Battalion area as above.
4th Military District	4MD	South Australia and Broken Hill, Torrowangee, and Silverton in New South Wales.
5th Military District	5MD	Western Australia.
6th Military District	6MD	Tasmania.

In 1939, an additional two districts were created.

Military Districts	Abbreviation	Area
7th Military District	7MD	Northern Territory and the Kimberley region.
8th Military District	8MD	Territories of Papua & New Guinea

During World War II, the military districts were temporarily replaced by a system of operational commands.

=== China ===
==== Republic of China ====
NRA military regions in August 1937

There were 76 northern military districts or military regions (軍區), or war areas, which were the largest formations of the National Revolutionary Army, under the Military Affairs Commission, chaired by Chiang Kai-shek during the Second Sino-Japanese War and World War II. During the Second Sino-Japanese War the National Revolutionary Army eventually organized itself into twelve Military Regions.

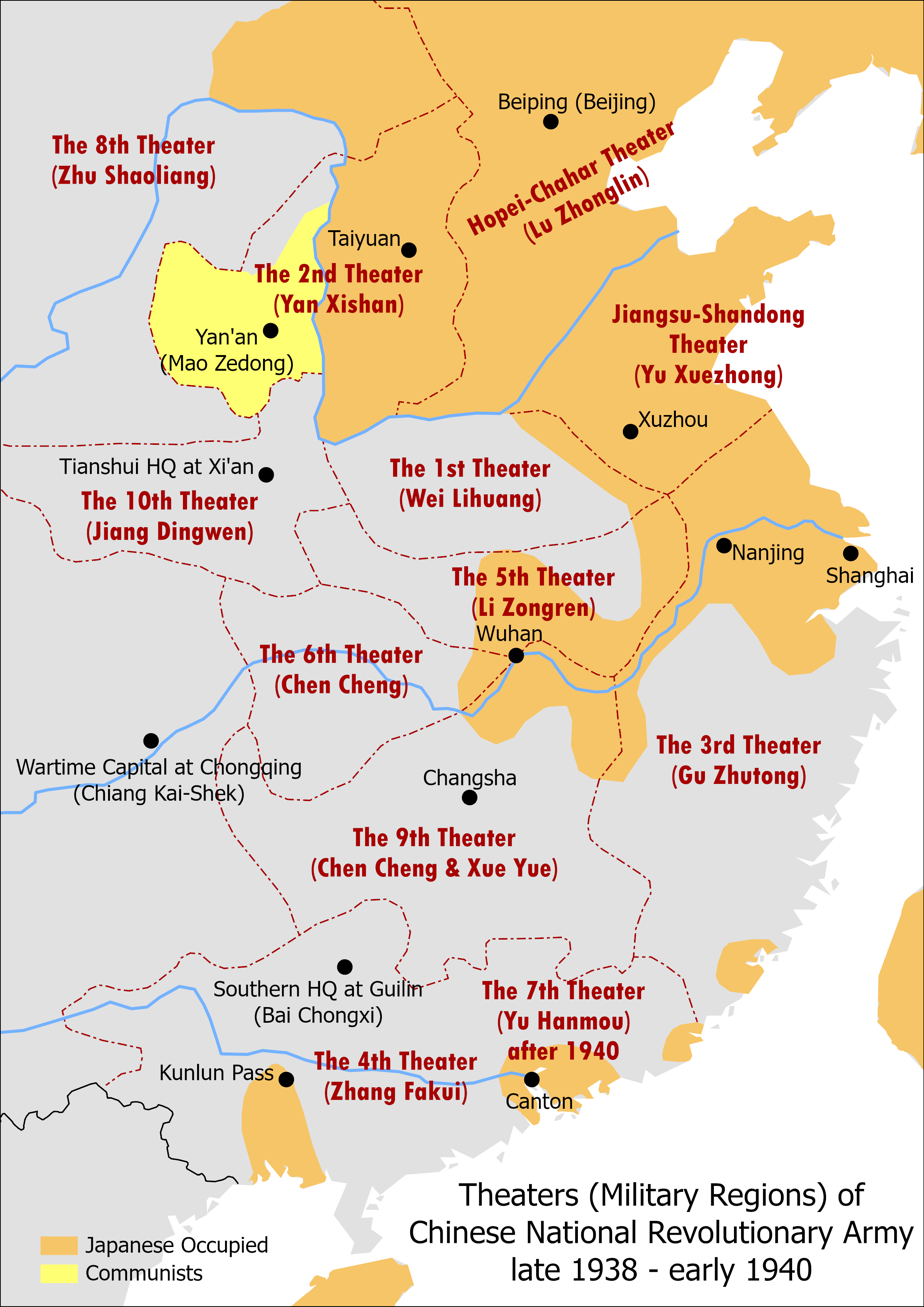
NRA operational regions from late 1938 to early 1940

==== People's Republic of China ====
The military regions (originally eleven, then seven) of the People's Liberation Army were divided into military districts (usually contiguous with provinces) and military sub-districts, under the command of the Central Military Commission.

In February 2016, the 7 military regions were changed to 5 theater commands:

The five theater commands of the PLA

- Eastern Theater Command
- Southern Theater Command
- Western Theater Command
- Northern Theater Command
- Central Theater Command

=== France ===
==== Third Republic ====
Under the Third Republic, a military region comprised several departments which supported an army corps. For many years up to 21 military regions were active.

On 24 July 1873, the French Parliament passed a law which created 18 military regions in metropolitan France. A 19th Army Corps was created in Algeria in September 1873 (see Région militaire). In 1905, the strength of the Troupes coloniales stationed in the 19 military districts of metropolitan France was reported at 2,123 officers and 26,581 other ranks. In 1946, following the Second World War ten military regions were created or recreated, in accordance with a decree of 18 February 1946. They included the 1st (Paris); 2e (Lille); 3e (Rennes); 4e (Bordeaux); 5e (Toulouse); 6e (Metz); 7e (Dijon); 8th (Lyon); the 9th (Marseille), and the 10th in Algeria. The 10th Military Region (France) supervised French Algeria during the Algerian War.

==== Fifth Republic ====
With the evolution of administrative organization, France was divided into regional administrative districts (circa 1963) (administrative region dependent of a prefect of the region). The military organisation then combined the administrative organization and in each CAR corresponded a territorial military division (TMD). On the defence side, these military divisions have been grouped into military regions. Their number varied depending on the period. The current number is six.

The Défense opérationnelle du territoire supervised reserve and home defence activities from 1959 to the 1970s. However, by the 1980s the number had been reduced to six: the 1st Military Region (France) with its headquarters in Paris, the 2nd Military Region (France) at Lille, the 3rd Military Region (France) at Rennes, the 4th Military Region (France) at Bordeaux, the 5th at Lyons and 6th at Metz. Each supervised up to five division militaire territoriale – military administrative sub-divisions, in 1984 sometimes supervising up to three reserve regiments each.

In the twenty-first century, under the latest thorough reform of the French security and defence sector, there are seven Zone de défense et de sécurité each with a territorial ground army region: Paris (or Île-de-France, HQ in Paris), Nord (HQ in Lille), Ouest (HQ in Rennes), Sud-Ouest (HQ in Bordeaux), Sud (HQ in Marseille), Sud-Est (HQ in Lyon), Est (HQ in Strasbourg).

=== Germany ===
==== German Reich ====
From 1919 until 1945, Germany used the system of military districts (German: Wehrkreis) to relieve field commanders of as much administrative work as possible and to provide a regular flow of trained recruits and supplies to the Field Army. The method they adopted was to separate the Field Army (Oberbefehlshaber des Heeres) from the Home Command (Heimatkriegsgebiet) and to entrust the responsibilities of training, conscription, supply and equipment to that command.

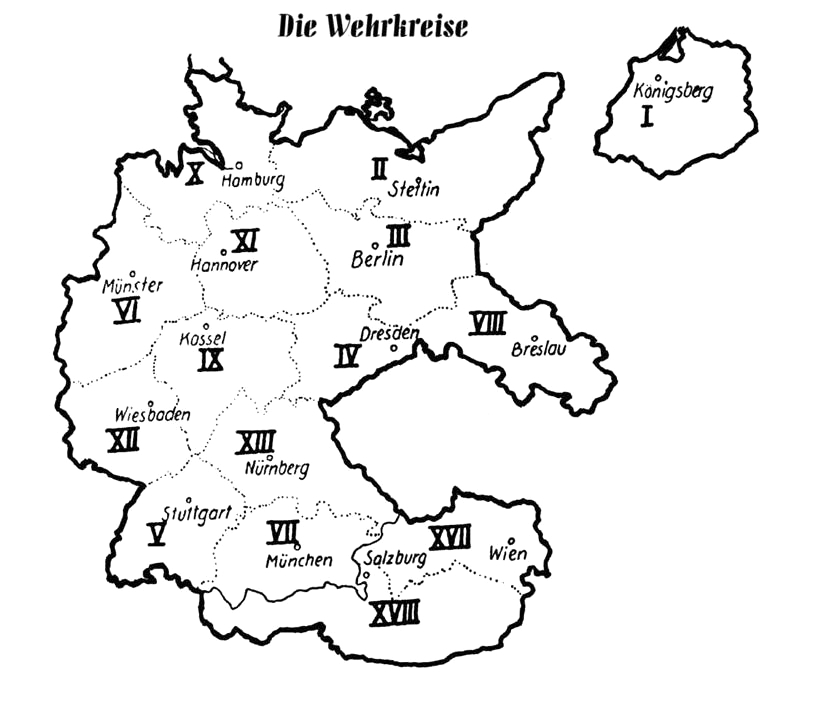
The Wehrkreise after the Anschluss

The Commander of the Infantry Corps with the identical number also commanded the Wehrkreis in peacetime, but command of the Wehrkreis passed to his second-in command at the outbreak of war.

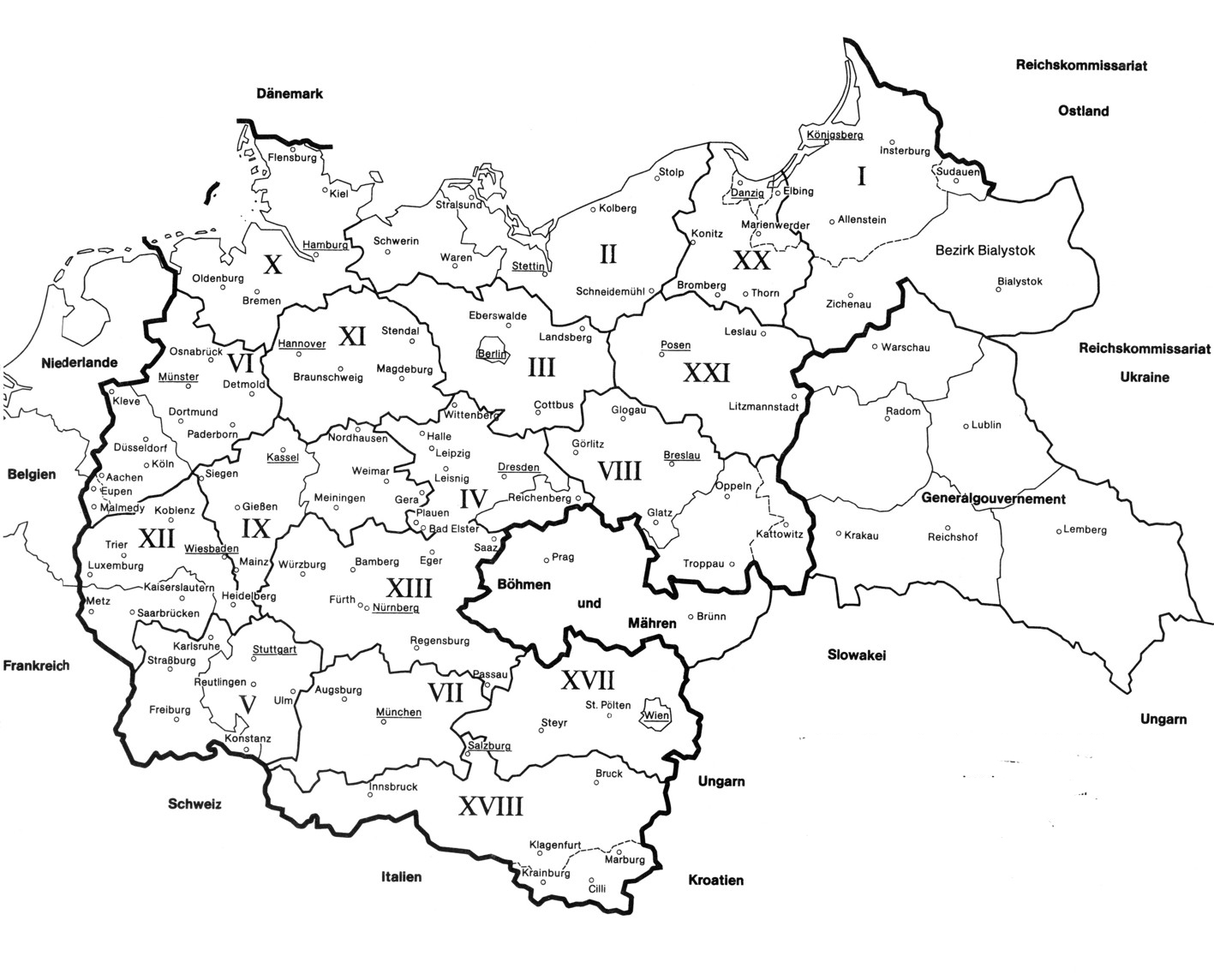
Map of the Wehrkreise in 1943-1944

In peacetime, the Wehrkreis was the home to the Infantry Corps of the same number and all subordinate units of that Corps.

==== Federal Republic of Germany ====
Until 2013 the German Armed Forces (Bundeswehr) had four military districts – Wehrbereichskommando (WBK) as part of the Streitkräftebasis or Joint Service Support Command. Each WBK controlled several Landeskommandos (State Commands) due to the federal structure of Germany who have taken over functions carried out by the Verteidigungsbezirkskommandos (VBKs) or Military Region Commands (Defence District Commands) as. These command authorities are in charge of all military facilities. Now the Landeskommmandos are led by the National Territorial Command called Kommando Territoriale Aufgaben der Bundeswehr (KdoTerrAufgBw).

=== Indonesia ===
Indonesian military districts as of 2021

The Indonesian Army operates with military districts, known as Komando Daerah Militer (Military Region Command) abbreviated Kodam. It was created by General Soedirman as a system initially called "Wehrkreise", adapted from the German system during World War II. The system was later ratified in "Surat Perintah Siasat No.1" (No.1 Strategy Command Letter), signed in November 1948.

The Military regional commands function as a means of circle of defense, or regional defense, to defend the designated islands/provinces under Indonesian territory. Each Kodam is commanded by a Major General and has full authority to commence operations with the force under his jurisdiction. The commander (known as Panglima Kodam abbreviated Pangdam) reports to the Chief of Army Staff (KSAD) and is responsible for territorial defence during times of war and development and supervision during times of peace. He is also responsible for ensuring security and protection for VVIP visiting his territory, e.g Presidential visits, etc.

=== Kazakhstan ===
Regional Commands of Kazakhstan

A Regional Command (Kazakh: Аймақтық қолбасшылық, Aımaqtyq qolbasshylyq; Russian: Региональное командование, Regional'noe komandovanie) in Kazakhstan operates in a similar fashion to Russian military districts.

The Kazakh Ground Forces are divided into four regional commands:

- Regional Command "Astana" headquartered in Astana
- Regional Command "East" headquartered in Semey
- Regional Command "West" headquartered in Atyrau
- Regional Command "South" headquartered in Taraz

=== Poland ===
Initially, right after the First World War, Poland had five military districts (1918–1921):

- Kraków Military District (Krakowski Okręg Wojskowy), HQ in Kraków
- Łódź Military District (Łódzki Okręg Wojskowy), HQ in Łódź
- Lublin Military District (Lubelski Okręg Wojskowy), HQ in Lublin.
- Poznań Military District (Poznański Okręg Wojskowy), HQ in Poznań
- Warsaw Military District (Warszawski Okręg Wojskowy), HQ in Warsaw.

In 1921, due to reorganization, the military districts were replaced with Dowództwo Okręgu Korpusu (DOK – Corps District Command). In the Second Polish Republic there were ten DOKs:

- I – Warsaw
- II – Lublin
- III – Grodno
- IV – Łódź
- V – Kraków
- VI – Lwów
- VII – Poznań
- VIII – Toruń
- IX – Brześć nad Bugiem
- X – Przemyśl

Each DOK consisted of four large units (three infantry divisions and one cavalry brigade).

For district arrangements after World War II see Polish Land Forces. The Kraków Military District disbanded in 1953. From 1999 Poland has been divided into two military districts, the Pomeranian Military District and the Silesian Military District, both were disbanded by the end of 2011.

=== Russia and Soviet Union ===
==== Russian Empire ====
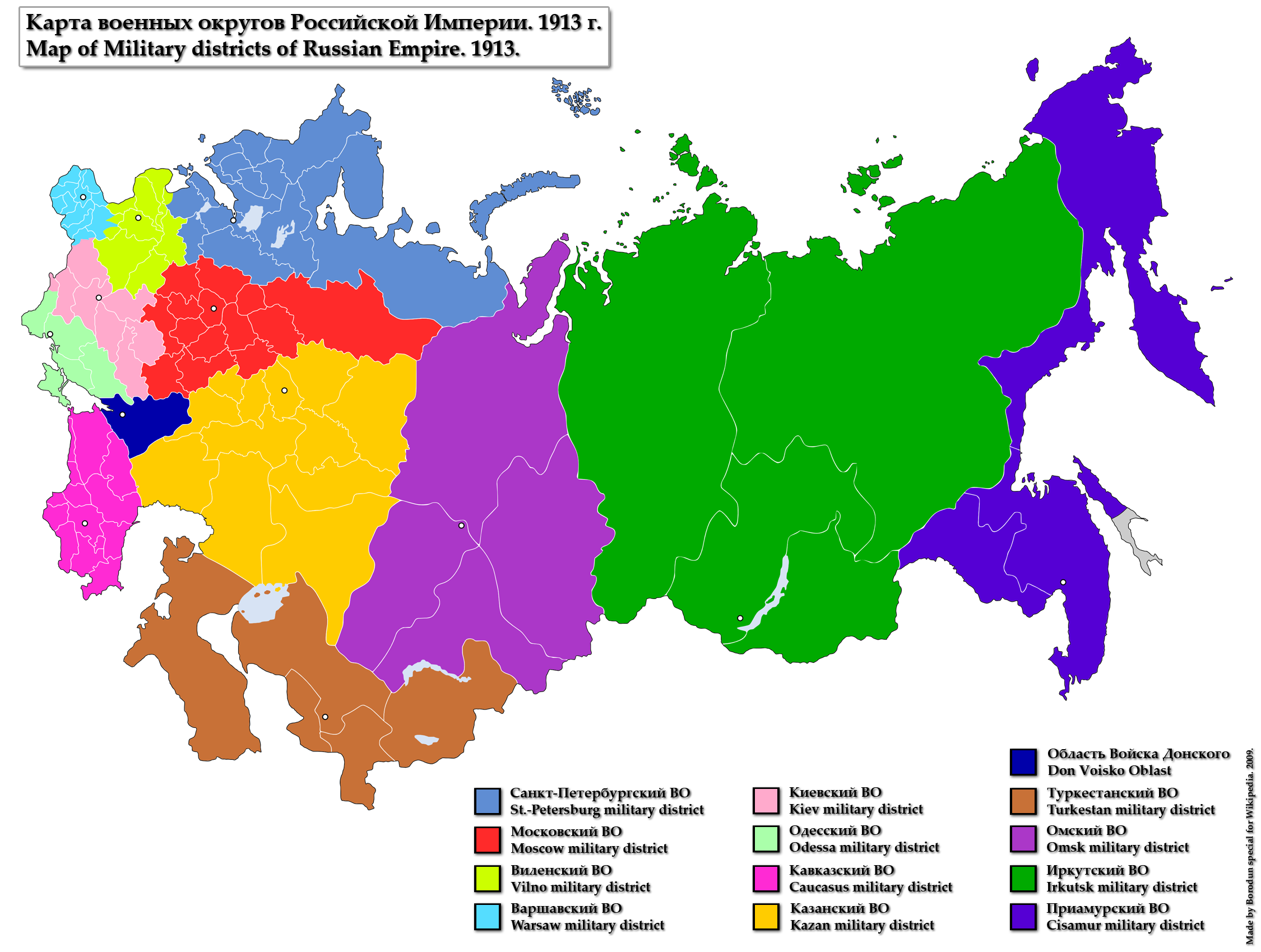
Military districts of the Russian Empire in 1913

The Russian Empire's military district (Russian: вое́нный о́круг, voyenny okrug) was a territorial association of military units, formations, military schools, and various local military establishments. This territorial division type was utilized in Imperial Russia, USSR and is currently in use in Russian Federation.

Such territorial division provided convenient management of army units, their training and other activities regarding the country's readiness to defend itself.

==== Soviet Union ====
Military districts of the Soviet Union, 1989 Baltic Military District Belorussian Military District Carpathian Military District Central Asian Military District Far Eastern Military District Kiev Military District Leningrad Military District Moscow Military District North Caucasus Military District Odessa Military District Siberian Military District Transbaikal Military District Transcaucasian Military District Turkestan Military District Ural Military District Volga Military District

In the USSR, the military districts continued to perform the same role they had done in the Russian Empire, with first six military districts (Yaroslavsky, Moskovsky, Orlovsky, Belomorsky, Uralsky, and Privolzhsky) were formed on 31 March 1918 during the Russian Civil War.

This increased to 17 military districts of the USSR at the beginning of July 1940 shortly before the USSR was invaded by Germany and entered the Second World War, and were used to create combat Fronts after commencement of the German invasion of the USSR.

During the war the districts were further divided into geographic regions for logistic reasons, these being:

- North and North Western districts
- West and Central USSR districts
- South and South Western districts
- Siberian and Central Asian districts
- Far Eastern districts

After the war, the number was increased to 33 to aid in demobilisation of forces, but by October 1946, they had been reduced to 21.

By the end of the 1980s, immediately before the dissolution of the Soviet Union, there were sixteen military districts, within three to five main strategic Theatre groupings.

==== Russian Federation ====
Military districts of Russia 1992-1998

Military districts (Russian: вое́нный о́круг, voyenny okrug) in the Russian Federation operates under the command of the district headquarters, headed by the district commander, and is subordinated to the General Staff of the Armed Forces of the Russian Federation. (Previously under Commander-in-Chief of the Ground Forces General Nikolai Kormiltsev, the military districts reported to the General Staff via the Russian Ground Forces staff.) It is a territorial association of military units, formations, military schools, and various local military establishments. This territorial division type was historically adopted, originally by Imperial Russia, to provide a more efficient management of army units, their training and other operations activities related to combat readiness.

Military districts of Russia, 2001–2010

From 1992 to 2010, the Armed Forces maintained a diminishing number of former Soviet Armed Forces districts – Leningrad Military District, Moscow Military District, Volga-Urals Military District, North Caucasus Military District, Siberian Military District, Far East Military District.

Military districts of Russia as of 1 September 2010

Military districts of Russia as of 1 December 2010

In 2009–2010, these districts were reorganised into 4 Military Districts comprising regional Joint Strategic Commands.

Military districts of Russia as of 2 April 2014

In 2014 Northern Fleet was reorganized into separate Joint Strategic Command.

Military districts as of Russia 2016

From March 2024 onwards 5 military districts are active in the Russian Armed Forces:

- Leningrad Military District with headquarters in Saint Petersburg
- Southern Military District with headquarters in Rostov-on-Don
- Central Military District with headquarters in Ekaterinburg
- Eastern Military District with headquarters in Khabarovsk
- Moscow Military District with headquarters in Moscow

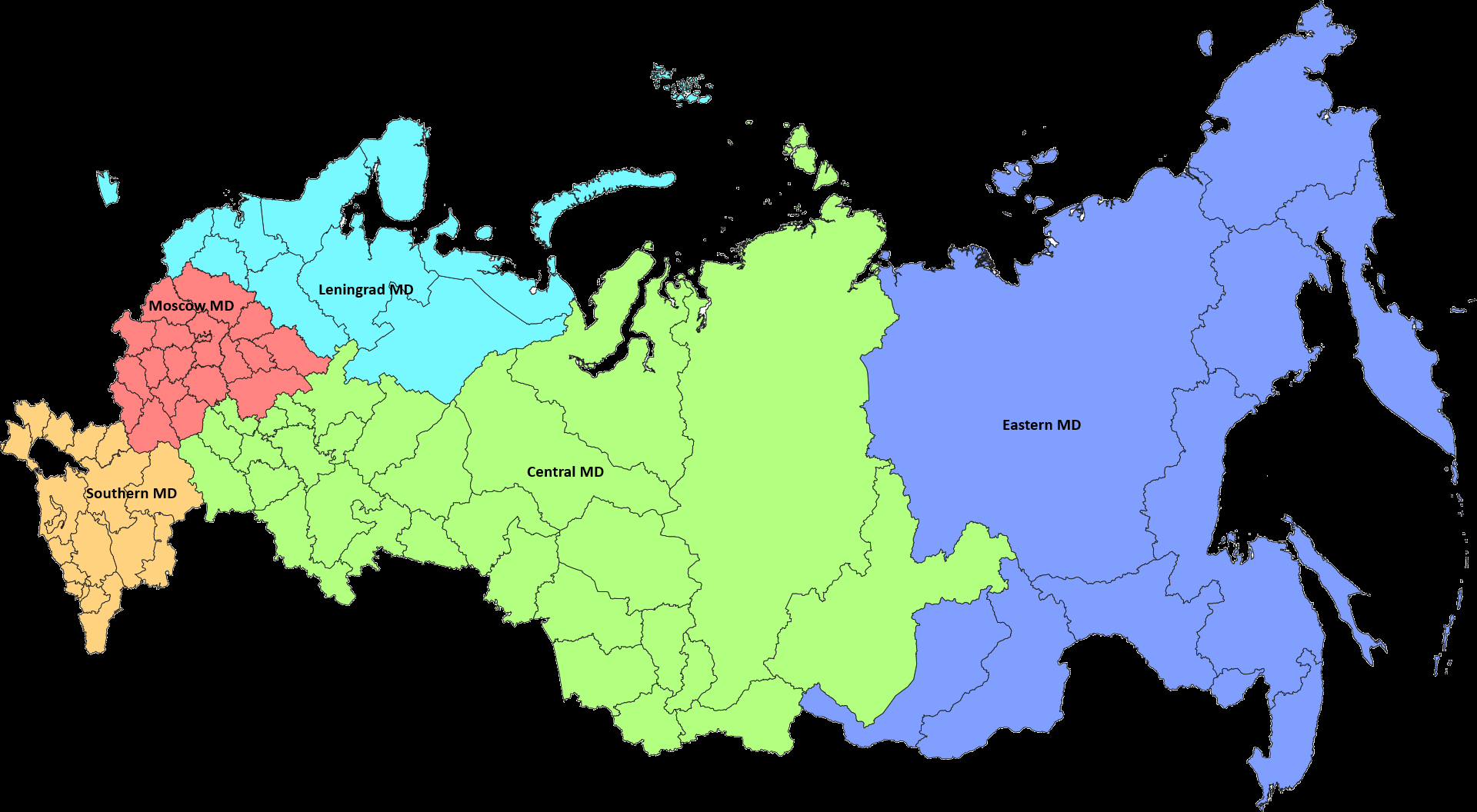
Military districts of Russia as of 2024

=== Sweden ===
The military district (Swedish: Militärområde, usually abbreviated to Milo) was an administrative division of the Swedish Armed Forces, and was a higher regional level subdivision. The commander of a military district, the Militärområdesbefälhavare (also militärbefälhavare), commanded the Swedish Army divisions stationed in the region, the regional naval command, the regional air defence sector as well as the lower regional level subdivision defence districts that made up the military district. The commander answered directly to the Supreme Commander. The military districts in the modern form were created in 1966, and each district was named according to the geographical area they covered. Several changes were made, such as creating or merging districts, until all military districts were disbanded in 2000. After the Defence Act of 2000 the military districts were replaced by new military districts (Swedish: Militärdistrikt, usually abbreviated to MD). The new military districts corresponded geographically to the former military districts, however, they did not have the same territorial and operational tasks. In 2005, the military districts were replaced to some extent by four Security and Cooperation Sections (Swedish: Säkerhets- och samverkanssektioner).

In 2013, the Security and Cooperation Sections were replaced by four Military regions (Swedish: Militärregion, MR): Northern, Central, Western and Southern. A fifth military region, Gotland Military Region (Militärregion Gotland, MR G) was formed in 2019.

=== United Kingdom ===
British Army regional districts have evolved slowly over the previous 150 years or so. For many years there were regional commands in the UK, including Aldershot Command (from 1880), Eastern Command, Northern Command, Scottish Command, Southern Command and Western Command (from 1905). By 1985 these were superseded by districts, and until the spring of 1991 there were nine of them. Antony Beevor wrote in his revised edition of Inside the British Army in 1991 that '..the first of the minor districts to be amalgamated were North West District, Western District, and Wales, to form a new Western District.' HQ Northern Ireland remained separate and reported to Headquarters United Kingdom Land Forces only on non-operational matters.

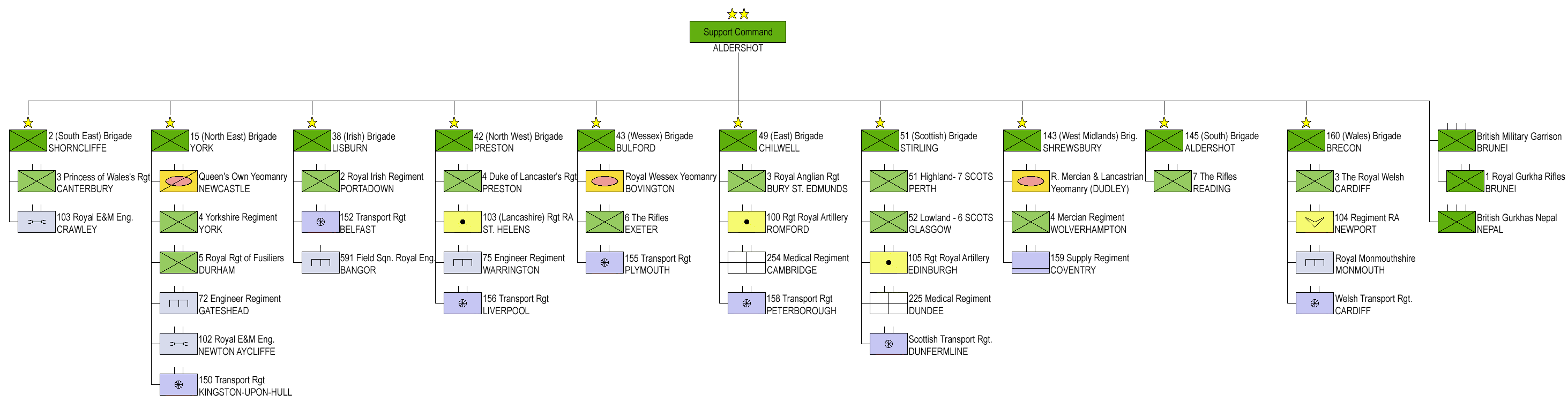
Structure Regional Forces c.2006

From 1995, UK commands and later districts were replaced by regenerative divisions. 2nd Division, 4th Division, 5th Division and London District acted as regional commands within the UK reporting to Commander Regional Forces. Scotland District was absorbed by 2nd Division in 2000. The divisions were responsible for training subordinate formations and units under their command for operations in the UK, such as Military Aid to the Civil Community, as well as training units for overseas deployments. 2nd, 4th and 5th Divisions were replaced by Support Command on 1 November 2011.

=== United States ===
The military department was a military and administrative command of the US Army. The U.S. Army is in the mid-2020s divided into functional commands within the Continental United States and regional commands abroad; the Navy has both functional and regional commands as well. Neither service has multiple formations responsible for "raise, train, and maintain" functions within a specific geographical area of responsibility, as the old districts did.

==== Reconstruction military districts (1867–1870) ====
In March 1867, Congress passed the Reconstruction Acts, a series of acts that included the division of the former Confederate States (excluding Tennessee) into five military districts. These districts included:

- First Military District (comprising Virginia)
- Second Military District (comprising North Carolina and South Carolina)
- Third Military District (comprising Georgia, Alabama and Florida)
- Fourth Military District (comprising Arkansas and Mississippi)
- Fifth Military District (comprising Texas and Louisiana)

Each of these districts were governed by former Union Army general officers, and was required to adopt a new state constitution and ratify the 14th Amendment under the Reconstruction Acts in order to rejoin the Union.

In the 21st century, the United States Department of Defense operationally divides the world into geographic Unified Combatant Commands: the United States Africa Command; United States Central Command; United States European Command; United States Pacific Command; the United States Northern Command; the United States Southern Command. These are operational organisations without the usual administrative roles of military districts.

=== Uzbekistan ===
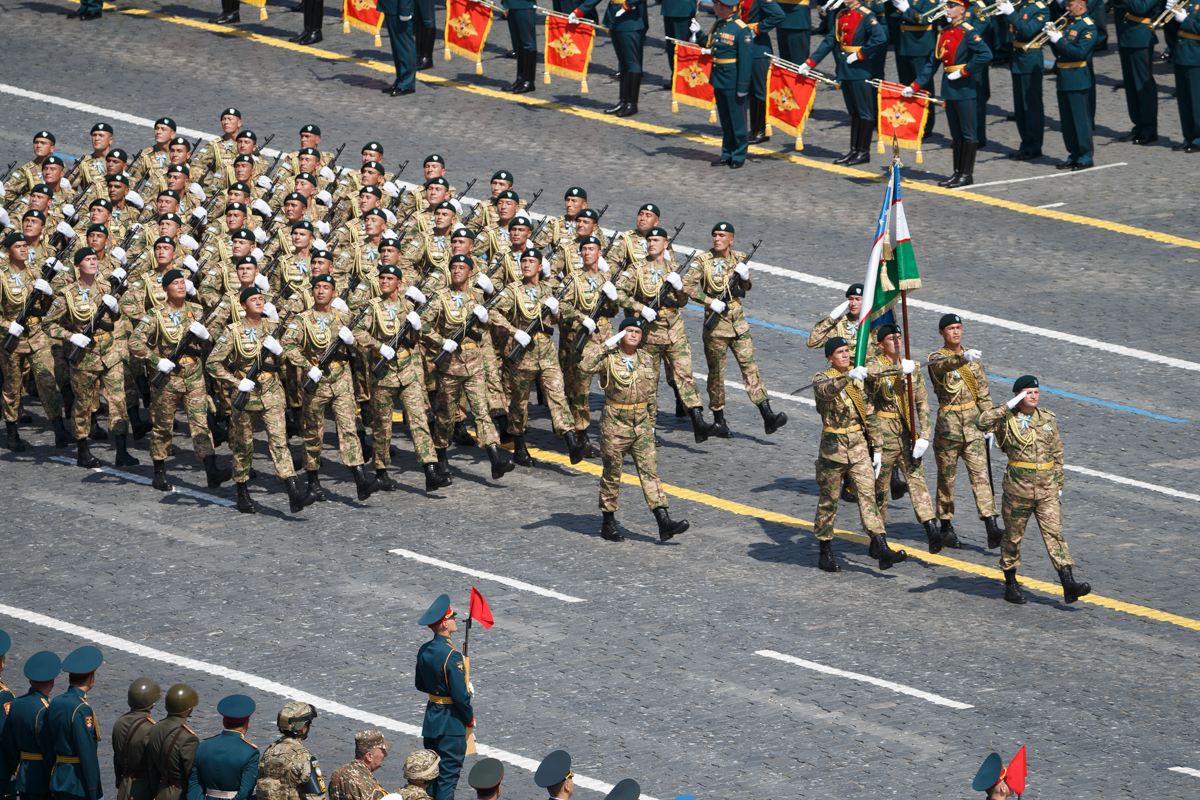
Troops of the Tashkent Military District during the 2020 Moscow Victory Day Parade on Red Square.

Military districts (Uzbek: Harbiy okruglar) of the Armed Forces of Uzbekistan are under the jurisdiction of the defense ministry of the republic. In May 2001, the Tashkent Garrison was transformed into the Tashkent Military District. The following are a list of military districts in Uzbekistan:

- Northwest Military District (HQ Nukus)
- Southwest Special Military District (HQ Qarshi)
- Central Military District (HQ Dzhizak)
- Eastern Military District (HQ Ferghana)
- Tashkent Military District (HQ Tashkent)

The replenishment of the ranks of divisions and units in wartime is done by order of the commanders of military districts.

=== Vietnam ===
Vietnam People's Army has 8 Military Regions; each is directly under the Ministry of Defense of Vietnam:

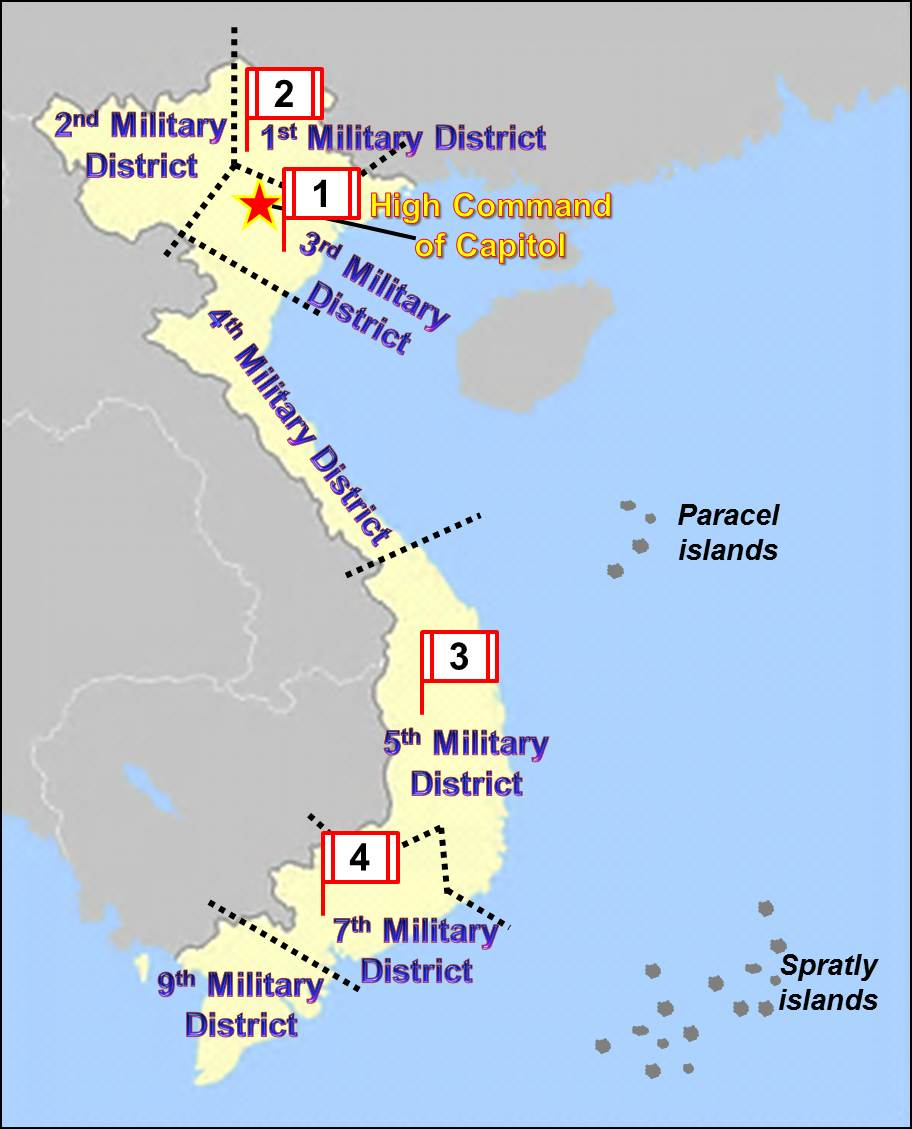
- Military regions in Vietnam
  Hanoi Capital Command:Tasked to organize, build, manage and command armed forces defending the capital. The headquarters is in Hanoi.
- 1st Military Region: Tasked to protect against foreign invaders; and to organize, build, manage and command forces in northeastern Vietnam. The headquarters is in Thai Nguyen.
- 2nd Military Region:Tasked to organize, build, manage and command armed forces defending northwestern Vietnam. The headquarters is in Viet Tri.
- 3rd Military Region: Tasked to organize, build, manage and command armed forces defending the Red River Delta area. The headquarters is in Hai Phong.
- 4th Military Region: Tasked to organize, build, manage and command armed forces defending north central Vietnam. The headquarters is in Vinh.
- 5th Military Region: Tasked to organize, build, manage and command armed forces defending south central Vietnam, including the western highlands and south central coastal provinces. The headquarters is in Da Nang.
- 7th Military Region: Tasked to organize, build, manage and command armed forces defending southeastern Vietnam. The headquarters is in Ho Chi Minh City.
- 9th Military Region: Tasked to organize, build, manage and command armed forces defending the Mekong Delta. The headquarters is in Cần Thơ

The Army of the Republic of Vietnam originally had four corps, for example I Corps (South Vietnam). Later they were redesignated Military Regions 1–4.

== See also ==
- Fortified district
