= Pomeranian Military District =

Former Polish military command (1945–2011)

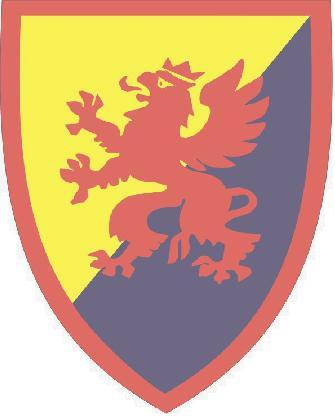
District insignia

The Pomeranian Military District (Polish acronym POW) was a military district of the Polish Armed Forces from 1945 to 2011. Formally it was subordinate to the Minister of National Defence in the operational matters of defense and detached government administration (Art. 14 Law of 21 November 1967 on the universal duty to defend the Polish Republic). The district command headquarters was at Toruń (1945–1946), Bydgoszcz, Gdańsk, Koszalin, and then at Bydgoszcz. From 1947 to 2007 1 Gen. J. Dwernicki Street, from 2007 to December 2011 105th Szubinska Street.

Since 1999, the POW is one of the two military districts in Poland. After 92 years, in accordance with the decision of the Minister of National Defence, in December 2011 the Pomeranian Military District was deactivated.

== First Combined Arms Army ==
The First Combined Arms Army (Polish: Pierwsza Armia Ogólnowojskowa; see pl:1 Armia Ogólnowojskowa WP (1955-1990)) was a military formation of the Polish Land Forces created in 1955. It was intended to guard the Baltic Sea shores as part of the Polish Front (pl:Front Polski (1950)) and capture the Danish Straits in case the Cold War turned hot. Unlike the 2nd Polish Army (raised and using after the Prague Spring of 1968), it was never mobilised and made operational. It was disbanded as soon as Poland regained her independence from the Soviet bloc and left the Warsaw Pact.

Although all armies of the Polish Army were disbanded in 1945, already in 1950 a need arose to re-create war-time structure of the armed forces in case of a conflict with NATO. For that purpose in 1950 a Polish Front (also known as Coastal Front) was created from Polish units, as part of Soviet war preparations. In 1955 the front was further subdivided into armies. Each of three Polish Military Districts created a separate army: the Pomeranian Military District created the 1st All-Arms Army, the Silesian Military District created the 2nd Army while Warsaw Military District created the 4th. All air assets were to be joined into the 3rd Air Army in case of mobilisation.

The 1st Army included all units under command of the Pomeranian Military District, among them the Headquarters, the 8th, 12th and 15th Mechanised Divisions, 16th and 20th Armoured Divisions, as well as 2nd Special Battalion (deep reconnaissance), two artillery brigades, one anti-tank regiment, engineering brigade, two engineering regiments and numerous other smaller units.

The army was never activated and was disbanded in 1990.

== Formations and units in 1985 ==
Army Command and Headquarters (Dowództwo i sztab armii)

- 4th Signals Regiment (4 Pułk Łączności)
- 12th Radio Relay Cable-Laying Regiment (12 Pułk Radioliniowo-Kablowy)
- 12th Radioelectronic Intelligence Battalion (12 Batalion Rozpoznania Radioelektronicznego)
- 10th Radiotechnical [airspace surveillance] Battalion (10 Batalion Radiotechniczny)
- 2nd Special [Forces] Battalion (Long Range Reconnaissance) (2 Batalion Specjalny (dalekiego rozpoznania))
- 8th Mechanised Division (8 Dywizja Zmechanizowana)
- 12th Mechanised Division (12 Dywizja Zmechanizowana)
- 15th Mechanised Division (15 Dywizja Zmechanizowana)
- 16th Armored Division (16 Dywizja Pancerna)
- 20th Armored Division (20 Dywizja Pancerna)
- 2nd Operational-Tactical [intermediate range SSM] Missile Brigade (2 Brygada Rakiet Operacyjno-Taktycznych)
- 6th Gun Artillery Brigade (6 Brygada Artylerii Armat)
- 14th Anti-Tank Artillery Regiment (Poland) (14 Pułk Artylerii Przeciwpancernej)
- 5th Combat Engineer Brigade (5 Brygada Saperów)
- 3rd Pontoon Bridgelaying Regiment (3 Pułk Pontonowy)
- 16th Road-Building Engineer Regiment (16 Pułk Inżynieryjno-Drogowy)
- 2nd Chemical [NBC] Brigade (2 Brygada Chemiczna)
- 5th Supply Regiment (5 Pułk Zabezpieczenia)

== District commanders ==
- 21 April 1945 – 15 May 1945 – acting ppłk Mikołaj Iwanow
- 16 May 1945 – 24 September 1945 – płk (gen. bryg.) Wacław Szokalski;
- 25 September 1945 – 10 October 1945 – gen. bryg. Wiaczesław Jakutowicz;
- 11 October 1945 – 25 June 1947 – gen. bryg. Jan Jośkiewicz;
- 26 June 1947 – 15 October 1947 – gen. bryg. Jan Rotkiewicz;
- 19 November 1947 – 21 January 1953 – gen. dyw. Bronisław Półturzycki;
- 21 March 1953 – 29 May 1953 – acting (partly) gen. bryg. Antoni Władyczański;
- 30 May 1953 – 22 October 1954 – acting gen. bryg. Antoni Władyczański;
- 31 December 1954 – 5 November 1956 – gen. dyw. Jan Rotkiewicz;
- 6 November 1956 – 14 November 1964 – gen. dyw. Zygmunt Huszcza;
- 15 November 1964 – 18 May 1971 – gen. dyw. Józef Kamiński;
- 19 May 1971 – 26 February 1978 – gen. dyw. Wojciech Barański;
- 27 February 1978 – 14 March 1983 – gen. dyw. Józef Użycki;
- 1 April 1983 – 22 September 1989 – gen. dyw. Zbigniew Blechman;
- 23 September 1989 – 3 September 1992 – gen. dyw. Zbigniew Zalewski;
- 4 September 1992 – 8 September 2000 – gen. dyw. Tadeusz Bazydło;
- 9 September 2000 – 11 December 2003 – gen. dyw. Leszek Chyła;
- 12 December 2003 – 5 October 2006 – gen. dyw. Zbigniew Głowienka
- 6 October 2006 – 11 January 2007 – acting gen. bryg. Zygmunt Duleba
- 12 January 2007 – 28 December 2011 – gen. bryg. Zygmunt Duleba

== References for First Army ==
- Jerzy Kajetanowicz (7 November 2009). "Wojsko Polskie w Układzie Warszawskim 1955-1985". Zasoby forum ogólnowojskowego "Bezpieczeństwo" (in Polish).
- Jerzy Kajetanowicz (2008). "Polskie wojska operacyjne w systemie bezpieczeństwa państwa w latach 1955-1975". Zeszyty Naukowe Akademii Obrony Narodowej (in Polish) (2). Warsaw: Akademia Obrony Narodowej.
