= Silesian Military District =

Former Polish military command (1945–2011)

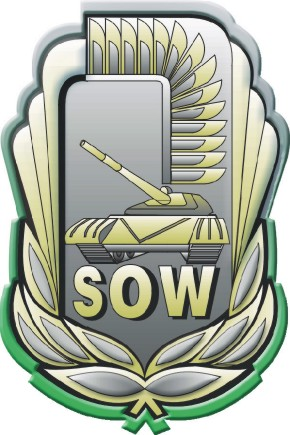
Śląski Okręg Wojskowy

Silesian Military District (Polish: Śląski Okręg Wojskowy) was one of three military districts in Poland, the other two being the Pomeranian Military District and the Warsaw Military District. All three were disbanded by the end of 2011 due to the restructuring of the Polish Army. Its headquarters was in Wrocław.

Its history dates back to the aftermath of World War II, when Military District Silesia (Okręg Wojskowy Śląsk) was formed in 1945.

== District history ==
The Silesian Military District Commander-in-Chief position was established in accordance with command of the Polish Army order No. 0208, authorized on August 22, 1945. On the basis of Headquarters First Army, the Military District Command of Silesia was created at Katowice. The district's area, which included the provinces of Silesian-Dąbrowski and Wrocław province, is now dissolved. The organizational structure of the district headquarters was:

- Command and Staff
- Management of political and educational
- Command of artillery and armor
- Faculties: engineering, chemical, aerospace, personnel (human resources), health care and financial
- Logistics
- The prosecution and the court-martial

When the district was created, several divisions were subsequently set to be deployed: Polish 2nd Warsaw Infantry Division, Polish 6th Pomeranian Infantry Division, 8th Dresden Infantry Division and the 10th Sudecka Infantry Division. Between August and September 1945 the largest changes occurred, as many of the military units were disbanded. Outside the county were the following divisions: the Polish 2nd Warsaw Infantry Division, 6 and Infantry Divisions 8, transferred to the Military Districts Kraków and Łódź, with others came districts: 7, 11 and 13 Infantry Division (LWP).

On October 22, 1945 the Silesian Military District had 42,291 soldiers. During this period, the district took command of subordinate units and the organization of military administration. At the same time, he took over the functions of the district headquarters, including the operational defense of its territorial area.

In March 1946 the headquarters of the District were moved from Katowice to Wrocław. On November 15, 1946 Silesian Military District Command was renamed the Command Military District No. IV (DOW IV), which remained in effect until 1953. In 1947, the district headquarters were put under control of the Land Forces Command. This was again reinstated by popular consensus on December 22, 1997.

In 1948, the soldiers within the district were involved in removing land mines in the post-war clearance effort: 3.5 million mines and 7 million pieces of unexploded shells, bombs and missiles were located and removed. On 4 March 1949 the Poznań Military District was dissolved and the troops of its territory were incorporated into the Silesian Military District. In 1950, as a result of changes in administrative divisions within the district, there were five provinces recognized: Wrocław, Poznań, Katowice, Opole, and Zielona Góra.

Troops of the district were involved in suppressing the Poznań 1956 protests.

In the early 1960s the armed forces were divided into the Army Operational and territorial defense. On the basis of the operational units of the Silesian Military District, the Second Army was reformed in the event that a war broke out, and the army was included in the Polish Front. This was in accordance with the United Armed Forces of the Warsaw Pact. In July 1968, the 2nd Army was reformed from the district's troops for the purpose of participation in Operation Danube. The army, commanded by general Florian Siwicki, was disbanded in November 1968. The army consisted of 30,000 soldiers, 7,000 transport vehicles, 750 tanks, and 592 APCs.

In November 1973 the District began contributing soldiers to United Nations Emergency Force II, supervising the Egyptian-Israeli truce. Since then, they have been used in a variety of tasks throughout the world, such as in Egypt, Syria, Namibia Western Sahara, Cambodia Iran, Iraq and countries of the former Yugoslavia. District officers have performed as United Nations military observers since 1953. In the years 1953–1957 and from 1973, SCO officers were involved in the International Control Commission in (Vietnam, Laos, Cambodia).

As a result of further administrative division in 1975, the Silesian Military District expanded to have 13 provinces within its radius of control, adding the following provinces; Częstochowa, Jelenia Góra, Wałbrzych, Legnica, Leszno, Kalisz Voivodeship, Sieradz, and Gorzów.

The 1990s were a period of restructuring for the Polish Army. The subordination of the District meant that there were 5 divisions, which developed a number of support units, with the total number of troops reaching approximately 100,000. In 1993, in connection with the establishment of the Kraków Military District, the Silesian Military District had the Katowice and Częstochowa provinces removed, leaving a total of 11 provinces under its jurisdiction.

Since 1998 the Silesian Military District has covered 9 provinces: Lubusz, Lower Silesian, Opole, Silesian, Lesser, Subcarpathian, Lublin, Świętokrzyskie, and Łódź. SCO is one of the two existing military districts, and its area covers close to 143,000 km^{2} of the country and has a population of around 21 million citizens. The reorganization of the Polish Armed Forces carried out in the second half of the 1990s and at the beginning of the 2000s meant that it solved many problems regarding military units, including the finalization of the following districts:

- 5th Kresowa Mechanised Division (resolved 31 December 1998)
- 10th Sudecka Mechanised Division in Opole (resolved 11 November 1999)
- 4th Lubuska Mechanised Division in Krosno Odrzańskie (disbanded ("resolved") 31 March 2001). (see pl:4 Lubuska Dywizja Zmechanizowana)

The only division that has endured the period of restructuring in the Silesian Military District was the 11th Armoured Cavalry Division, which passed to the command of the 2nd Mechanised Corps in Kraków.

A new chapter in the history of the Silesian Military District was the Polish accession to NATO. Since joining NATO, soldiers within the District have participated in the allied exercises and operations:Dynamic Response '99, Allied Effort '01, Strong Resolve and 02 Enduring Freedom. Since 2000, soldiers of the district have begun to fulfil their first mission as the members of the military alliance as part of NATO's KFOR in Kosovo.

In 2001 the District passed the operational unit focused on territorial defense. The district took over the tasks of logistic support, territorial defense, the military administration and fulfillment of all important functions of the host country, which was a novelty in the Polish Armed Forces. During this period, new military units were created. It was decided to set up five engineering rescue battalions, which hold a very important place in the logistics tasks involved. The structure has four District Material Bases: Wrocław, Nowogród Bobrzański, Łódź, and Ponds, which deal with peace and wartime supply of its own and allied units operating in the District. In March 2004, adopted in the subordination of the District 1 Dębliński Regiment Road and Bridge abutment and 10 Logistic Brigade with Opole.
