= Warsaw Military District =

Former Polish military command (1945–1998)

The Warsaw Military District (Polish: Warszawski Okręg Wojskowy, WOW) was one of three military districts in Poland, the other two being the Pomeranian Military District and the Silesian Military District. It was the regional executive body of the Ministry of National Defense of Poland in the capital of Warsaw in operational and defense matters and military administration existing from 1945 to 1998.

== District history ==
After the end of World War II, six military districts were formed, and operating as of 1 August 1945, including the WOW. Months before in April, the Olsztyn was included in the district. In November 1945 the commander of the district was given the designation DOW I. In the autumn of 1945, the Faculty of the 2nd Division of Border Protection Forces (WOP) was formed at the Warsaw Military Command. The district, apart from administrative functions, also fulfilled the role of operational level command, subject to tactical relations and units stationed in its area. In 1949, the district was renamed the Warsaw Military District (WOW). In 1954, after the liquidation of the Kraków Military District, the WOW extended its reach to many regions such as Lublin, Kielce, Kraków and Rzeszów. After the establishment of the Soviet-led Warsaw Pact in 1955, the corps and part of the infantry division were disbanded. The remaining infantry divisions were transformed into mechanized divisions and were absorbed into the WOW. From the mid-1960s, in the event of a war on the basis of command and WOW units, the 4th Army was formed as part of the WOW. From April 1990, instead of the 4th General Army, based on the WOW, the 3 Mechanized Corps of the "W" time was created. At the end of 1998, as part of the reorganization of the military from military districts, the military district was disassembled and was primarily replaced through the Warsaw Garrison Command which was established three years prior.

== Organization ==
=== 1945 ===
The command had the following organizational structure in 1945:

- 1st Warsaw Infantry Division in Siedlce
- 15 Infantry Division in Olsztyn
- 1st Armoured Brigade of the defenders of Westerplatte in Modlin
- 7th Independent Heavy Tank Regiment in Modlin
- 13th Armored Artillery Regiment in Modlin
- 5th Sappers Brigade
- 1st Independent Communications Regiment

=== 1951 ===
The command had the following organizational structure in 1951:

- 8th Infantry Corps in Olsztyn
  - 15 Infantry Division in Olsztyn
  - 21st Infantry Division in Lidzbark Warmiński
  - 22nd Infantry Division in Giżycko
- 9th Infantry Corps in Lublin
  - 1st Warsaw Infantry Division in Legionowo
  - 3rd Pomeranian Infantry Division in Lublin
  - 18th Infantry Division in Ełk
- 24th Infantry Division in Zambrów
- 25th Infantry Division in Siedlce
- 11th Middle Tanks Regiment in Giżycko
- 8th Infantry Artillery Division in Orzysz
- 9th Division of Artillery in Warsaw
- 2nd Hard Sappers Brigade in Kazuń
- 6th Hard Sappers Brigade in Dęblin
- 7th Pontoon Regiment in Płock
- 5th Communications Regiment

=== 1988 ===
The command had the following organizational structure in 1988:

- 1st Mechanised Division in Legionowo
- 3rd Pomeranian Mechanized Division in Lublin
- 9rd Mechanized Division in Rzeszów
- 5th Brigade of the Internal Defense Forces in Kraków
- 6th Pomeranian Airborne Brigade in Kraków
- 1st Artillery Brigade in Węgorzewo
- 32nd Brigade of Operational-Tactic Missiles in Orzysz
- 21st Field Technical Repair Database in Orneta
- 80th Anti-tank Artillery Division in Suwałki
- 2nd Sappers Brigade in Kazuń
- 3rd Chemical Regiment in Biskupiec
- 9th Communications Regiment in Białobrzegi
- Command post of the WOPL WOW Commander in Białobrzegi
- 15 Anti-aircraft Regiment in Gołdap
- 34th Radioactive Battalion in Modlin
- 14th Reconnaissance Battalion School in Giżycko
- 48th Special Company in Kraków

=== 1997 ===
The command had the following organizational structure in 1997:

- 1st Mechanised Division in Legionowo
- 15th Mechanised Division in Olsztyn
- 16 Mechanized Division in Elbląg
- 2nd Sappers Brigade in Kazuń
- 1st Artillery Brigade in Węgorzewo
- 2nd Territorial Defense Brigade in Mińsk Mazowiecki
- 49th Combat Helicopters Regiment in Pruszcz Gdanski
- 9th Command Regiment

== Commanders ==
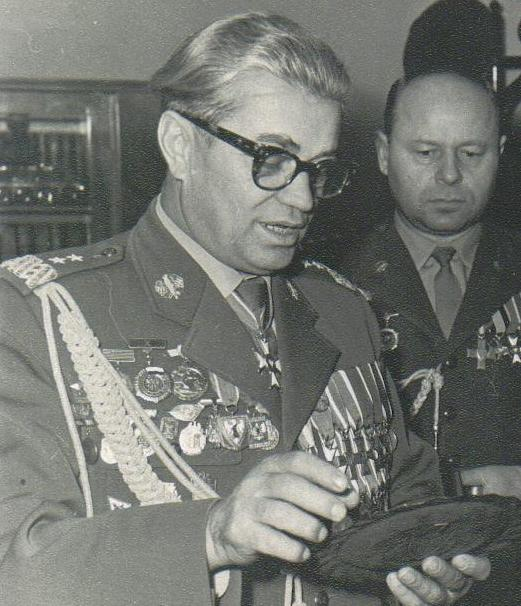
Divisional General Czesław Waryszak

- Brigadier General Włodzimierz Nałęcz-Gembicki (1945)
- Divisional General Bruno Olbrycht (1945–1946)
- Divisional General Gustaw Paszkiewicz (1946–1948)
- Divisional General Wsiewolod Strażewski (1948–1949)
- Divisional General Jan Rotkiewicz (1949–1953)
- Brigadier General Franciszek Andrijewski (1953–1956)
- Divisional General Józef Kuropieska (1956–1964)
- Divisional General Czesław Waryszak (1964–1968)
- Divisional General Zygmunt Huszcza (1968–1972)
- Brigadier General Michał Stryga (1972)
- Divisional General Włodzimierz Oliwa (1972–1983)
- Divisional General Jerzy Skalski (1983–1987)
- Divisional General Jan Kuriata (1987–1989)
- Divisional General Zdzisław Stelmaszuk (1989–1990)
- Brigadier General Leon Komornicki (1990–1992)
- Divisional General Julian Lewiński (1992–1997)
- Divisional General Adam Rębacz (1997–1998)

== See also ==
- Operational structure of the Polish Land Forces
- Warsaw Military District (Russian Empire)
- Dowództwo Okręgu Korpusu
