= 1st Mechanised Division (Poland) =

Former Polish military formation

1st Warsaw Mechanised Division
- 1 Warszawska Dywizja Zmechanizowana
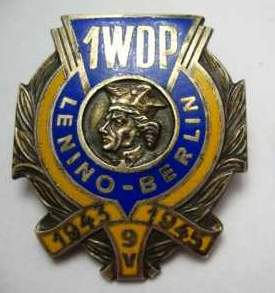
- Active: 1955-2011
- Country: Poland
- Role: mechanized infantry
- Garrison/HQ: Legionowo
- Nickname: Warsaw
- Patron: Tadeusz Kościuszko

The 1st "Warsaw" Mechanised Division (Polish: 1 Warszawska Dywizja Zmechanizowana) was a mechanized infantry formation of the Polish Land Forces that existed from 1955 until September 1, 2011. During this entire stretch, the division was headquartered in Legionowo. The unit stood down in 2011 as a result of reorganizations in the Polish Army.

The division was formed in 1955 on the basis of the 1st Infantry Division of the Polish People's Army. This precursor division had existed since 1943 and saw service on the Eastern Front of the Second World War as a Soviet-controlled allied formation, part of the Polish Armed Forces in the East.

== Structure ==
The 1955 reorganization equipped the division with armored personnel carriers and medium tanks. The division was initially structured and quartered as:

Division Headquarters and 37th Headquarters Company - Legionowo

- 1st Mechanised Infantry Regiment - Legionowo
- 2nd Mechanised Infantry Regiment - Skierniewice
- 3rd Mechanised Infantry Regiment - Ciechanów
- 33rd Medium Tank Regiment - Zambrów
- 1st Howitzer Artillery Regiment - Garwolin
- 4th Anti-Aircraft Artillery Battalion - Skierniewice
- 5th Rocket Artillery Battalion - Legionowo
- 14th Reconnaissance Battalion - Zambrów
- 42nd Motor Transport Battalion - Legionowo
- 53rd Medical Battalion - Skierniewice
- 96th Sapper Company - Legionowo
- 110th Signal Company - Legionowo

After the fall of communism in Poland, the units of the army were organized to reflect NATO practice. Thus, by 2009, the division was structured and quartered as:

Division Headquarters and 1st Headquarters Battalion - Legionowo

- 1st "Warsaw" Armoured Brigade - Warsaw
- 3rd Legion Mechanised Infantry Brigade - Lublin
- 21st Podhale Rifles Brigade - Rzeszów
- 1st Artillery Regiment - Ciechanów
- 15th Anti-Aircraft Artillery Regiment - Gołdap
- 1st Reconnaissance Battalion - Siedlce
- 15th Sapper Battalion - Orzysz
- 1st Supply Battalion - Legionowo
- 1st Maintenance Battalion - Łomża
- 1st Chemical Company - Siedlce

The division provided cadres for rotations V and IX for the Polish component of Multi-National Division Central South.

Notably, under the 2009 organization, the units of the division were geographically further from one another than the original deployments of 1955.

For most of this time, the division was subordinated to the Warsaw Military District. As part of ongoing reorganization of the Polish Army, the 1st Mechanised Division stood down on September 1, 2011.

== Sources ==
- Jerzy Kajetanowicz, Wojsko Polskie w Układzie Warszawskim 1955-1985, 7 November 2009. On-line here

This article is based on the Polish Wikipedia article of the same name as it existed on October 30, 2011.
