= Petőfi =

Petőfi may refer to:

- Sándor Petőfi (1823–1849), a Hungarian poet and revolutionary
  - Petőfi Bridge
  - Petőfi Csarnok ("Petőfi Hall")
  - Dem Andenken Petőfis (Hungarian: Petőfi szellemének, "In Petofi's Memory"), a piece for piano by Ferenc Liszt
  - Petőfi '73, a 1973 Hungarian drama film directed by Ferenc Kardos
  - 4483 Petöfi, a main belt asteroid
  - National Peasant Party (Hungary), a short-lived 1956 revival of a Hungarian political party under the name Petőfi Party
- Count Petofi, a fictional character in the TV drama Dark Shadows
