= Public holidays in Hungary =

A number of public holidays and special events take place each year in Hungary.

== Fixed public holidays ==
=== Article J of the Constitution of Hungary on national holidays ===
(1) The national holidays of Hungary shall be:

a) the 15th day of March, in memory of the 1848 Revolution and War of Independence,

b) the 20th day of August, in memory of the state's founding and its founder King Saint Stephen,

c) the 23rd day of October, in memory of the 1956 Revolution and War of Independence.

(2) The official state holiday shall be the 20th day of August.

=== List of public holidays ===
Date	English name	Local name	Remarks
1 January	New Year's Day	Újév	
15 March	1848 Revolution Memorial Day	1848-as forradalom ünnepe	Memorial Day of the 1848 Revolution (which aimed at the independence of the Hungarian Kingdom from the Austrian Empire). There are usually speeches and music such as the Nemzeti dal; many people wear a cockade with the national colours red, white, and green.
Moveable	Good Friday	Nagypéntek	Good Friday is a public holiday since 2017.
Moveable	Easter Monday	Húsvéthétfő	Men visit women to sprinkle them with perfume (or in the countryside, sometimes water), first asking permission by reciting a verse. In return, the women give the men eggs (sometimes painted, sometimes chocolate). Children receive chocolate eggs (sometimes fruits and nuts, chocolate rabbits), from the Easter Bunny; these gifts are sometimes hidden in the garden or house. (Real rabbits are sometimes gifted.) The day's meal is often ham, eggs, sweetbreads, and horseradish for breakfast.
1 May	Labour Day	A munka ünnepe	The countries of the EU are represented with special programmes, bridges are decorated and exhibitions are held. Labour Day coincides with May Day (majális); many attend outdoor festivities in public parks. Since 2004 it is also the anniversary of the accession to the EU.
Moveable	Whit Monday	Pünkösdhétfő	Monday after Pentecost
20 August	Saint Stephen's Day	Szent István ünnepe	Commemoration of Hungary's first king Saint Stephen's Day, also the day of the foundation of Hungary and "the day of the new bread". St. Stephen (Szent István király, ca. 975 – 15 August 1038), as the first king of Hungary, led the country into the Christian church and established the institutions of the kingdom and the church. He was canonized on 20 August 1083, and 20 August is his feast day in Hungary. Celebrated with a half-hour fireworks display on the bank of the Danube in the evening, watched from both river banks, the Buda hills, and the rooftops of Pest and Buda. Under the Hungarian People's Republic, 20 August was celebrated as the founding of the socialist republic. It is on this holiday that the highest number of state awards are conferred, including the Grand Cross of the Order of Saint Stephen of Hungary.
23 October	1956 Revolution Memorial Day	1956-as forradalom ünnepe	Memorial Day of the 1956 Revolution, which fought to expel Soviet troops from Hungary and establish free elections. Also the day of the proclamation of the Third Hungarian Republic (1989). Celebrated with speeches and exhibitions.
1 November	All Saints' Day	Mindenszentek	Day of remembrance of the dead. Family and friends decorate graves in Christian cemeteries.
25 December	Christmas Day	Karácsony	Public transport stops operating at about 4 pm on the 24th, Christmas Eve (Szenteste) as most families gather to celebrate, placing presents under a Christmas tree which has been decorated while the children are away from the house. Presents are then opened and a large meal eaten in celebration. On the 25th and 26th, people usually visit relatives.
26 December	Second Day of Christmas	Karácsony másnapja	

== Remembrance days endorsed by the state ==
Remembrance Days are working days in Hungary.

Date	English name	Local name	Remarks
19 January	Memorial Day for the Expulsion of Germans from Hungary	A magyarországi németek elhurcolásának emléknapja	On this day in 1946, the first train departed from Budaörs, carrying ethnic Germans from Hungary to Germany. It is an official state memorial day since 2012. .
22 January	Day of the Hungarian Culture	A magyar kultúra napja	The day of the Hungarian Culture, the day that Ferenc Kölcsey finished writing the Himnusz, the national anthem of Hungary. Hungarians celebrate it since 1989. It is an official state memorial day since 2022. .
1 February	Memorial Day of the Republic	A köztársaság emléknapja	Commemorating the law (1946. évi I. törvény) on the proclamation of the republic in 1946, memorial day since 2006.
25 February	Memorial Day for the Victims of the Communist Dictatorships	A kommunista diktatúrák áldozatainak emléknapja	On this day in 1947 Béla Kovács, Secretary-General of the Independent Smallholders' Party was arrested and deported to the Soviet Union. Memorial day since 2000, commemorations are held in high schools.
15 March	Day of the Hungarian Press	A magyar sajtó napja	It has been observed since 1990 to commemorate the printing of the first free products of the Hungarian press on this day in 1848: the 12 Points and the Nemzeti dal.
16 March	Day of the Hungarian Flag and Coat of Arms	A magyar zászló és címer napja	It is the memorial day of the adoption of Act XXI of 1848, which made the use of the national flag and the country's coat of arms mandatory for all public institutions and Hungarian ships on public holidays. Memorial day since 2014.
23 March	Hungarian–Polish Friendship Day	A magyar–lengyel barátság napja	The parliamentary resolution is built upon more than a millennium of close historical and cultural ties between the two nations. This spans from dynastic relations (the House of Árpád and the Piast dynasty), through the Polish heroes of the 1848–49 War of Independence (e.g., József Bem), all the way to the events of 1956 in Poznań and Budapest. Memorial day since 2007.
16 April	Memorial Day for the Victims of the Holocaust	A holokauszt áldozatainak emléknapja	On this day in 1944 the Jews of Subcarpathia were rounded up and forced into ghettos. Memorial day since 2001, commemorations are held in high schools.
6 May	Day of Hungarian Sport	A magyar sport napja	On this day in 1875, the Hungarian Athletic Club (MAC) organized the continent's very first outdoor athletic and boxing sports competition in Budapest, on the grounds of today's Liberty Square. On this day, the State Secretariat for Sport presents the most prestigious state sports awards to outstanding athletes, coaches, and professionals. Memorial day since 2000.
21 May	Day of National Defense	A honvédelem napja	On this day in 1849, the troops of Artúr Görgei recaptured Buda. It has been a memorial day since 1992.
The last Sunday of May	Memorial Day of Hungarian Heroes	Magyar hősök emlékünnepe	In 2001, the National Assembly passed Act LXIII of 2001. According to the text of the law, it commemorates all those men and women who, since the Hungarian conquest, fought with or without weapons in defense of the Hungarian nation, or sacrificed their lives for Hungary.
4 June	National Unity Day	A nemzeti összetartozás napja	Commemorating the anniversary of the signing of the Treaty of Trianon, when the Kingdom of Hungary lost 72% of its territory. National memorial day since 2010.
19 June	Day of Independent Hungary	A független magyarország napja	Commemorating the execution of the martyrs of the 1956 Hungarian Revolution (on 16 June 1958), and the anniversary of the end of the Soviet occupation of Hungary. Memorial day since 2001.
1 July	Semmelweis Day	Semmelweis-nap / A magyar egészségügy napja	On this day in 1818, Ignaz Semmelweis, the 'savior of mothers', was born in Buda. By discovering the cause of childbed fever and introducing mandatory handwashing with chlorinated lime, he revolutionized medicine and hospital hygiene worldwide. The Minister of Health presents the sector's highest state professional awards.
22 July	Memorial Day of the Siege of Belgrade	A Nándorfehérvári diadal emléknapja	On this day in 1456, the Christian forces led by John Hunyadi, John of Capistrano, and Michael Szilágyi inflicted a crushing defeat on the besieging armies of Ottoman Sultan Mehmed II. Hungarian military history regards this triumph as one of its most significant victories. Memorial day since 2011.
6 October	Memorial Day for the Martyrs of Arad	Az aradi vértanúk emléknapja	Commemorating the anniversary of the 1849 execution of the 13 Martyrs of Arad after the defeat of the Hungarian Independence War. National memorial day, commemorations are held in primary and high schools.
19 October	Hungarian–Bulgarian Friendship Day	A magyar–bolgár barátság napja	This day is connected to the feast day of Saint John of Rila, a saint of the Bulgarian Orthodox Church. Recognizing the shared religious and historical bonds, the parliaments of the two countries declared this day as the official celebration of national friendship in 2016.
3 November	Day of Hungarian Science	A magyar tudomány napja	On this day in 1825, at the Diet of Pressburg, Count István Széchenyi offered the full one-year income of his estates to establish the Hungarian Learned Society. This generous and patriotic gesture marked the beginning of the history of the Hungarian Academy of Sciences (MTA). Memorial day since 2003.
13 November	Day of the Hungarian Language	A magyar nyelv napja	On this day in 1844, Act II of 1844 on the Hungarian Language and Nationality was passed, making Hungarian the official state language. Memorial day since 2011.
25 November	Memorial Day of Soviet-Deported Hungarian Political Prisoners and Forced Labourers	A Szovjetunióba hurcolt magyar politikai rabok és kényszermunkások emléknapja	On this day in 1953, the first major group of political prisoners released from the Gulag camps arrived home. Starting from the autumn of 1944, approximately 600,000 Hungarians were deported to the Soviet forced labor camps as prisoners of war, internees, or based on fabricated charges for 'malenky robot'. Wreath-laying ceremonies and candle-lighting events are held nationwide. Memorial day since 2012.

== Holidays not endorsed by the state ==
Date	English Name	Local Name	Remarks
8 March	International Women's Day	Nemzetközi nőnap	Women get flowers and gifts from their employers and schoolchildren often bring gifts for their teachers.
First Sunday in May	Mother's Day	Anyák napja	Celebration honoring the mother of the family or individual, as well as motherhood, maternal bonds, and the influence of mothers in society. Mothers and grandmothers receive flowers and poems.
Last Sunday in May	Children's Day	Gyermeknap	Children and their parents are welcomed with nationwide programs, concerts, amusement parks, and family events.
Third Sunday in June	Father's Day	Apák napja	For honoring one's father, as well as fatherhood, paternal bonds, and the influence of fathers in society. Celebrated with family dinners and small gifts for fathers.
6 December	Santa Claus, Saint Nicholas Day	Mikulás, Télapó	On this day, Hungarian children polish their boots and put them in the window. Mikulás comes in the night and fills them with chocolates and/or small presents. If they were bad, they might get sticks instead.
31 December	New Year's Eve	Szilveszter	Young people go partying until morning. Streets are noisy with paper trumpets, hoots and the pop of champagne corks; people often wear masks and throw petards (despite them being outlawed). Those who stay home usually watch comedies made for the occasion; at midnight they drink champagne and wish each other good luck for the new year (BÚÉK). All Hungarian radio & television channels broadcast the national anthem at midnight, and then the President's speech. Firework displays are common. The next day streets are empty, and people sleep late (or sleep themselves sober). Lentils are eaten, symbolising coins for good luck.
Moveable	Carnival	Farsang	A six-day regional carnival, originally celebrated by the Šokci (ethnic-Croatians) living in the town of Mohács. Traditions include folk music, masquerading, parades and dancing.

== Defunct public holidays ==
Date	English Name	Local Name	Remarks
21 March	Day of the Proclamation of the Hungarian Soviet Republic	A Tanácsköztársaság kikiáltásának ünnepe	On this day in 1919, the Hungarian Soviet Republic was proclaimed in Budapest under the leadership of Sándor Garbai and Béla Kun. It was a public holiday until 1989.
4 April	Liberation Day	Felszabadítási Nap	During World War II in Hungary, the Soviet Red Army liberated Hungary from the Nazi German regime. Was celebrated until 1989
7 November	Great October Socialist Revolution	Nagy októberi szocialista forradalom	Throughout the existence of Communist rule in Hungary, the country celebrated the Russian Socialist Revolution commemorating the 1917 uprising by the Bolsheviks led by Vladimir Lenin. Celebrated simultaneously with the Soviet Union.

== Special events ==
Hungary's most notable annual events include the Budapest Spring Festival (mid-march to mid-April), Hortobágy Equestrian Days (late June), Sopron Early Music Days (late June), Festival in Budapest (late June), Miskolc Opera Festival (late June), Miskolc Kalálka International Folk Festival (July), Győr Summer Festival (late June), Győr Summer Cultural Festival (late June to late July), Pannon Festival in Pécs (July and August), Szentendre Summer Festival (July), Kőszeg Street Theatre Festival (late July), Savaria International Dance Competition in Szombathely (July), Debrecen Jazz Days (July), Szeged Open Air Festival (mid-July to August), Diáksziget (shorter: "Sziget" or "Sziget Festival", Student Island or Pepsi Island) north of Budapest (August), Eger Wine Harvest Festival (September), and Budapest Autumn Arts Festival (mid-September to mid-October).

St Stephen's Day (August 20) is celebrated with sporting events, parades and fireworks nationwide. On the same day there is a Floral Festival in Debrecen and a Bridge Fair in nearby Hortobágy. Formula 1 car races are held in early August at the Hungaroring near Mogyoród, 18 km northeast of Budapest.
