= Statues of Bogislaw X and Anna Jagiellon =

Monument in Szczecin, Poland

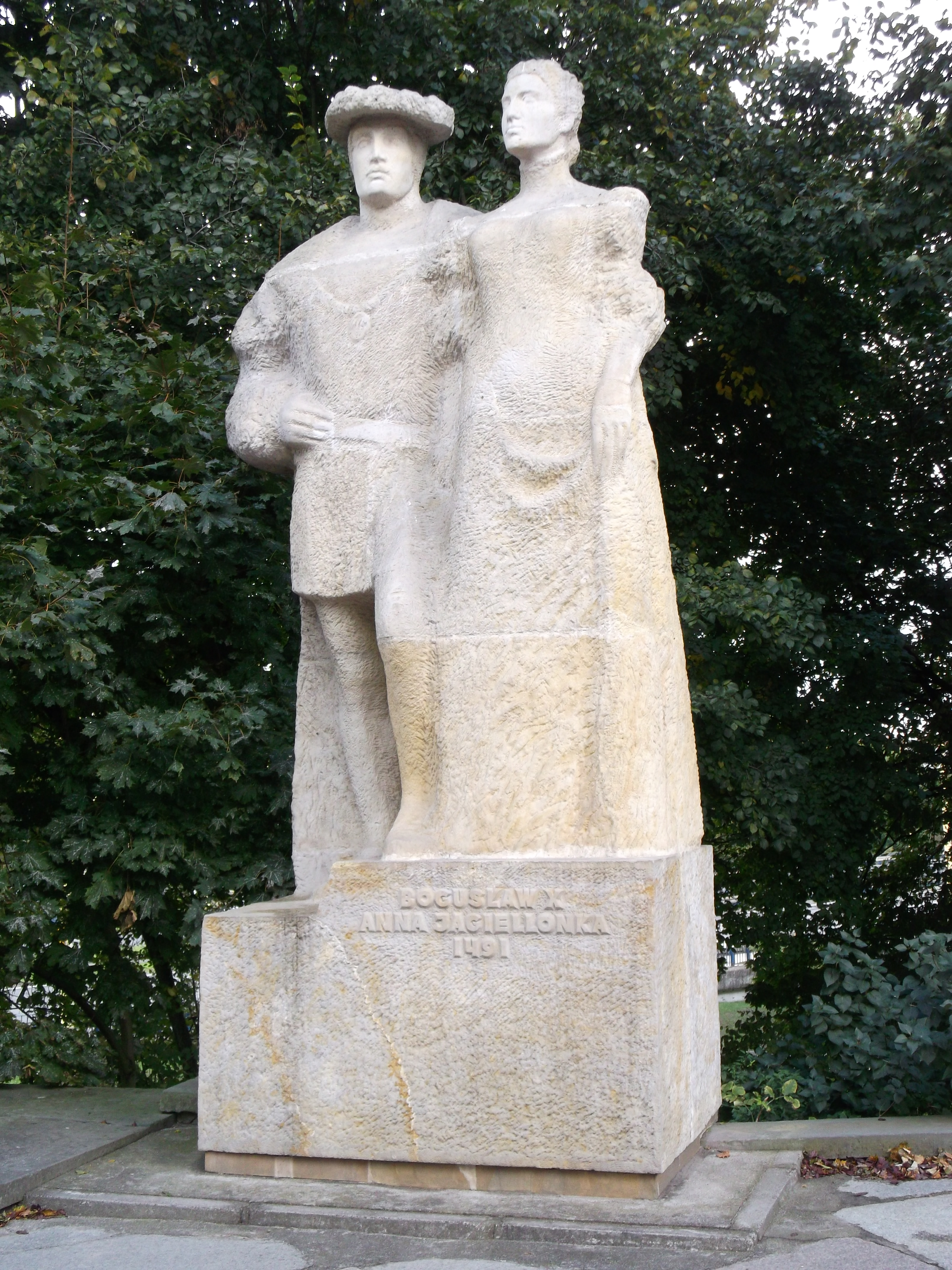
- The monument in 2012.
- Interactive map of Statues of Bogislaw X and Anna Jagiellon
- Location: 34 Korsarzy Street, Szczecin, Poland
- Coordinates: 53°25′37.13″N 14°33′34.5″E
- Designer: Leonia Chmielnik; Anna Paszkiewicz-Sawicka
- Type: Statues
- Material: Sandstone
- Height: c. 5.2 m (total); c. 3.8 m (statues)
- Beginning date: 1973
- Opening date: 22 July 1974
- Dedicated to: Bogislaw X; Anna Jagiellon

The statues of Bogislaw X and Anna Jagiellon (Polish: Pomnik Bogusława X i Anny Jagiellonki) is a monument in Szczecin, Poland, placed on Korsarzy Street in front of the Ducal Castle, within the neighbourhood of Old Town. It is dedicated to duke Bogislaw X (1454–1523), who unified the Duchy of Pomerania in 1478, and ruled it until 1523, and his wife, duchess Anna Jagiellon (1476–1503), who was the daughter of Casimir IV Jagiellon, the King of Poland and the Grand Duke of Lithuania. The two figures were chosen for the commemoration, to emphasize the historical connection of Poland to the region of Western Pomerania. The monument takes form of the sandstone statues depicting Bogislaw X and Anna Jagiellon. It was designed by Leonia Chmielnik and Anna Paszkiewicz-Sawicka, and unveiled on 22 July 1974.

== History ==
The monument is dedicated to duke Bogislaw X (1454–1523), who unified the Duchy of Pomerania in 1478, and ruled it until 1523, and his wife, duchess Anna Jagiellon (1476–1503), who was the daughter of Casimir IV Jagiellon, the King of Poland and the Grand Duke of Lithuania. The two figures were chosen for the commemoration, to emphasize the historical connection of Poland to the region of Western Pomerania.

The contest for the design of the monument was announced in 1969. Two entries, created by Leonia Chmielnik and Anna Paszkiewicz-Sawicka, respectively, were chosen as joint winners. Following the suggestion from the contest commission, both artists worked together on designing and creating the monument. The works on the design lasted several years, being delayed by the commission requiring several models and implementation of suggested changes. Due to the length of time it took, it was considered to abandon the project. The final project was submitted in 1971, and the monument was sculpted at its final location, in front of the Ducal Castle in Szczecin, from 1973 to 1974. The sandstone for its creation was sourced from a quarry in the town of Bolesławiec, now located in Lower Silesian Voivodeship, Poland. The sculpture was unveiled on 22 July 1974, during the celebrations of the National Day of the Rebirth of Poland, which marked the 30th anniversary of the signing of the Manifesto of the Polish Committee of National Liberation.

In the year 2000, the texture of the monument was partially damaged during the cleaning. In 2024, a short documentary film, titled Babska sprawa, was made by Helena Kwiatkowska and Marta Płachta, depicting the history and process of the creation of the monument, with the participation of Chmielnik and Paszkiewicz-Sawicka.

== Characteristics ==
The monument is placed on Korsarzy Street, in front of the north-western corner of the Ducal Castle in Szczecin, near its Bell Tower. It takes a form of a sandstone statues depicting Bogislaw X (1454–1523), the ruler of the Duchy of Pomerania from 1478 to 1523, placed on the left, and his wife duchess Anna Jagiellon, placed on the right. They face towards the city centre. Bogislaw X is dressed in royal robes, fastened with a belt, and with a long, floor-length cloak drapped over his shoulder, and with a flat headdress covers his head. A chain with a medallion, a symbol of his ducal status, hangs from his chest. Anna Jagiellon is dressed in a long, floor-length one-piece dress. She is depicted to have the same height as Bogislaw X, despite in realty being much shorter from him, to enthesis her royal status as the daughter of Casimir IV Jagiellon, the King of Poland and the Grand Duke of Lithuania. The side of the pedestal, that she is depicted standing on, is additionally slightly more elevated than the side of Bogislaw X, making her appear taller than him. The stateus are placed on a sandstone pedestal with rectangular base, which front side bears a Polish inscription which reads: "Bogusław X; Anna Jagiellonka; 1491", and translates to "Bogislaw X; Anna Jagiellon; 1491". The monument has the total height of around 5.2 m, while the statues measure at around 3.8 m.
