= Júlia Szendrey =

Hungarian poet, writer, translator (1828–1868)

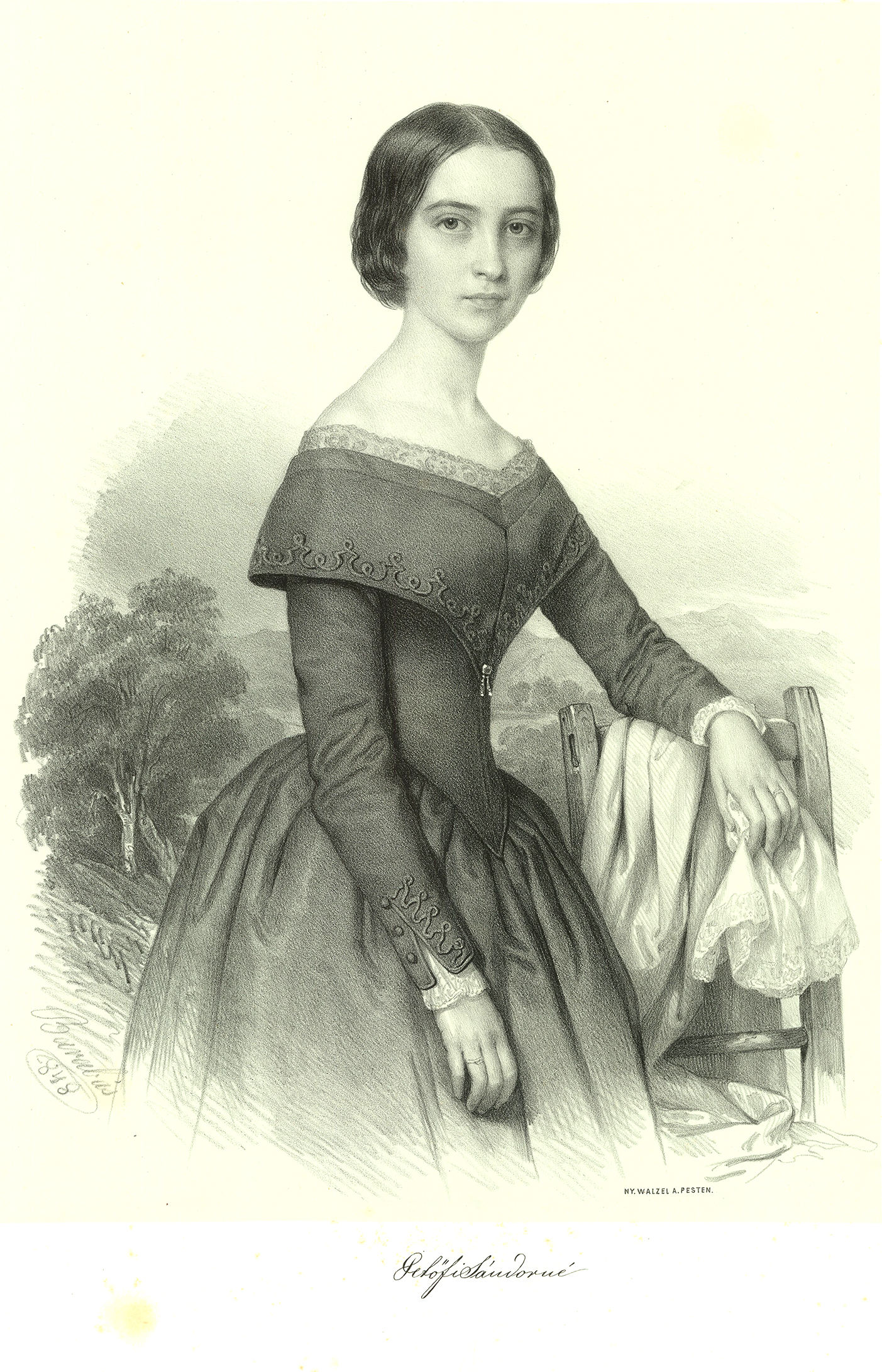
- Born: 29 December 1828; Keszthely, Kingdom of Hungary
- Died: 6 September 1868 (aged 39); Pest, Austria-Hungary
- Resting place: Kerepesi Cemetery
- Occupations: writer, translator, poet
- Spouse(s): Sándor Petőfi (m. 1847–1849) Árpád Horvát (m. 1850–1868)
- Children: 5
- Writing career
- Language: Hungarian

Júlia Szendrey (29 December 1828 – 6 September 1868) was a Hungarian poet, writer and translator, most known as the wife of celebrated Hungarian poet Sándor Petőfi.

== Life and works ==
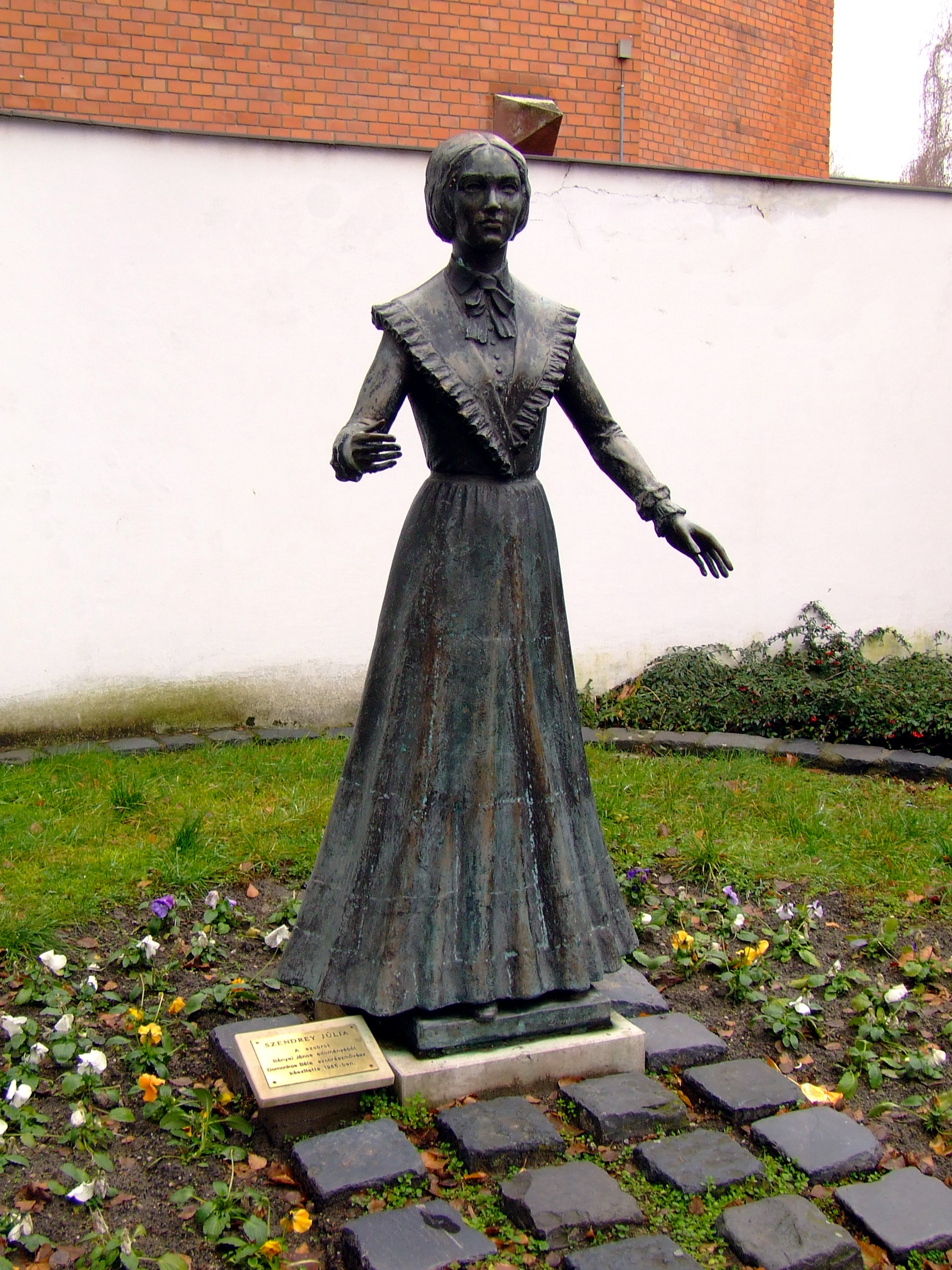
Szendrey's statue in Kiskőrös

Júlia Szendrey was born in Újmajor, Keszthely, her father was Ignác Szendrey (1800–1895), a farm overseer for various noble families during his career, including the Festetics family and the Károlyi family. Her mother was Anna Gálovics. She spent four years studying in Pest at an institute for daughters of affluent families. She was fluent in foreign languages, played the piano and liked dancing, however, she was not fond of parties and showing her skills to others. She was happiest reading poems and books, of Heinrich Heine, George Sand and the like.

As she was an educated lady, fond of literature and poetry, she immediately fell in love with Sándor Petőfi, when they met in Nagykároly in 1846. Despite opposition from her family, the couple got married a year later in Erdőd. As the Hungarian Revolution of 1848 broke out, Petőfi also joined the army, and moved his family to Debrecen. Their son, Zoltán was born on 15 December 1848.

When Petőfi disappeared during the war, and then was reported dead, Szendrey was incapable of accepting it. She traveled to Transylvania to look for him, and also applied for a passport to Turkey, should her husband be there. As she was denied traveling abroad, in despair, she turned to a trustworthy friend, historian Árpád Horvát. They got married in 1850, which was then frowned upon and for decades, Szendrey was stigmatized for her decision to remarry, and also for various rumours surrounding her behaviour, fuelled by writings and poems of well-known literary figures like János Arany. She possibly married him looking for protection. Decades after her death, her long lost diary was recovered and partially published, dispelling previous accusations.

Szendrey bore four children for Horvát, while her relationship with her first-born son Zoltán deteriorated, as the young man was increasingly living his life like his father, Petőfi did. He eventually died very young from tuberculosis, in 1870. In the 1850s, Szendrey wrote several poems, a diary and she translated several of Hans Christian Andersen's tales.

Her second marriage also ended in tragedy. She was diagnosed with cervical cancer, and suddenly in 1867 she decided to separate from her husband and moved to a small apartment in Pest, financed by her father. In her diary, she wrote that her second husband was not loyal to her, and he forced her to do her "conjugal duty" even after a doctor warned him that she was sick. She died in that small apartment in 1868, on her deathbed she dictated a letter to her father that read, "Father said I would be unhappy with Sándor. A woman has not yet experienced such happiness that I felt when I was together with my Sándor. I was his queen, he adored me and I adored him. We were the happiest couple in the world, and had fate not intervened, we would still be so."

After reading her letter, where she confessed of the wrongdoings of her husband, her father did not allow Horvát to bury her, he himself arranged the funeral. 60 years after Petőfi's death, she was laid to rest with the rest of the Petőfi family members in Kerepesi Cemetery, the inscription on the tomb includes her birth name and identifies her as Sándor Petőfi's wife, even though she died as Árpád Horvát's spouse.

== Memorials ==
There are several statues of Júlia Szendrey in Hungary, for example in Kiskőrös and in Mezőberény. In 2018, her statue was erected in Copenhagen at the Hungarian embassy building.
