= Stadionul Național (1953) =

Romanian multi-purpose stadium

Coordinates: 44.437°N 26.152°E

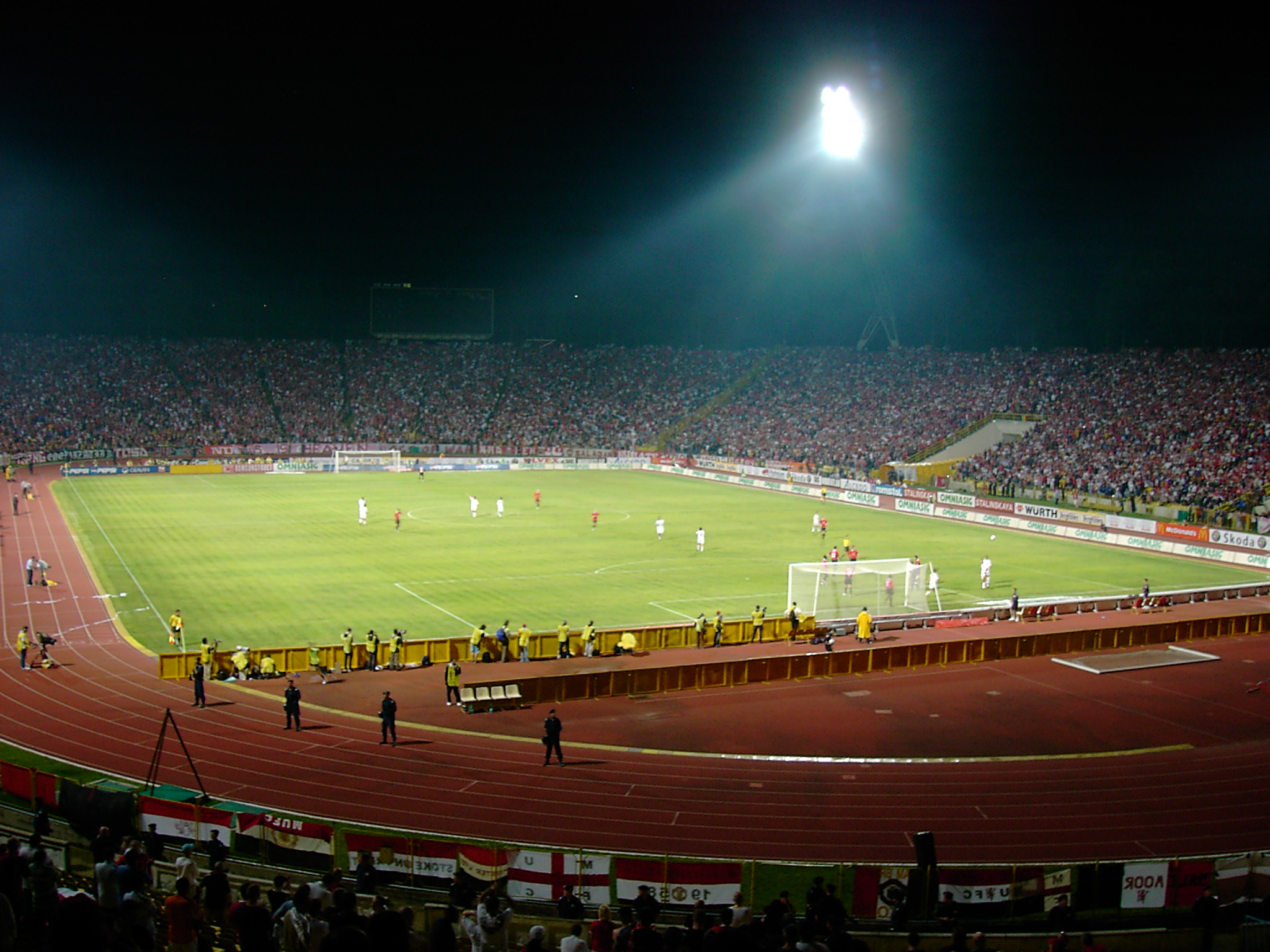
- Interactive map of Stadionul Național
- Former names: Stadionul 23 August (1953–90)
- Location: Bucharest, Romania
- Owner: Municipality of Bucharest
- Operator: Romania national football team
- Capacity: 60,120 (football, rugby); 70,000 (concerts)

Construction
- Built: 1953
- Opened: August 2, 1953
- Closed: November 22, 2007
- Demolished: December 18, 2007 – February 20, 2008

Tenants
- Romania national football team Steaua București (some matches); Dinamo București (some matches)

Stadionul Național (Romanian pronunciation: [stadiˈonul natsi.oˈnal]; "The National Stadium") was a multi-purpose stadium in Bucharest, Romania. The stadium held 60,120 people.

It was also used for many events such as 2050 de ani de la crearea statului dac centralizat, Liberation from Facist Occupation Day (23 August), televised propaganda events, and Cîntarea României.

== History ==
It was built in 1953, for the 4th World Festival of Youth and Students. According to the book București published in 1968 by Institutul Proiect București, Complexul Sportiv August 23 was designed by the well known architect Vily Juster.

It was first known as Stadionul 23 August, and later on as Stadionul Național. The sports complex that included Național Stadium, is named Lia Manoliu (1932–1998) after the famous Romanian athlete.

It was used mostly for football matches.

It hosted numerous concerts after the 1989 Revolution, including Michael Jackson's Dangerous World Tour concert on October 1, 1992 where 90,000 fans attended, as well as the HIStory World Tour concert on September 14, 1996 where 70,000 fans attended.

In October 2005, it was decided to rebuild the stadium completely; however, initially no funding was found, so some repairs proceeded in lieu of rebuilding. Later, funds became available and the rebuilding is expected to begin in November 2007. The plan calls for completion of a new five-star arena by April 2010. The last football match played was a 6–1 win against Albania on November 21, 2007. After the match, a few seats were removed from the stadium, as a symbolic start of the rebuilding operations. The stadium has subsequently been demolished to make room for a new one.

== Attendance ==
List of matches of Romania national football team on National Stadium (former August 23), with more than 50,000 persons.

Date	Home team	Score	Away team	Attendance	Ref
September 28, 1955	Romania	1–0	Belgium	90.000	
October 26, 1958	Romania	1–2	Hungary	90.000	
September 18, 1955	Romania	2–3	East Germany	90.000	
November 16, 1969	Romania	1–1	Greece	62.577	
October 25, 1953	Romania	0–1	Czechoslovakia	90.000	
May 29, 1955	Romania	2–2	Poland	80.000	
November 25, 1962	Romania	3–1	Spain	72.762	
May 30, 1965	Romania	1–0	Czechoslovakia	80.000	
May 12, 1963	Romania	3–2	East Germany	80.000	
May 22, 1960	Romania	0–2	Czechoslovakia	80.000	
May 14, 1972	Romania	2–2	Hungary	60.300	
April 16, 1983	Romania	1–0	Italy	80.000	
June 1, 1975	Romania	2–2	Scotland	52.203	
October 15, 1980	Romania	2–1	England	80.000	
November 3, 1957	Romania	3–0	Greece	54.465	
September 29, 1957	Romania	1–1	Yugoslavia	68.758	
November 8, 1959	Romania	1–0	Bulgaria	80.000	
August 2, 1959	Romania	0–0	Soviet Union	80.000	
November 2, 1958	Romania	3–0	Turkey	70.000	
October 9, 1955	Romania	1–1	Bulgaria	70.000	
October 12, 1969	Romania	1–0	Portugal	58.573	

Preceded by Estadio Olímpico Universitario; Mexico	Universiade; 1981	Succeeded by Commonwealth Stadium; Canada
