= Liberation Day (Hungary) =

National day

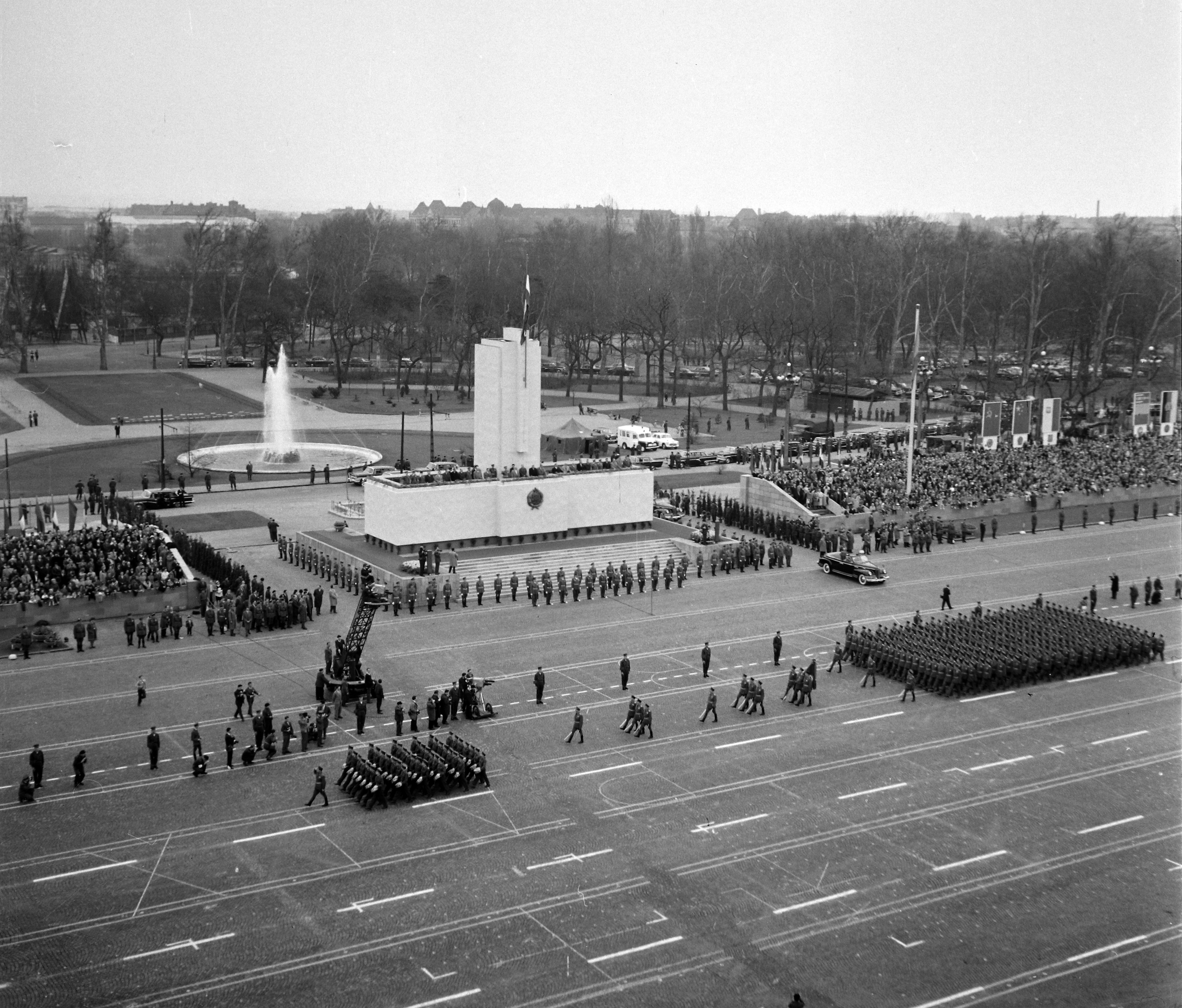
HPA personnel marching in the City Park during the 1964 Liberation Day parade

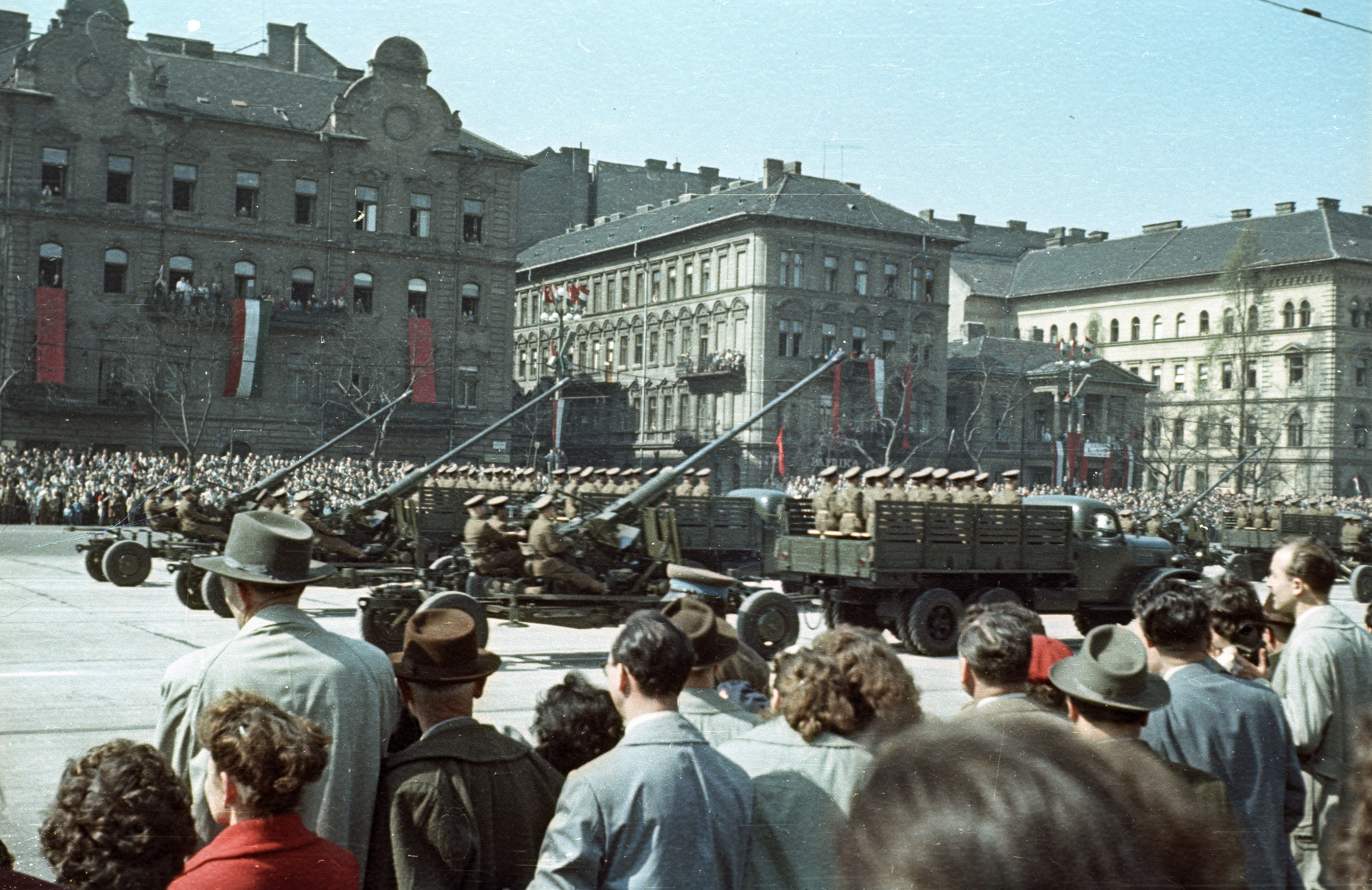
HPA artillery during the 1961 Liberation Day parade

The Liberation Day (Hungarian: Felszabadítási Nap) in Hungary was celebrated on 4 April, the anniversary of the exit of the last German Army units from Hungary on 4 April 1945, at the rear end of the Siege of Budapest and the broader Budapest offensive.

On 4 April 1950, the Presidential Council of the Hungarian People's Republic declared Liberation Day to be the main national holiday in the socialist republic. As the primary victorious power in Hungary in 1945 had been the Red Army of the Soviet Union, the commemoration of Soviet forces fit into the governing ideology of the Soviet-aligned Hungarian People's Republic. Holiday celebrations were held especially in the vicinity of Red Army graveyards in Hungary, dedicated to Soviet military personnel killed in action during the Soviet conquest of Hungary. Commemorative activities included ceremonial meetings, wreath laying ceremonies at the Memorial Stone of Heroes (Hősök emlékköve). Every 5 years, a military parade of the Hungarian People's Army would be held on Heroes' Square inside the City Park in honor of the holiday, the last of which being held in 1985 in the presence of General Secretary János Kádár, Defense Minister István Oláh and a Soviet delegation led by Vasily Kuznetsov.

With the end of communism in Hungary approaching, the Council of Ministers of the Hungarian People's Republic removed the holiday from among its public holidays in 1989 and was abolished in 1991, as the oppression inflicted by Soviet-aligned rule between 1945 and 1989 (especially during the crackdown of the Hungarian Revolution of 1956) was considered too severe to maintain the anniversary as a genuine "Liberation Day". Although no longer a state-endorsed holiday, groups of private individuals in Hungary still held commemorative events in Hungary after 1991, especially in the vicinity of Soviet memorials, such as near Liberty Square.

== See also ==
- Victory Day, in the Soviet Union and subsequently in Russia
- Liberation Day, in the Bulgarian People's Republic
- Liberation from Fascist Occupation Day, in the Romanian Socialist Republic
- National Day of the Rebirth of Poland, in the Polish People's Republic
