= 12 points of the Hungarian Revolutionaries of 1848 =

Demands from Hungarian Revolutionaries

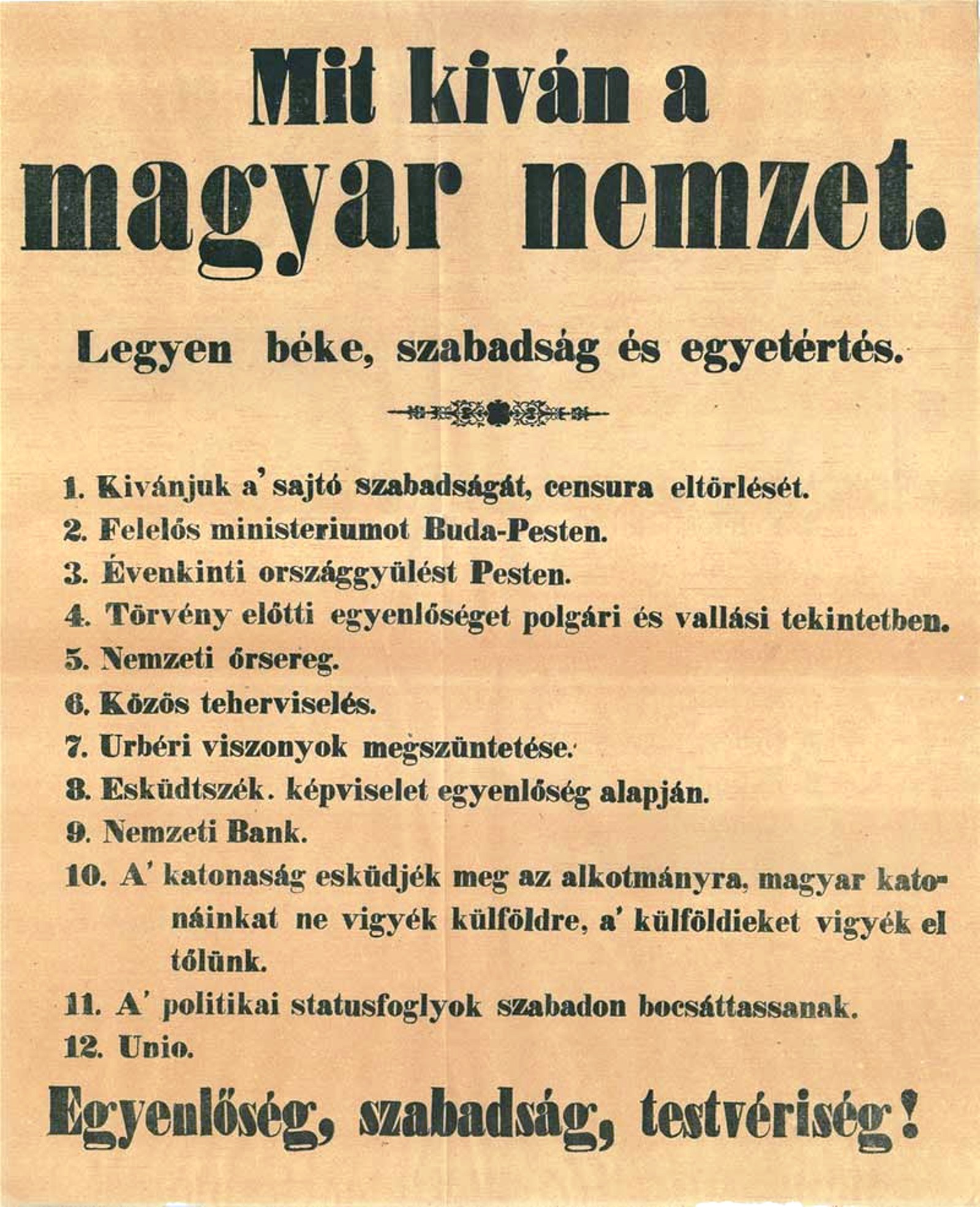
The original 12 points of 1848

The 12 points (Hungarian: 12 pont) were a list of demands written by the leaders of the Hungarian Revolution of 1848.

== History ==
On the morning of March 15, 1848, revolutionaries marched around the city of Pest, reading Sándor Petőfi's Nemzeti dal (National Song) and the 12 points to the crowd (which swelled to thousands). Declaring an end to all forms of censorship, they visited the printing presses of Landerer and Heckenast and printed Petőfi's poem together with the demands. A mass demonstration was held in front of the newly built National Museum, after which the group left for the Buda Chancellery (the Office of the Governor-General) on the other bank of the Danube. When the crowd rallied in front of the Imperial Governing Council, the representatives of Emperor Ferdinand agreed to sign the 12 points.

== Text ==
What the Hungarian nation wants.

Let there be peace, liberty, and concord.

1. We demand the freedom of the press, the abolition of censorship.
2. Independent Hungarian government in Buda-Pest.
3. Annual national assembly in Pest.
4. Civil and religious equality before the law.
5. National army.
6. Universal and equal taxation.
7. The abolition of socage.
8. Juries and courts based on an equal legal representation.
9. A national bank.
10. The army must take an oath on the Constitution, send our soldiers home and take foreign soldiers away.
11. Setting free the political prisoners.
12. Union [with Transylvania].

Equality, liberty, brotherhood!
