= Kiskőrös =

- Town
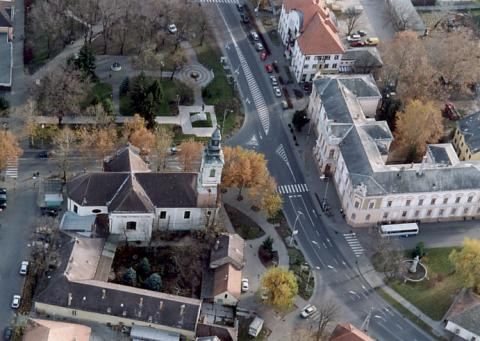
- Aerial view

- Coat of arms

- Location of Kiskőrös
- Coordinates: 46.62038°N 19.28381°E
- Country: Hungary
- County: Bács-Kiskun

Area
  - Total: 102.23 km^{2} (39.47 sq mi)

Population (2009)
  - Total: 14,452
  - Density: 143.3/km^{2} (371/sq mi)
- Time zone: UTC+1 (CET)
  - Summer (DST): UTC+2 (CEST)
- Postal code: 6200
- Area code: 78
- Website: Official website

Kiskőrös (Slovak: Malý Kereš / Kiškereš, German: Körösch, Croatian: Kireš) is a town in Bács-Kiskun, Hungary. Kiskőrös is situated between the Danube and Tisza rivers at around 46°37′14″N 19°17′19″E. Sándor Petőfi, the national poet of Hungary, was born here.

== Geography ==
Kiskőrös is the sixth biggest city in Bács-Kiskun county by population. It is located in the center of the county, 22 kilometres (14 miles) east from the river Danube and 110 km (68 mi) south of Budapest. About 2–3 km (1–2 mi) north of the town lies the nature reserve area (since 1974) of Szücsi Forest as part of the Kiskun National Park. The flora includes close to 300 protected plant species, one of them a special species of orchid, which blossoms here in April. Moreover, there are 98 registered, protected bird species. Many of them are songbirds that coexist with birds of prey like kestrels, sparrow-hawks and hobbies.

=== Climate ===
Kiskőrös has a continental climate combined with a high number of yearly sunlight. The hours of annual sunlight is over 2,000 hours.

== History ==
=== Prehistory and Ancient History ===
Kiskőrös has been populated since the Stone Age. In the first half of the second millennium BC it was populated by the Vatya-culture which developed around the central area of the Danube basin between 2000 and 1500/1400 BC. Archeologists unearthed 161 metal objects (11 of which were made of gold) in the vicinity of Kiskőrös in 2016, representing the biggest ever Middle Bronze Age found - both quantity and quality - in the areas between the Danube and Tisza (in Hungarian: Duna-Tisza köze). In addition to bronze and gold jewellery, daggers, spears, axes as well as goldsmith tools were found.

Celtic coins from the Late Iron Age (4th century B.C.) have also been found. In the first century Transdanubia (i.e. Pannonia) was invaded by the Romans and its population ran away and settled in the area. Archaeological evidence suggests that Scythian-Sarmatians were settled here along the border region, to protect the "limes", who continued to be present up to the 5th century AD. Seven Sarmatian cemeteries have been found so far within the perimiter of Kiskőrös. In the graves of a Jazig-Sarmatian cemetery a necklace of pearls in gold setting and other rare polished jewellery were found. In the 1930s five Avar villages and seven cemeteries have been discovered. The archeological findings strongly suggest a strong connection between the Sarmatians living in the area and the Roman provinces. Only a few relics were have been found from the Hun-period (420-454).

Nine Avar cemeteries have been dug so far. Their characteristic metal buckles with a griffin fitting are strikingly similar to those found in the Caucasus and along the River Volga. The most beautiful findings of all, a necklace of 5 oval almandine pendants in gold setting and 6 gold pendants were uncovered in a princes's grave.

=== Post-Roman History ===
The first written documents mentioning Kiskőrös date back to 1277 issued by the "Kuman" László IV and referred to as "Keurus". By 1433 Kőrös was an independent town. The peaceful life of the town came to an end in the 16th century when the Turkish army occupied the region. A letter was written on 11 April 1529 by Mihály Pósa warning the bishop of Kalocsa about the attacks of the Turks. He informed the bishop that Kiskőrös was ruined by the Turks on 8 April, together with other settlements in the area. The town ceased to exist during the occupation and referred to as "puszta" (lat. desertum).

In 1702 documents show that the area was not fully uninhabited. The rebirth of Kiskőrös is the work of the Wattay family. For their contribution to defeat the Turks, Leopold I gave the family the land and the surrounding areas. On 19 May 1718, 700 Slovak farmers moved to Kiskőrös. The population has reached 5,000 by 1785. On 1 January 1823 Sándor Petőfi was born in Kiskőrös.

In the 20th century, Hungary lost both world wars and during the years of the Great Depression the economy of the village suffered greatly. Kiskőrös was occupied by the Soviet Army in 1944. After World War II, most of the town's income came from agriculture (wine and fruit production). In the 1950s, when drilling for oil, salty-iodous-brominous medicinal thermal water of 56 °C was found, forming the basis of the popular thermal bath and swimming pool. Kiskőrös began to develop rapidly in the 1970s and infrastructure, educational, healthcare and welfare institutions were built. Kiskőrös regained town status in 1973.

== Economy ==
The largest part of the economy is provided by the service sector (family enterprises) and agriculture (mainly related to winegrowing and fruits).

Wine

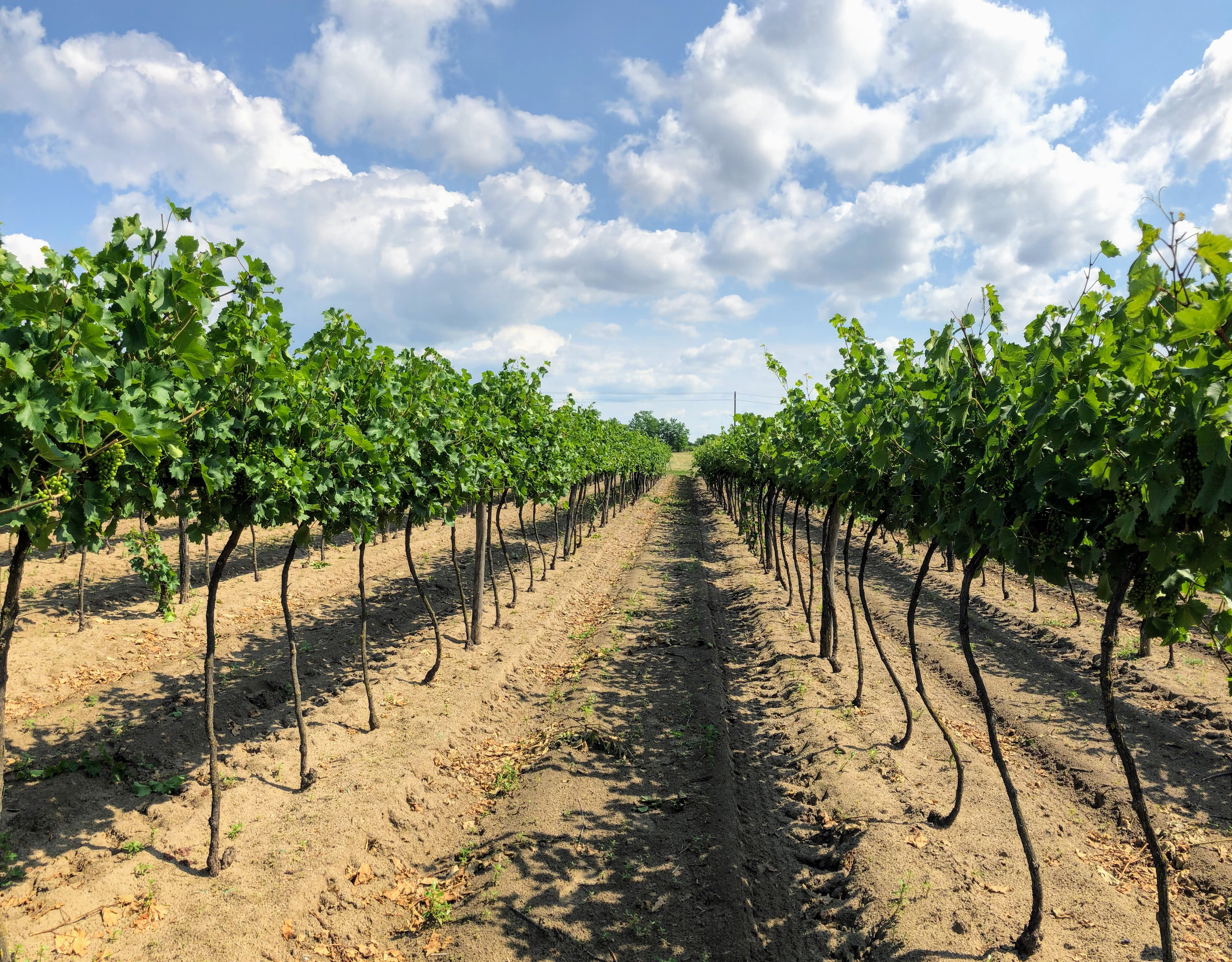
Vineyard in Kiskőrös

Kiskőrös is situated in the middle of Hungary largest wine producing region, the "Kunsági borvidék" and its history is intimately entwined with wine-making. The sandy soil and high sunshine hours provide the perfect conditions for grape. Viticulture in Kiskőrös is first mentioned in written documents from the XIII. century. For over 200 years there has been a deep tradition of grape production and winemaking in this region. As such, a large percentage of the town workforce has been devoted to the grape and wine industry. Kiskőrös is known for and the local population has strong ties to its wine-growing and winemaking. Winemaking in the town has been more or less a family-based business and multigenerational family winemaking has been an important part of the local culture and self-identity as well as a defining part of family tradition in many local families. The most well-known traditional grapes are: „Kövidinka” – “Ezerjó” – "Sárfehér", "Bianca" and the "Kadarka".

== Demographics ==
Kiskőrös had 15,348 residents in 2001. The population is homogeneous with a Hungarian majority. (95.8% Magyars, 3.1% Slovaks, 1.4% Romani, 0.7% Germans etc.). The distribution of religions were: 46.4% Lutheran, 27.5% Roman Catholic, 4.5% Calvinist etc.).

== Personalities ==
- Sándor Petőfi (1823–1849), a Hungarian national poet and liberal revolutionary.
- Jenő Lasztovicza (1961–2015), a Hungarian horticultural engineer, politician and member of the National Assembly.
- Melinda Vincze (born 1983), a Hungarian former handballer

== Buildings and structures ==
The museum at Sandor Petőfi's birth place is one of the most frequented museums in Kiskőrös. It has been a museum since 1880. Kiskőrös City Mayor's Office was built in 1893. East of Kiskőrös, there is a 150 metres (490 ft) tall concrete tower used for FM radio and television broadcasting.

== Twin towns – sister cities ==
Kiskőrös is twinned with:

- Krimpen aan den IJssel, Netherlands
- Lapua, Finland
- Liptovský Mikuláš, Slovakia
- Marghita, Romania
- Nesvady, Slovakia
- Stadtlengsfeld (Dermbach), Germany
- Tarnów, Poland
- Zhenjiang, China

== Gallery ==
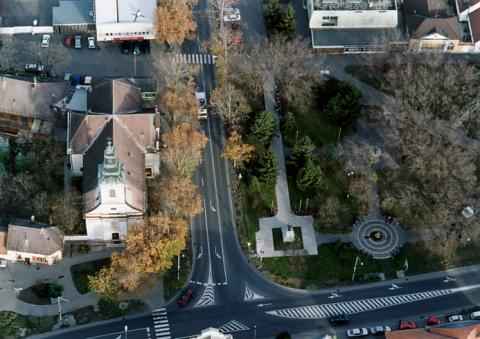

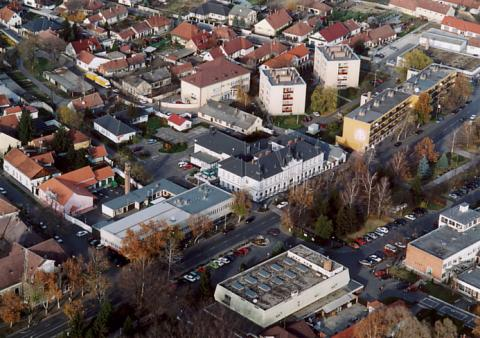
