= Liberation from Fascist Occupation Day =

Historic public holiday in Romania

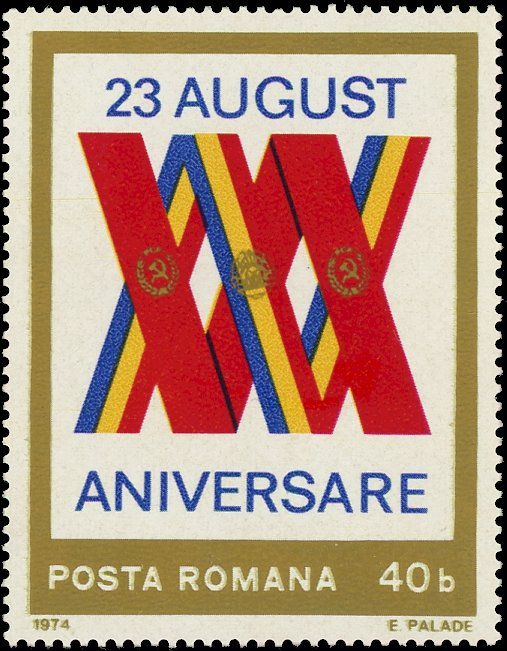
A 1974 stamp commemorating the 30th anniversary of Romania's "Liberation from Fascism"

Liberation Day, officially known as the Liberation from Fascist Occupation Day (Romanian: Ziua eliberării de ocupația fascistă) was observed on 23 August in Communist Romania to celebrate the 1944 Romanian coup d'état, the event that caused Romania to leave the Axis in World War II and marked the beginning of the Soviet occupation of Romania (styled by the regime as "liberation"). It coincides with the European Day of Remembrance for Victims of Stalinism and Nazism.

== History ==
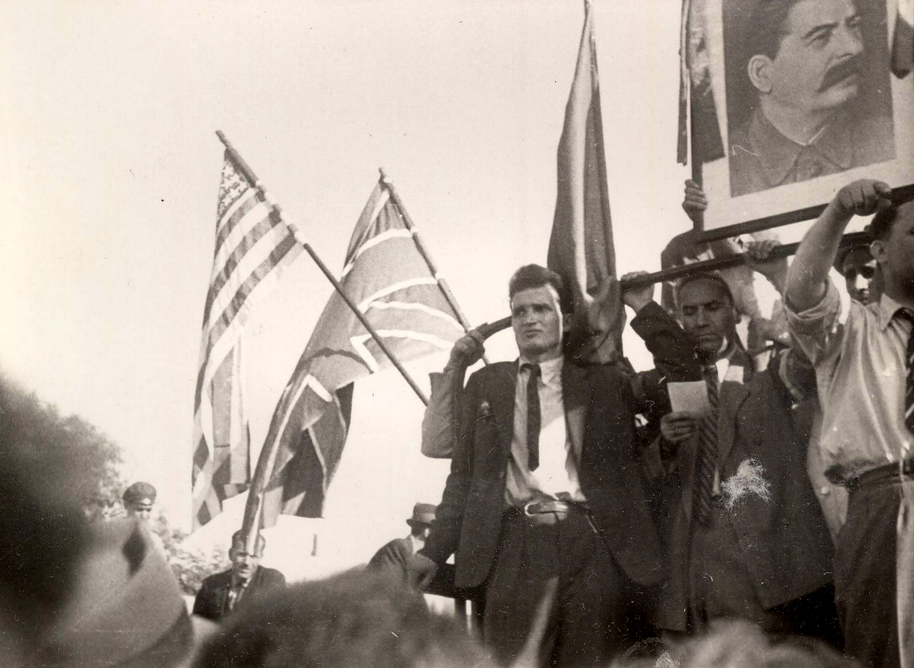
Nicolae Ceaușescu and other Romanian communists welcoming the Red Army as it passes through in Colentina, Bucharest, 30 August 1944

On 23 August 1944, King Michael I of Romania, alongside politicians from allied opposition parties (the Romanian Communist Party, the Social Democratic Party, the National Liberal Party, and the National Peasants' Party) led a coup against Romanian Conducător, Marshal Ion Antonescu, and his Nazi Germany-aligned fascist government. The successful coup as was organized days after the Red Army's Jassy–Kishinev offensive had broken through Romanian lines in the north-east of the country. The day after the coup, the Army Group Dumitrescu and the Romanian Fourth Army joined the Soviet 2nd and 3rd Ukrainian Fronts to fight the other Axis powers. By 30 August, Soviet troops reached Bucharest and restored the Soviet presence in the Moldavian SSR. On 12 September 1944, Romania signed the Moscow Armistice with the Allies, which confirmed the Soviet–Romanian border as it was on 1 January 1941. Romania later participated alongside the Red Army in the Soviet-led offensive into Hungary, Czechoslovakia, and Austria. The Soviet Army continued to have a presence in Romania until 1958.

== Observances ==
=== Socialist Republic of Romania ===
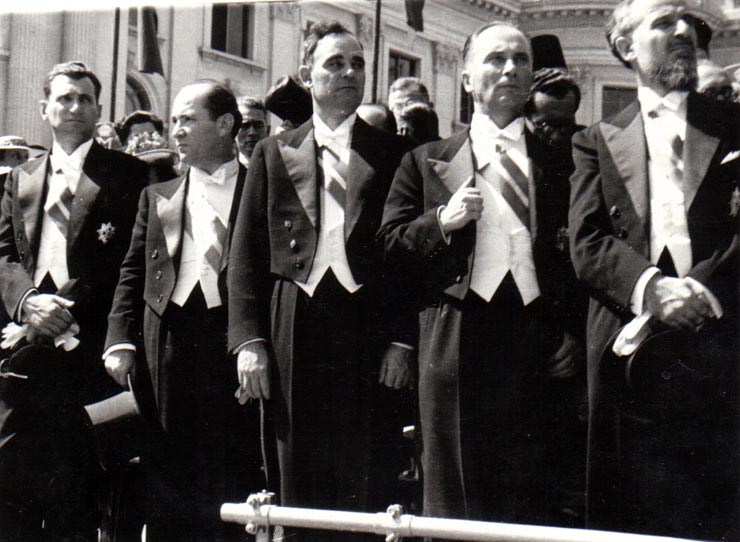
A moment during the first-ever August 23 Parade on Palace Square in 1945. Pictured are five ministers of the cabinet of Petru Groza (left to right): Lucrețiu Pătrășcanu, Teohari Georgescu, Gheorghe Gheorghiu-Dej, Lothar Rădăceanu, Ștefan Voitec.

The events of 23 August were held in high regard during the socialist era, with the 1952 Constitution of Romania referring to those events as the "Liberation of Romania by the Glorious Soviet Army". In honor of the event, the company that is now FAUR was named 23 August Works in 1948. In the Romanian People's Republic, Liberation Day was the main holiday of the state. It was declared a national holiday by the Resolution #903 of the Council of Ministers on 18 August 1949. Although relegated to secondary importance in favor of the International Workers' Day on 1 May during the 1950s, it became elevated to much greater importance in the 1970s during Ceaușescu's rule so as to emphasize the importance of Romania's contribution to the Allies' defeat of Nazi Germany. A grand military parade on Aviators' Square (now Charles de Gaulle Square) in the presence of the President of Romania and General Secretary of the Romanian Communist Party would be held annually, with large parades held on jubilee anniversaries. The parade was organized by the Romanian People's Army and featured infantry, navy, artillery, the Patriotic Guards, the Miliția and Troops of the Directorate for Security (Securitate) as well as military vehicles/aircraft such as the TR-85, Volkov missiles, the IAR 330 and the IAR-93 Vultur.

In 1984, on the 40th anniversary of liberation, the ceremonies were attended by the General Secretary of the East German SED Erich Honecker, Chinese President Li Xiannian, PLO President Yasser Arafat, Mozambican President Samora Machel, Zimbabwean President Robert Mugabe, and Pakistani President Muhammad Zia-ul-Haq as well as featured the medalists at the 1984 Summer Olympics. In 1989, the national day celebrations took place on Ştirbei Vodă Street past the Dâmbovița Center (also named Casa Radio), the balcony of which was used by Romanian dictator Nicolae Ceaușescu to watch the festivities in the last parade in Romania marking the 45th anniversary year of the coup.

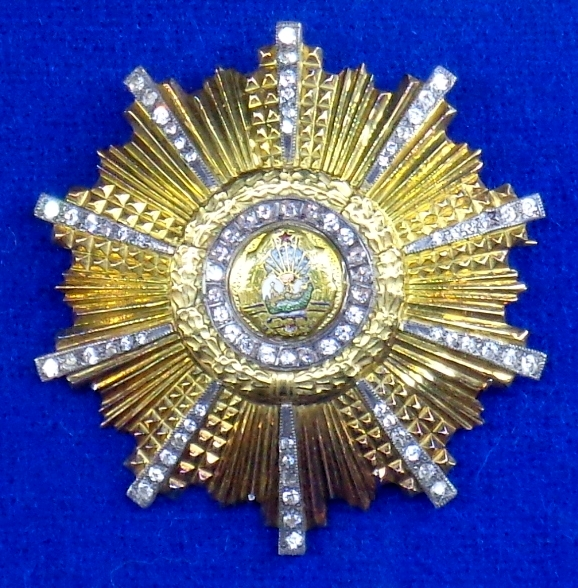
August 23 Order, 1st class

The August 23 Order (Romanian: Ordinul "23 August") was a Romanian decoration established by decree No. 190 of the State Council of the Romanian People's Republic on 3 June 1959. It was created to commemorate the events of 23 August, thus the first decorated persons were the participants in King Michael's Coup. Subsequently, it was granted to military and civilian personnel, as well as Romanian and foreign officials.

=== Since 1990 ===
The Law 10/1990, promulgated on 1 August 1990 by President Ion Iliescu, moved the national holiday to 1 December, the Great Union Day.

Since 2011, Romania has observed the European Union-wide Day for Commemoration of the Victims of Totalitarian and Authoritarian Regimes, commemorating the signing of the Molotov–Ribbentrop pact on this day in 1939 (which posteriorly resulted in Romania losing Bessarabia and Northern Bukovina, regions now part of Moldova and Ukraine and which had Romanian-majority communities). Liberation Day is still commemorated in its original form among the civilian population, and even in neighboring Moldova, where it is referred to as the Day of the Liberation of Moldova from Fascist Occupation.

== See also ==
- Public holidays in Romania
- Victory Day (9 May)
- Liberation Day (Bulgaria)
- Liberation Day (Hungary)
- National Day of the Rebirth of Poland
