= Sarfeher =

Variety of grape

Sarfeher is a white Hungarian wine grape planted primarily in the Great Hungarian Plain. In addition to making still, varietal wines Sarfeher is also used in sparkling wine production.
