= Dem Andenken Petőfis =

Composition for piano by Franz Liszt

Dem Andenken Petőfis (In Petőfi's Memory; its original Hungarian title was "Petőfi szellemének") is a piece for piano by Franz Liszt, who was a contemporary of Sándor Petőfi. Written in 1877, it is an elegy, like many of Liszt's works. This was written in memory of the Hungarian nationalist and poet Sándor Petőfi, whose poems Liszt sometimes set to music.

It was one of the ABRSM's grade 8 piano exam pieces in 2005–06.
