= National Day of the Rebirth of Poland =

Holiday in Poland

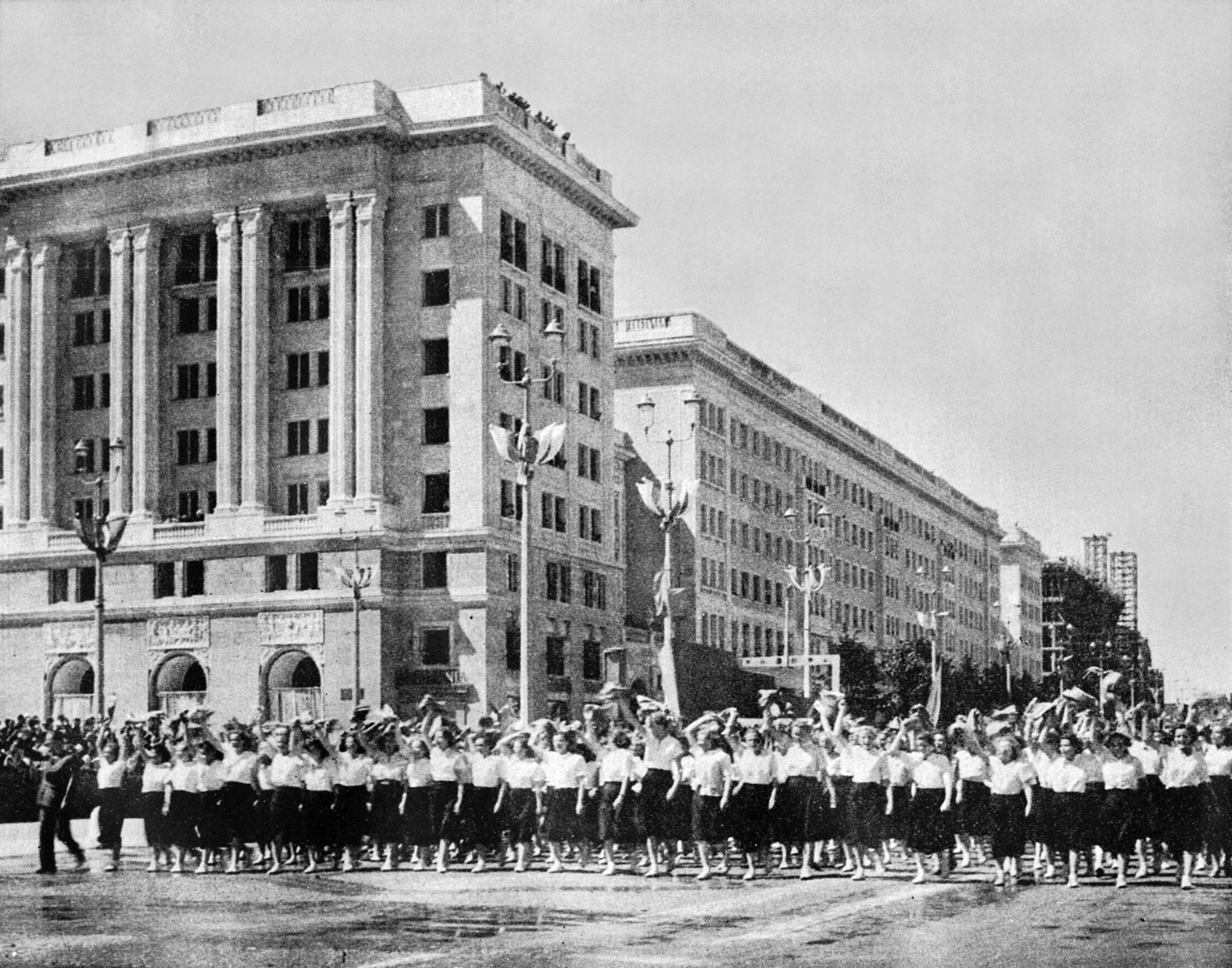
- Polish students on Plac Konstytucji during the holiday in 1952.
- Official name: Narodowe Święto Odrodzenia Polski
- Also called: National Day
- Observed by: Polish People's Republic
- Type: National
- Celebrations: Parades, Fireworks, Political Rallies
- Date: July 22
- First time: 1944
- Last time: 1989

National Day of the Rebirth of Poland (Polish: Narodowe Święto Odrodzenia Polski) is a former national holiday in the former People's Republic of Poland and a fraternal anniversary in the Polish United Workers' Party and all Polish communists, celebrated from 1944 to 1989. It commemorates the signing of the PKWN Manifesto on 22 July 1944.

== History ==
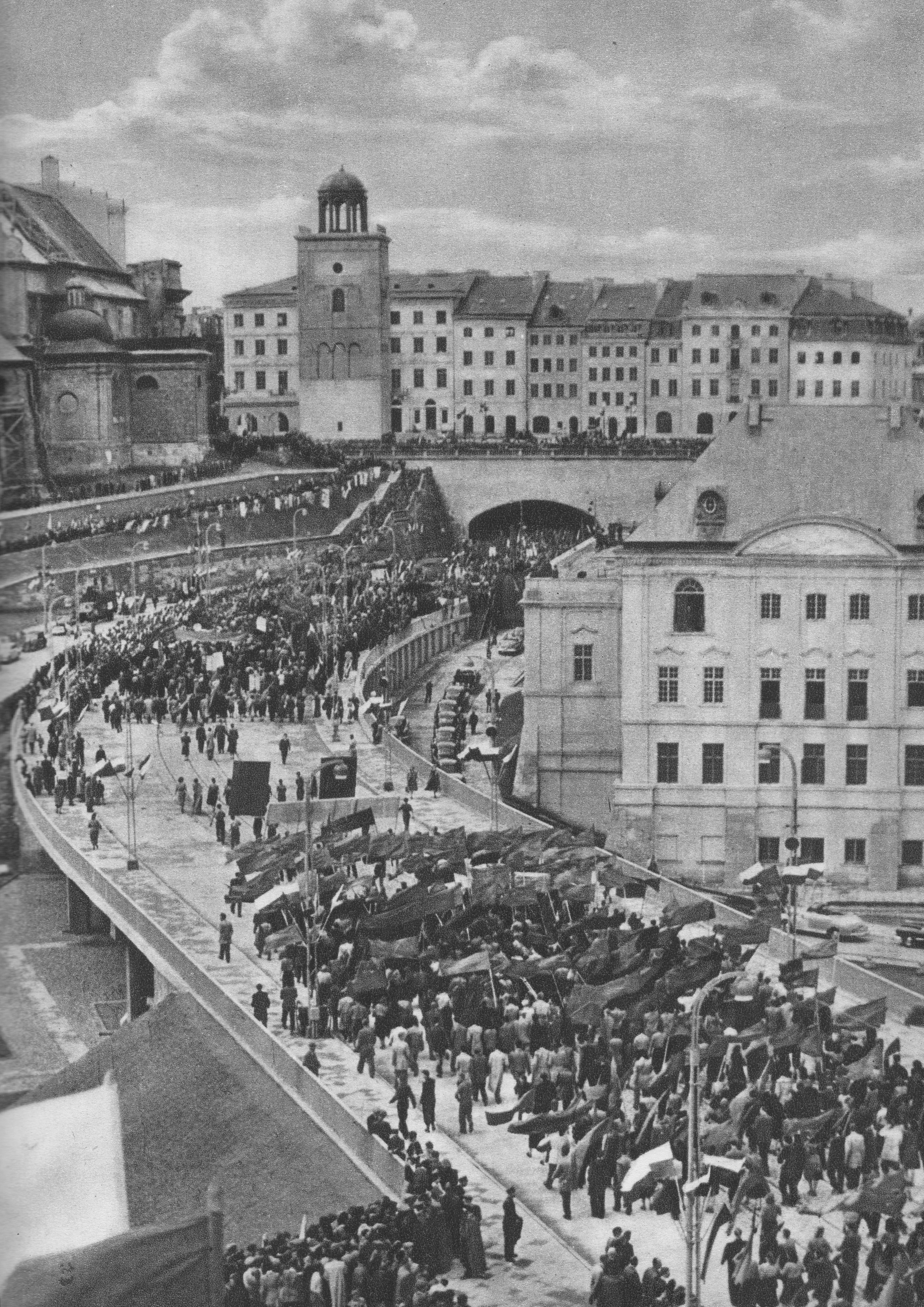
The 5 year anniversaries in Warsaw, 1949.

Known officially as the Manifesto of the Polish Committee of National Liberation, its writers were part of the Soviet-backed Polish government-in-exile in London known commonly by its acronym, the PKWN. The government of Stalin in the Soviet Union was originally critical of State National Council (KRN) until it developed ideas for Poland after the war and found it to be a catalyst for its plans. A delegation came to the Soviet capital of Moscow on 22 May 1944 for talks with Stalin and Foreign Minister Vyacheslav Molotov. This was the framework for the signing of the manifesto between the KRN and the Union of Polish Patriots in Chełm on 22 July. The document helped establish a mandate to assist in the liberation of occupied Polish territories from the ruling Military Administration and the General Government. It also condemned the April Constitution of Poland and Sanation movement as "fascist" and repealed it in favor of the 1921 March Constitution while urging support for the Red Army. It also was the official founding date for the exiled PKWN government installed in Lublin on 26 July under the KRN and later a cabinet under Prime Minister Władysław Raczkiewicz. On 31 December, the KRN replaced the PKWN into the Provisional Government of the Republic of Poland led by Edward Osóbka-Morawski.

The first anniversary was celebrated a year later and officially replaced the previous National Independence Day holiday on 11 November 1952. It was celebrated for the last time in 1989 as it was disestablished by the government on 28 April 1990.

== National observances ==
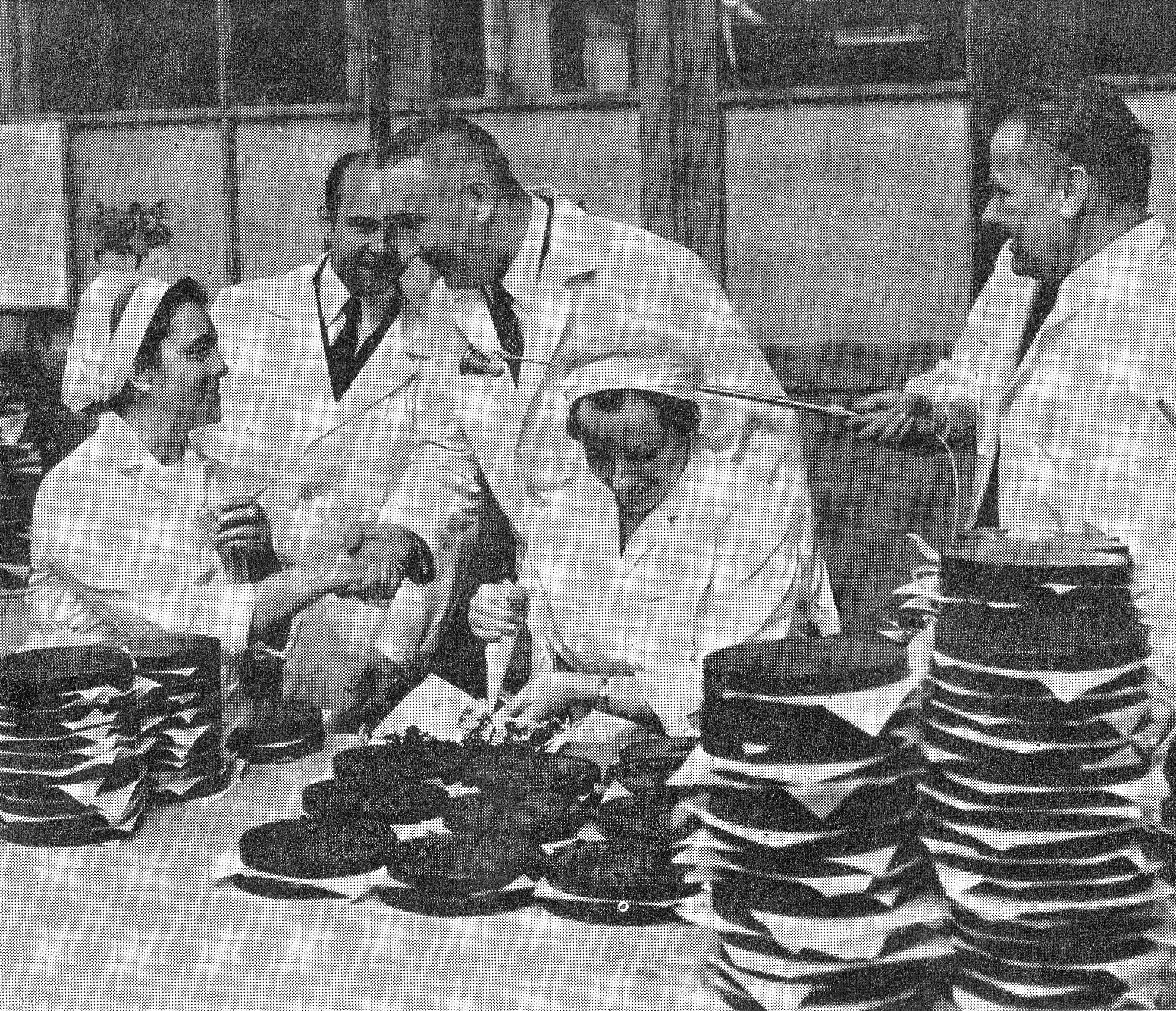
First Secretary Edward Gierek visiting workers in 22nd July Chocolate Factory, former E. Wedel.

The holiday was the most important of all public holidays in the People's Republic, with elaborate events and customs being held on this day. There were organized fairs, folk events, and many large investments conducted by the government. A wreath laying ceremony takes place at national monuments such as the Tomb of the Unknown Soldier on Victory Square.

=== PZPR and government events ===
A solemn meeting of the Polish Sejm and the PZPR Central Committee takes place on the morning or afternoon of the holiday. The Marshal of the Sejm is the keynote speaker in the former's case while the First Secretary of the Central Committee speaks at the latter event. All members of the PZPR Politburo are also on hand for the holiday. The First Secretary usually issued awards to distinguished individuals on the holiday. This occurred on the eve of the holiday in 1974 when Edward Gierek awarded Leonid Brezhnev with the Virtuti Militari, which also coincided with the latter's state visit to Warsaw that day. The award would later be revoked and declared invalid by the President of Poland on 10 July 1990.

=== Civil-military parade ===
Every year on this holiday, a military parade takes place before the party and state leadership in Warsaw and demonstrations by members of the working-class, patriotic organizations and working people were held in all districts and district capitals. The military parade takes place on Warsaw's Parade Square, which is in front of the monumental Palace of Culture and Science (PKiN).

Many anniversary parades have taken place in the holiday's history including on the following occasions:

- 1959 – Celebrated the Silver jubilee of the manifesto's signing. The parade was attended by Soviet Premier Nikita Khrushchev.
- 1966 – The Millennium Parade in honor of the anniversary of the Christianization of Poland which in the early 60s as well as that specific year. The parade inspector was Marshal of Poland Marian Spychalski while it was commanded by Major General Czesław Waryszak. Besides troops of the LWP being on parade, it also featured ceremonial units and cadets of military academies dressed in Polish historical military uniforms dating back to the Piast dynasty. The parade is today regarded as the largest military parade organized in the history of Poland.
- 1974 – Celebrated the 30th anniversary of the manifesto's signing. The parade was attended by Soviet General Secretary Leonid Brezhnev. It was inspected by General of the army Wojciech Jaruzelski and commanded by Major General Włodzimierz Oliwa.
- 1984 – Celebrated the Ruby jubilee of the manifesto's signing.

The big three figures who are on the grandstand in front of the palace are the First Secretary of the Polish United Workers' Party, the Prime Minister and the Chairman of the Council of State. The parade starts with the troops presenting arms to the tune of Poland Is Not Yet Lost performed by the Central Band of the Polish People's Army and the other bands that make up the massed bands of the Warsaw Garrison under the baton of the Senior Director of Music of the Bands of the Polish Armed Forces. A 21-gun salute is fired at this point.

After this the troops, still in the present arms position look to the right to await the arrival of the Minister of National Defence to receive the report from the Commander, Warsaw Military District. Once this is done, the minister and the commander greet the formations on parade in their respective cars with Czolem Żołnierzy (the Polish language version of Greetings Soldiers) while the inspection march (usually Marsz Generalski) plays in the background. After the inspection, the parade, after sloping arms, then executes order arms and stands at ease to listen to the minister's official speech. After the speech, a flypast of Polish Air Force aircraft takes place.

After the flyover, the parade commander orders the start of the parade in the following manner:

Parade... attention! Slope.... arms!
Distance by a single lineman!
The parade will now march off in quick time for the ceremonial past in review by battalions, Right... turn!
By your units, eyes to the right, by the left, forward, quick march!

Next, the parade car leading and the Representative Honor Guard Regiment of the Polish People's Army marching as the first contingent to the tune of Warszawianka. It is then followed by a combined colour guard holding historical Polish military colours from the Second Republic, the Spanish Civil War and the Second World War. Contingents from other agencies and units also march off, including the Milicja Obywatelska, the Wojska Ochrony Pogranicza, the General Staff Academy, the Dzerzhinsky Political-Military Academy, the Territorial Defense Forces and the Internal Military Service. After the ground column concludes, a mobile column of armoured units and the coastal defence troops and marines takes place. After this is done the bands march off to make way for the civil parade of athletes and civilians. This continues until the people leave the square to which the party leadership then leaves the grandstand to go into the palace.

=== Cultural events ===
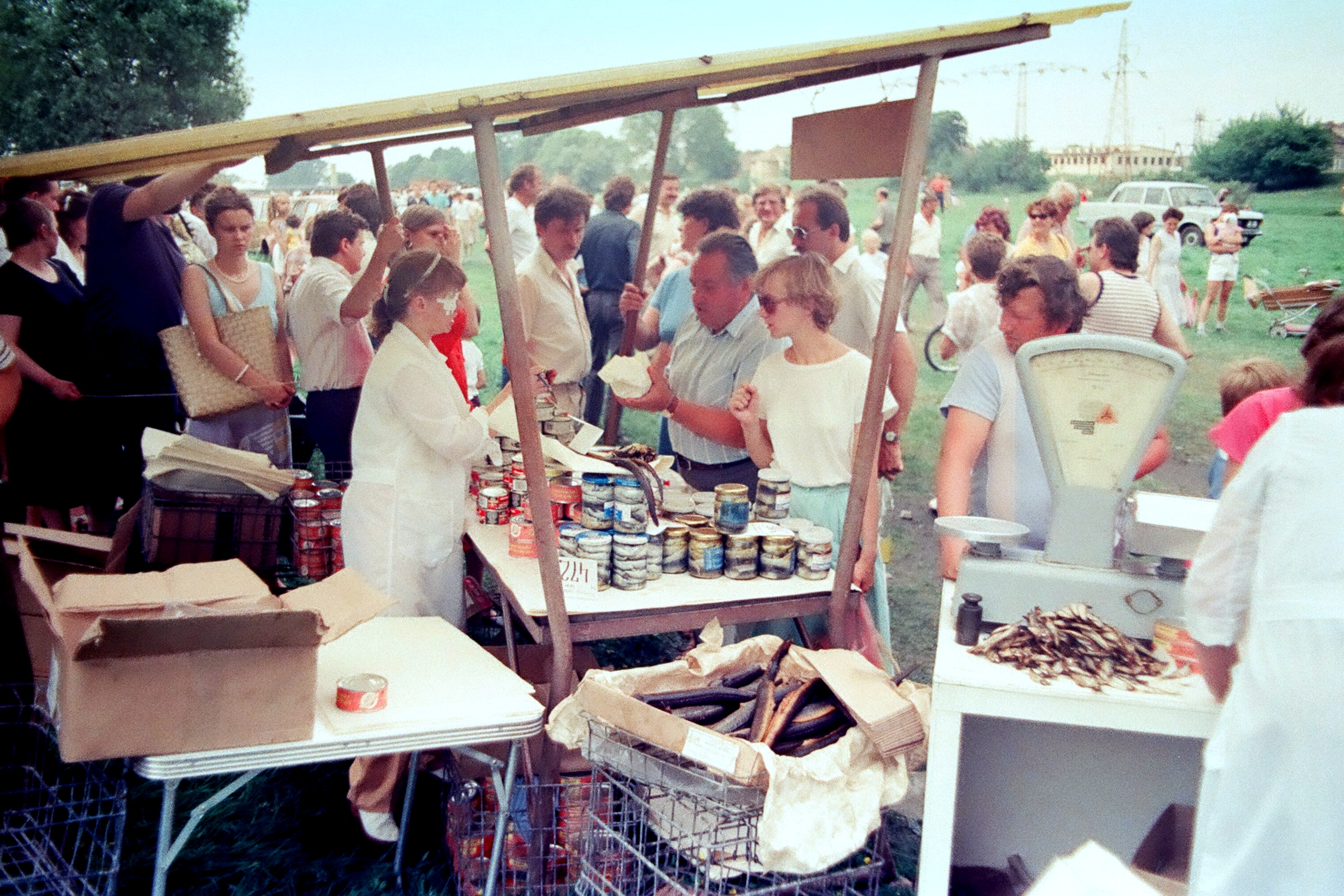
Local festivities in 1984.

Many youth and cultural events take place, including events in-line with traditional Polish customs. The Polish Socialist Youth Union and the preceding Union of Polish Youth often spearheaded any youth events throughout the country. The National Summer School and Student Youth Games were opened at the 10th-Anniversary Stadium. A solemn concert of choirs and orchestras and the Polish National Ballet are held at the Teatr Wielki (Grand Theater) in the evening.

The government has completed and opened cultural buildings/structures in time for the holiday, such as the following:

- Poniatowski Bridge (1946)
- Warsaw W-Z Route (1949)
- Marszałkowska Housing District (1950)
- 10th-Anniversary Stadium (1955)
- Palace of Culture and Science (1955)
- Łazienkowski Bridge (1974)

In 1984, a military tattoo took place in the 10th-Anniversary Stadium on the eve of the holiday featuring the Band of the Polish Air Force, the Band of the Navy of Poland, the Band of the Polish Border Guard, many of the 16 regional garrison bands performing all in front of First Secretary Wojciech Jaruzelski.

== See also ==
- Republic Day (East Germany)
- October Revolution Day
- Liberation Day (Hungary)
- Victory Day (9 May)
