= Nemzeti dal =

Hungarian poem by Sándor Petőfi

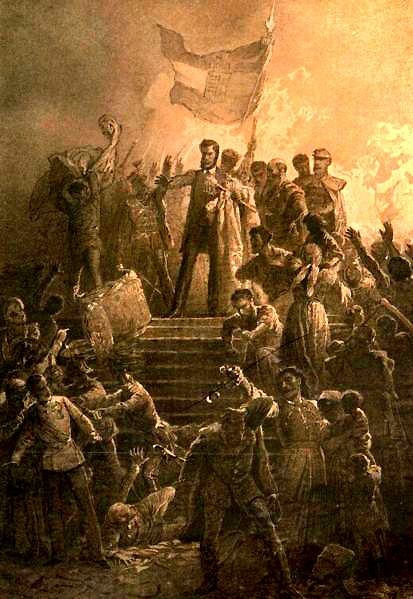
Sándor Petőfi reading the Nemzeti dal

The Nemzeti dal ("National Song") is a Hungarian patriotic poem written by Sándor Petőfi that is said to have inspired the Hungarian Revolution of 1848. Petőfi read the poem aloud on 15 March on the steps of the Hungarian National Museum in Budapest to a gathering crowd, who by the end were chanting the refrain as they began to march around the city, seizing the presses, liberating political prisoners, and declaring the end of Austrian rule.

Hungarians celebrate the anniversary of the revolution on 15 March. Red-white-green ribbons are worn to commemorate the fallen revolutionaries and the ideal of the revolution. Hungary briefly achieved independence from 1848–1849, but was defeated by the combined forces of the Habsburgs and the Russian Empire. Despite its ultimate defeat, the revolution initiated a chain of events that led to the autonomy of Hungary within the new Austro-Hungarian Empire in 1867.

The poem has come to rank third after the Himnusz and Szózat as a statement of Hungarian national identity.

The translation below of the "National Poem" is literal, attempting to convey the precise meaning of the original text.

Nemzeti dal

Talpra magyar, hí a haza!
Itt az idő, most vagy soha!
Rabok legyünk vagy szabadok?
Ez a kérdés, válasszatok! –
A magyarok istenére
Esküszünk,
Esküszünk, hogy rabok tovább
Nem leszünk!

Rabok voltunk mostanáig,
Kárhozottak ősapáink,
Kik szabadon éltek-haltak,
Szolgaföldben nem nyughatnak.
A magyarok istenére
Esküszünk,
Esküszünk, hogy rabok tovább
Nem leszünk!

Sehonnai bitang ember,
Ki most, ha kell, halni nem mer,
Kinek drágább rongy élete,
Mint a haza becsülete.
A magyarok istenére
Esküszünk,
Esküszünk, hogy rabok tovább
Nem leszünk!

Fényesebb a láncnál a kard,
Jobban ékesíti a kart,
És mi mégis láncot hordtunk!
Ide veled, régi kardunk!
A magyarok istenére
Esküszünk,
Esküszünk, hogy rabok tovább
Nem leszünk!

A magyar név megint szép lesz,
Méltó régi nagy hiréhez;
Mit rákentek a századok,
Lemossuk a gyalázatot!
A magyarok istenére
Esküszünk,
Esküszünk, hogy rabok tovább
Nem leszünk!

Hol sírjaink domborulnak,
Unokáink leborulnak,
És áldó imádság mellett
Mondják el szent neveinket.
A magyarok istenére
Esküszünk,
Esküszünk, hogy rabok tovább
Nem leszünk!

—PETŐFI SÁNDOR (1848)

The National Poem

On your feet, Magyar, the homeland calls!
The time is here, now or never!
Shall we be slaves or free?
This is the question, choose your answer! -
By the God of the Hungarians
We vow,
We vow, that we won't be slaves
any longer!

We were slaves up til now,
Damned are our ancestors,
Who lived and died free,
Cannot rest in a slave land.
By the God of the Hungarians
We vow,
We vow, that we won't be slaves
any longer!

Useless villain of a man,
Who now, if need be, doesn't dare to die,
Who values his pathetic life greater
Than the honor of his homeland.
By the God of the Hungarians
We vow,
We vow, that we won't be slaves
any longer!

The sword shines brighter than the chain,
Decorates better the arm,
And we still wore chains!
Return now, our old sword!
By the God of the Hungarians
We vow,
We vow, that we won't be slaves
any longer!

The Magyar name will be great again,
Worthy of its old, great honor;
Which the centuries smeared on it,
We will wash away the shame!
By the God of the Hungarians
We vow,
We vow, that we won't be slaves
any longer!

Where our grave mounds lie,
Our grandchildren will kneel,
And with blessing prayer,
Recite our sainted names.
By the God of the Hungarians
We vow,
We vow, that we won't be slaves
any longer!

—Translated by KŐRÖSSY LÁSZLÓ (2004)
