= Representative Central Band of the Polish Armed Forces =

Representative Band of the Polish Armed Forces
- Orkiestra Reprezentacyjna Wojska Polskiego
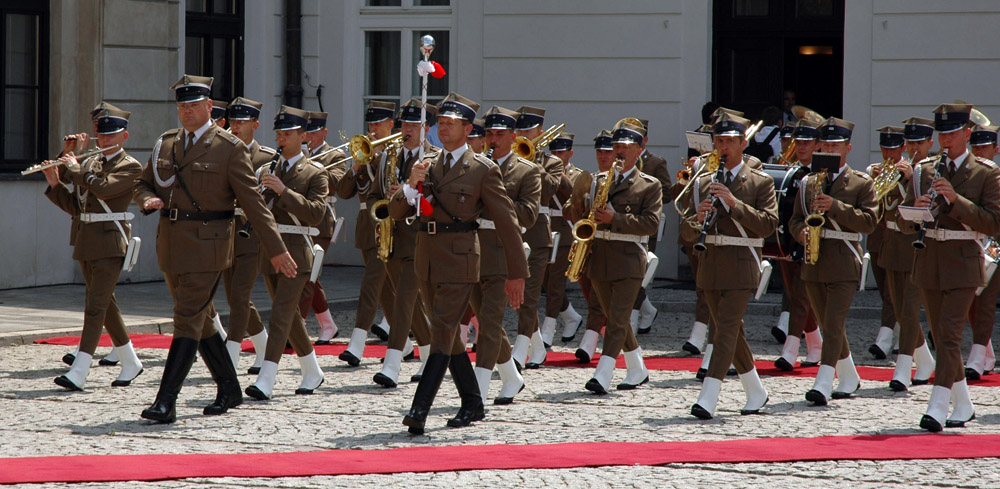
- The band at the forecourt of the Presidential Palace.
- Active: 1918 - present
- Country: Poland
- Branch: Polish Armed Forces
- Type: Military Band
- Part of: 1st Guards Battalion, Representative Honor Guard Regiment
- Garrison/HQ: Franciszka Hynka Street, Warsaw
- Patron: Józef Wybicki

Commanders
- Director of Music: Major Miroslaw Rytel
- Bandmaster: Captain Marcin Ślązak

The Representative Band of the Polish Armed Forces (Note: or Polish Armed Forces' Representative Band) (Polish: Orkiestra Reprezentacyjna Wojska Polskiego) is a military music unit that provides musical accompaniment for official state ceremonies in the Republic of Poland. The musicians of the band are required to play ceremonial music for visiting heads of state as well as perform during national events. Since the establishment of the Third Republic in 1989, the band has become chief among its other counterparts, including the Warsaw Capital Garrison Band and the Representative Band of the Polish Land Forces. It is currently attached to the 1st Guards Battalion, Representative Honor Guard Regiment (the honor guard unit of the armed forces).

== History ==
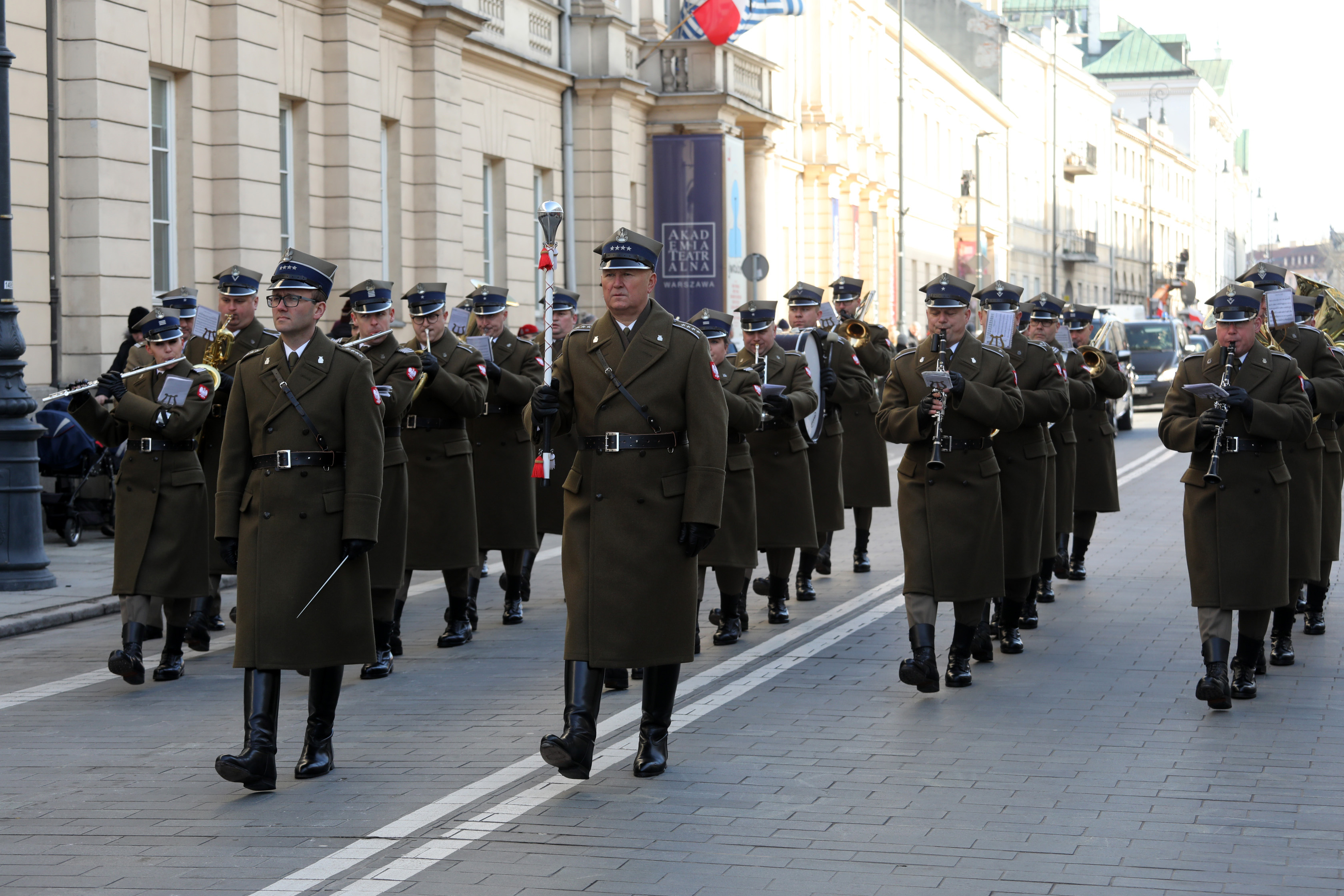
Members of the band during the funeral ceremonies of former Prime Minister of Poland Jan Olszewski in February 2019.

The history of the Representative Band of the Polish Army goes back to the time of the Polish Legions in 1918. The band was founded in 1963 as part of the Polish People's Army. On 19 August of that same year, it was given the honorary name Central Band of the Polish Armed Forces "Józef Wybicki", in honor of the author of the Polish national anthem (Poland Is Not Yet Lost). In 1984, it obtained its current status as the "Representative Band" of the armed forces, and in 1993, in accordance with the order from Minister of National Defense Janusz Onyszkiewicz, it was officially renamed from the Band of the LWP to the band of the newly reformed Polish Armed Forces. It was enlarged in the spring of 2018 to 120 members, making it one of the largest in Europe.

== Events ==
=== Regimental events ===
On 31 March 2018, the band performed during the battalion's official renaming ceremony, following an Armed Forces-wide reorganization of ceremonial units. Exactly a year later, a ceremony of the Presentation of Colours took place at the Tomb of the Unknown Soldier in Warsaw with President Andrzej Duda as the presiding officer.

=== Receptions ===
The band takes part in the ceremonial reception and state arrival ceremonies at the Presidential Palace for visiting presidents and the Chancellery for visiting prime ministers, rendering honors and performing the anthems of the two countries present. After the anthems are performed, the band plays Marsz Generalski during the guard inspection and Warszawianka during the marchpast. In between the performance of the two marches, the band performs a series of ceremonial pieces. During the marchpast, the band always leads the honor guard while the drum major and director salute.

=== Armed Forces Day ===
It provides musical accompaniment for the annual Armed Forces Day parade on Ujazdów Avenue.

=== Independence Day ===
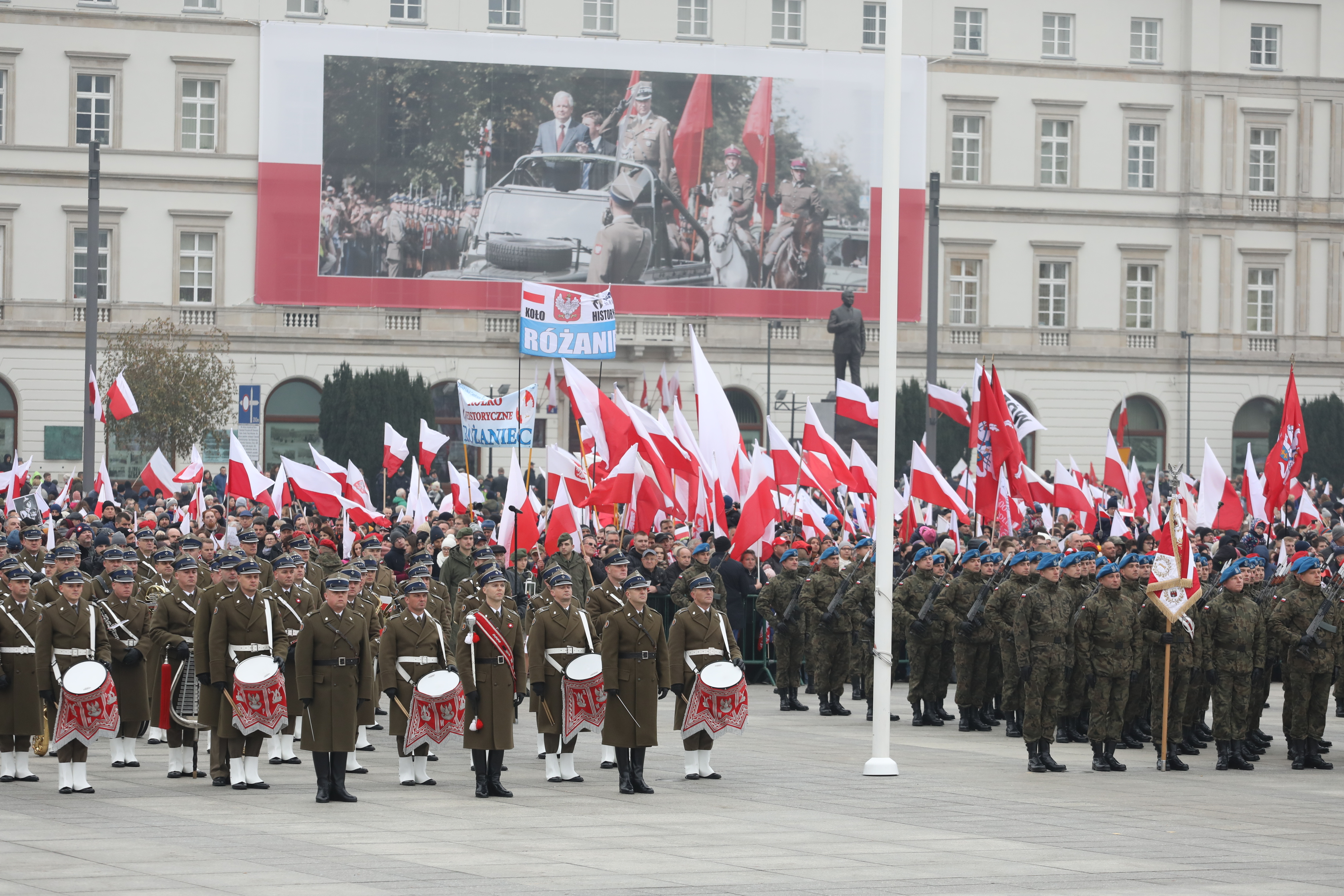
The band during the Independence Day parade in 2018.

It provides musical accompaniment for the annual National Independence Day ceremony on Piłsudski Square. A fanfare team from the band is present as soldiers unfurl the Flag of Poland before another fanfare is sounded and musicians of the band alongside singers of the Symphony Orchestra and Choir of the Armed Forces, perform the National Anthem. The Armed Forces Memorial Fanfare (Haslo Wojska Polskiego) is also sounded and after the wreath laying ceremony, Spij Kolego is played by a lone trumpeter of the band. Other musical pieces include We Are the First Brigade, which is the march of the Polish Land Forces.

=== Foreign events ===
It has participated in many international music festivals around the world, including festivals in Austria, Belgium, France, Georgia, Germany, the United States, Italy and Russia. In September 2000 they participated at the Norwegian Military Tattoo and in 2012, it took part in the Russian Armed Forces's Spasskaya Tower Military Music Festival and Tattoo in Moscow. In June 2014, the band participated in the celebration of the 70th anniversary of the D-Day landings on the beaches of Normandy in Caen, France. Every September, the band performs at the a parade of Polish-Americans in downtown Chicago at the invitation of the Polish Consulate General. In October 2014, members of the band performed at the Birmingham Tattoo in England.

== Uniform ==
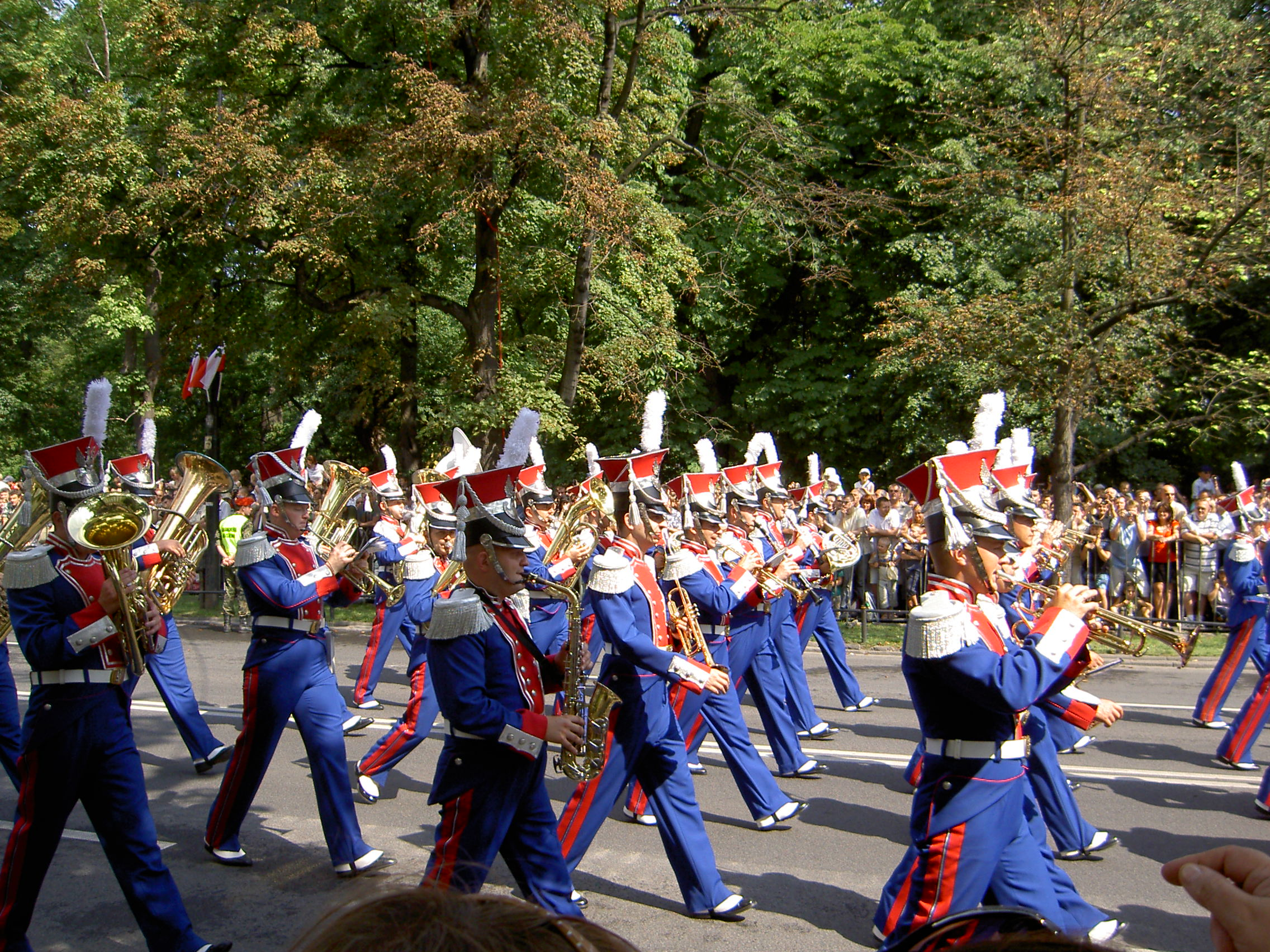
The band musicians dressed in historic uniforms.

The band usually performs in the uniform of the Representative Honor Guard Regiment, while on special holidays and military tattoo performances the musicians of the central band dress up in historical uniforms from the era of the Duchy of Warsaw.

== See also ==
- Representative Band of the Policja
- Presidential Horse Guard Mounted Ceremonial Squadron of the Polish Army
- Warsaw Garrison Command
