= National Independence Day (Poland) =

National holiday celebrated in Poland on 11 November

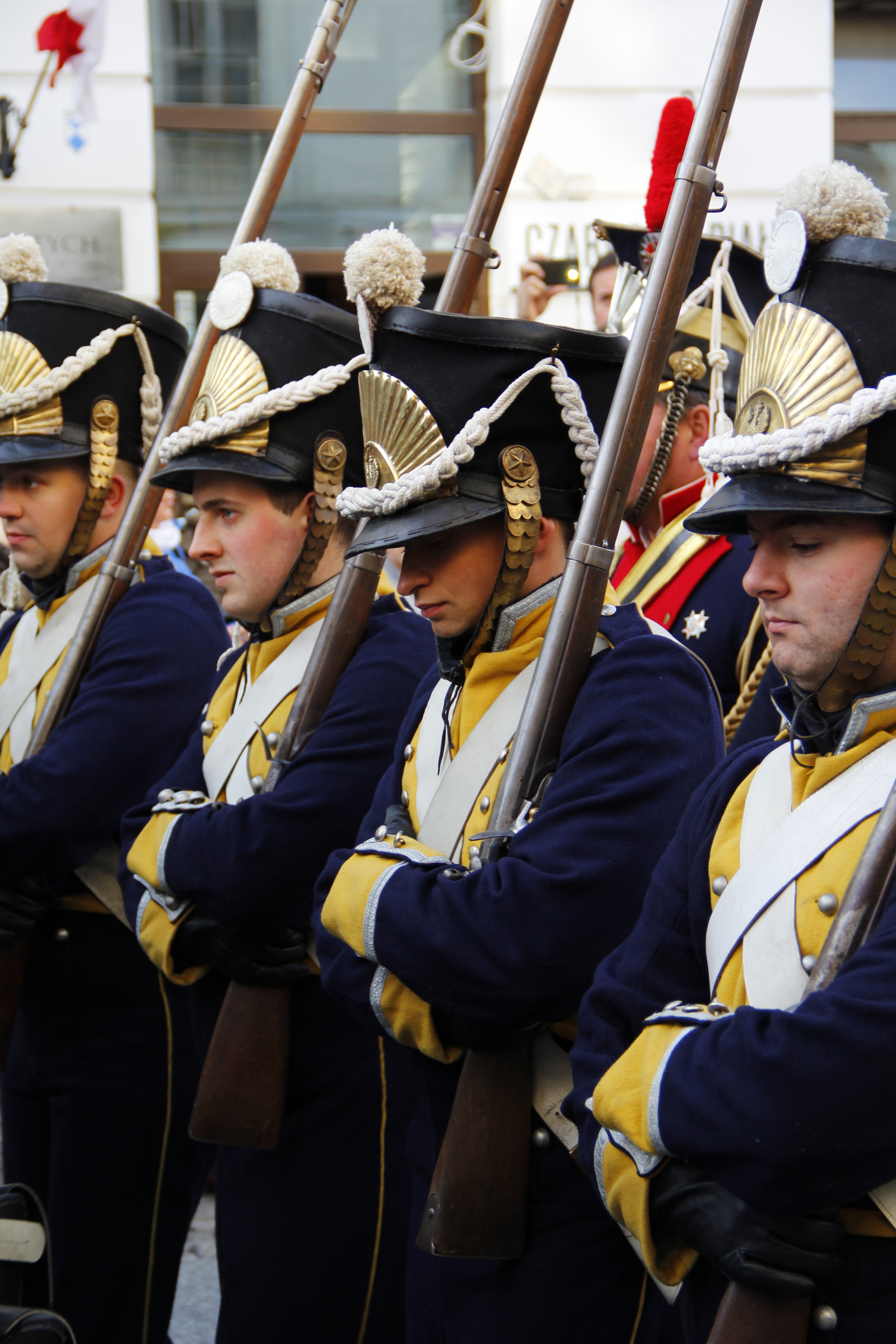
- Historical reconstruction of Polish soldiers, who fought for independence in the November Uprising (1830–1831), parading along Warsaw's Royal Route
- Observed by: Poland
- Significance: To commemorate the recovery of a sovereign state by the Poles in 1918
- Celebrations: family reunions, concerts, parades
- Date: 11 November
- Next time: 11 November 2026
- Frequency: Annual

The National Independence Day (Polish: Narodowe Święto Niepodległości) is a national day in Poland celebrated on 11 November to commemorate the anniversary of the restoration of Poland's sovereignty as the Second Polish Republic in 1918 from the German, Austro-Hungarian and Russian Empires. Following the partitions in the late 18th century, Poland ceased to exist as a sovereign and unified state for 123 years until the end of World War I, when the destruction of the neighbouring powers allowed the country to reemerge. It is a non-working day and a flag flying day in Poland.

== Historical background ==
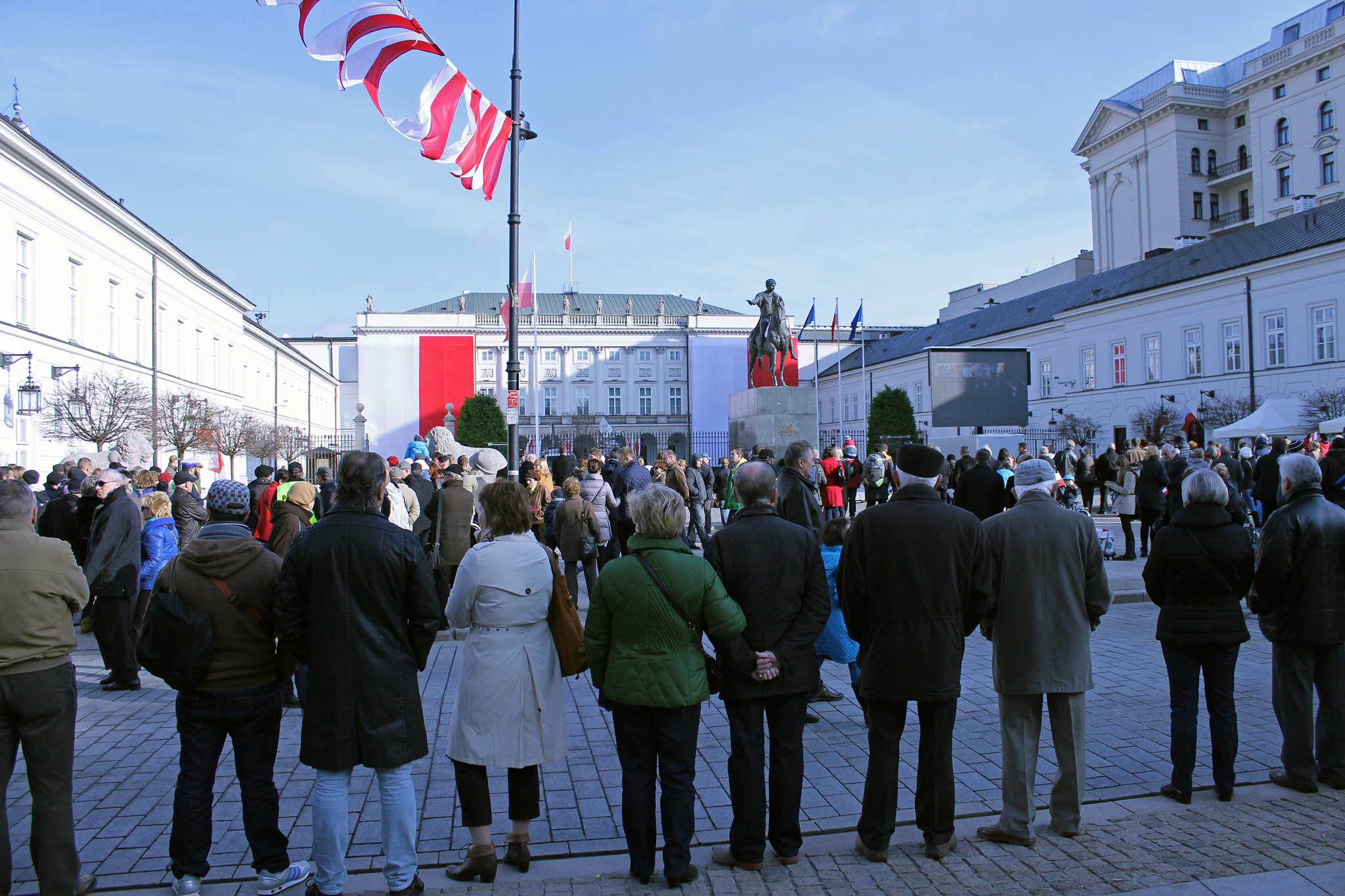
People gathered in front of the Presidential Palace in Warsaw to celebrate National Independence Day (2013)

The restoration of Poland's independence was gradual. On 5 November 1916 the Act of 5th November was released in order to create the Regency Kingdom of Poland. On 14 January 1917 the Provisional Council of State had started its activity. On 12 November 1917 the Regency Council took over the head of state duties. Following the defeat of the occupying forces, the Poles seized military and civil power, building the foundations of their future state. On 7 October 1918 the Regency Council announced Poland's independence. On 23 October 1918 the government with the prime minister Józef Świeżyński was established, without approval by the German authorities. On 28 October 1918 the Polish Liquidation Committee was formed in Kraków. The Committee seized power from the Austrians in Galicia and Cieszyn Silesia. A few days later they succeeded in disarming the Austrian forces using members of the secret Polish Military Organisation as well as legionnaires and young people. In 1 November the branches of the Polish Military Organization began disarming German and Austrian soldiers. On 6/7 November 1918 in Lublin, Ignacy Daszyński established the Provisional People's Government of the Republic of Poland. The government was made up of representatives from the Polish Socialist Party (PPS), the Polish Social Democratic Party (PPSD) and the Polish People's Party "Wyzwolenie" (Liberation). At the same time the Government troops disarmed the occupying forces around the city of Kielce and Lublin. It was at this point that the country's future head of state, Józef Piłsudski, returned to Poland after incarceration by the Germans.

Crucial to restoring independence was the defeat in the war of all three of the occupying powers. Russia was plunged into the confusion of revolution and civil war, Austria-Hungary disintegrated and went into decline, and the German Empire bowed to pressure from the forces of the Entente. For Poles, this was a unique opportunity to reclaim their independence. On 10 November Józef Piłsudski came to Warsaw, previously released from prison in Magdeburg, where he was enthusiastically met by the population of the capital and saw the mass disarmament of the occupying forces across the whole of Poland. On 11th Piłsudski was appointed Commander-in-chief by the Regency Council and was entrusted with creating a national government for the restored Polish State, forming a new centralized government and soon calling parliamentary elections. On 16 November Józef Piłsudski signed a telegram notifying the creation of an independent Polish State. The telegram was sent by radio to the leaders of the superpowers and to all of the warring or neutral governments three days later with the use of equipment from the Warsaw Citadel, just after exiting the German troops. On 17 November, following the resignation of Ignacy Daszyński, Józef Piłsudski appointed Jędrzej Moraczewski as the prime minister.

It was a day of military ceremony since 1920. On 8 November 1926, the Prime Minister of Poland, Józef Piłsudski, issued a circular establishing 11 November as a day off for state officials. A tradition became established that from then on he personally inspected the units of the Warsaw Garrison (last time in 1934), inspected the parade and awarded orders and medals. The holiday was constituted in 1937 and was celebrated only twice before World War II. After the war, the communist authorities of the People's Republic removed Independence Day from the calendar, though reclamation of independence continued to be celebrated informally on 11 November. The holiday was officially replaced by the National Day of Poland's Revival as Poland's National Day, celebrated on 22 July anniversary of the communist PKWN Manifesto under Joseph Stalin. In particular, during the 1980s, in many cities, including Warsaw, informal marches and celebrations were held, with the outlawed Solidarity Movement supporters participating. Typically these marches were brutally dispersed by the communist militarized police forces, with many participants arrested by the security police. During this time 11 November Independence Day marches, alongside the Constitution Day on 3 May celebration gatherings, also banned by the communist authorities, were the customary dates of demonstrations by the opponents of the communist regime. As Poland emerged from communism in 1989, the original holiday—on its original 11 November date—was restored.

The date coincides with the celebration of the Armistice in other countries. All of these holidays and Polish Independence Day are indirectly related because they all emerged from the circumstances at the end of World War I. In other countries, holidays were established in the spirit of grief and horror at the enormous human cost of the war, and they mark the sacrifices of those who fought. For Poland, however, the tragedy of the war was tempered by what had been accomplished at its end: the restoration of a sovereign Polish state that had been lost entirely in the partitions of Poland, after 123 years of struggle. The Polish holiday is therefore simultaneously a celebration of the reemergence of a Polish state and a commemoration of those who fought for it.

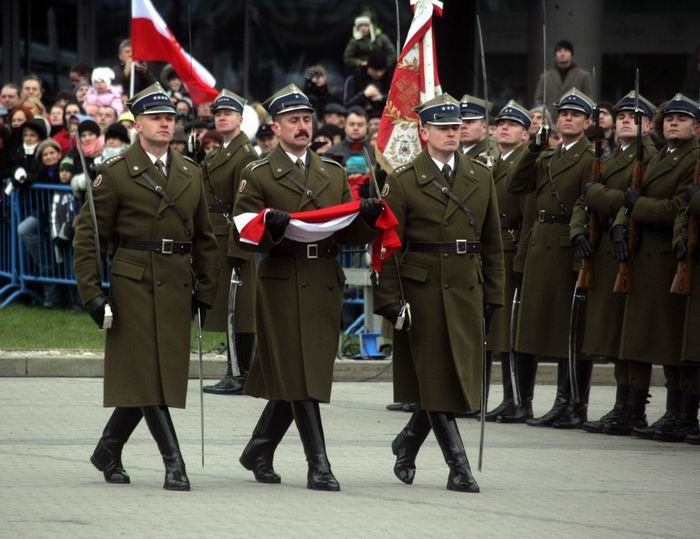
Military ceremony performed on Piłsudski Square, before the Tomb of the Unknown Soldier

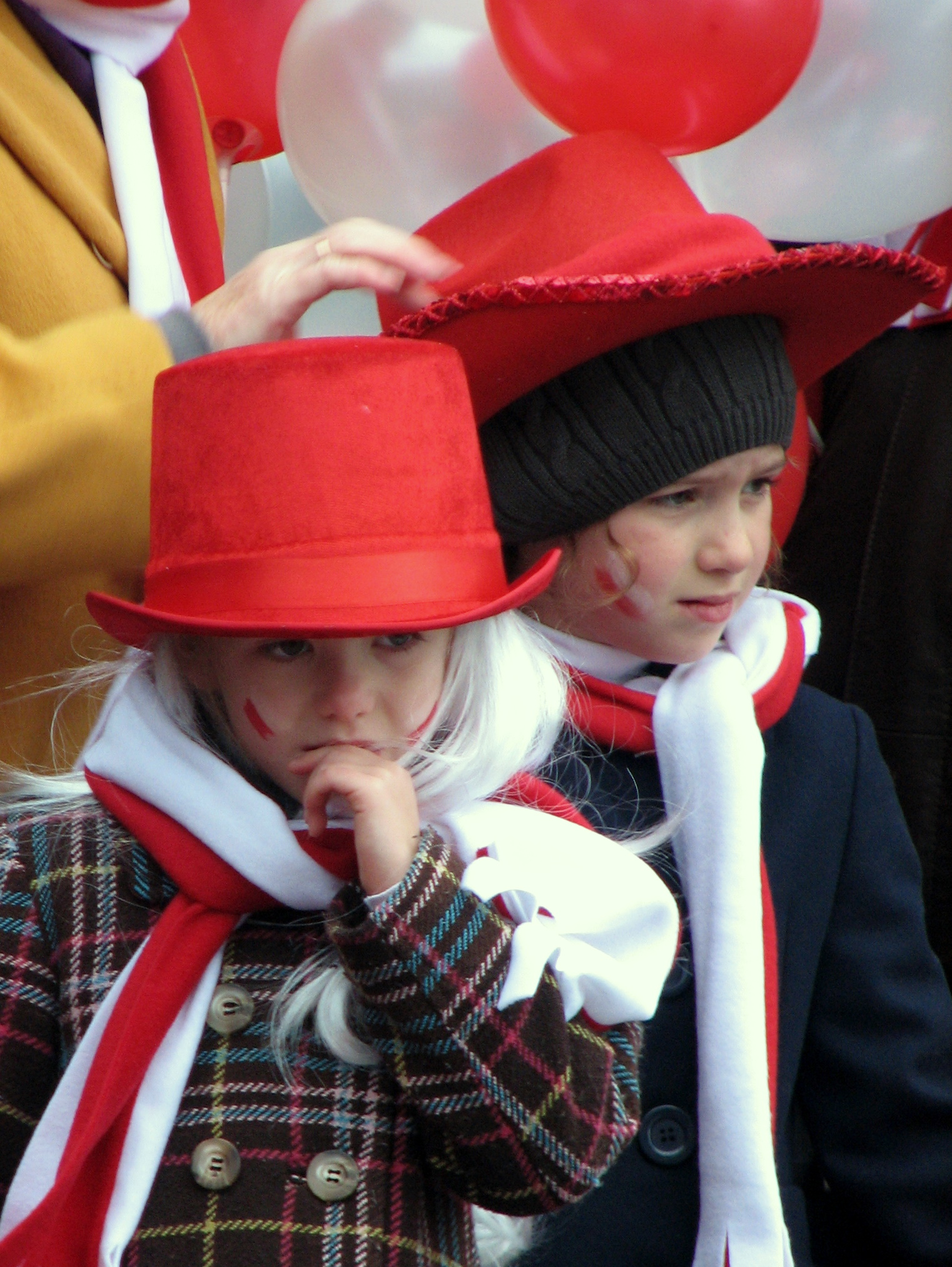
Children participating in the National Independence Day celebrations in Gdańsk, 2010

== National celebrations ==
Presided by the President of Poland in his capacity as Commander in Chief of the Polish Armed Forces, the televised celebrations at Warsaw's Piłsudski Square serve as the national celebratory event in honor of the anniversary of the restoration of Polish independence in 1918. The parade contingent is made up of a regiment-sized formations of two battalions, two composed of armed forces personnel and the other made up of personnel of the civil services and is led by a general or flag officer (at times a Colonel/Captain) of the Armed Forces, usually the commanding officer of the Representative Honor Guard Regiment of the Polish Armed Forces or as commanding general of the Warsaw Capital Garrison or armed forces formations stationed in the capital.

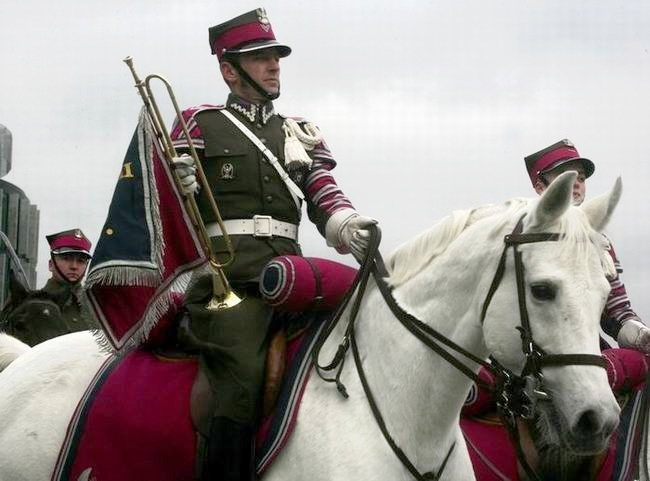
A fanfare trumpeter of the Presidential Horse Guard Mounted Ceremonial Squadron of the Polish Army at the 2007 National Independence Day ceremonies.

The parade formation is formed up into:

- 1st Battalion
  - 1 Honor Guard Company (Presidential Joint Service), 1st Guards Battalion, Representative Honor Guard Regiment of the Polish Armed Forces
  - Honor Guard Company, Polish Land Forces
  - Honor Guard Squadron, Polish Air Force
  - Honor Guard Company, Polish Navy
  - Honor Guard Company, Polish Special Forces
  - Warsaw Capital Garrison Command Honor Guard Company
  - Honor Guard Company, Polish Territorial Defence Forces
  - Honor Guard Company of the Armed Forces Support Inspectorate
  - Honor Guard Company of the Military Gendarmerie of the Armed Forces
- Representative Central Band of the Polish Armed Forces
- 2nd Battalion
  - Honor Guard Company of the Border Guard Service
  - Honor Guard Company of the Polish Police
  - Honor Guard Company of the State Fire Service
  - Honor Guard Company of the Customs Service of the National Revenue Administration
  - Honor Guard Company of the Prisons Service
  - Honor Guard Company of the Marshal's Guard of the Sejm

These formations, except for the 1 Honor Guard Company (Presidential Joint Service), have extra two personnel for the guard mounting segment in front of the Tomb of the Unknown Soldier, which is during the ceremony proper. Behind the formations is the RHGR's State Honors Artillery Battery, whose 4-5 vintage First World War field guns are stationed.

The ceremony begins at 10am, before that the Minister of National Defense and the Prime Minister each inspect the formations assembled. As the troopers of the Presidential Horse Guard Mounted Ceremonial Squadron of the Polish Armed Forces take their places at the west end, the President arrives as the musicians of the RCB-PAF sound a fanfare and then the Marsz Generalski is played as following the disembarking from the vehicle, he/she then inspects the troopers, following which the Chief of the General Staff walks to him/her following the first inspection to inform him of the commencement of the parade and ceremony event:

Mr/Mrs President, sir/ma'am, the Chief of the General Staff (states rank and name) informs you that the ceremonial guard mounting and parade of the Warsaw Capital Garrison in honor of the (states numbering) anniversary of the restoration of national independence of the Republic of Poland has been formed up and is now ready for your inspection, sir/ma'am.

The report received, the President then inspects the two battalions of the parade joint regiment, which had just presented arms at the order of the parade commander. He/she stops to render honors to the ceremonial colours of each of the units that compose the parade. After all have been inspected, the President then stops at the center of the square nearest the presidential grandstand to greet the formations:

President: Greetings, servicemen and women!
Parade formation: Good morning, Mr/Mrs President, sir/ma'am!

Following this both the President and the Chief of the General Staff proceed to the south end facing the Tomb of the Unknown Soldier to render honors to the Unknown Soldier of the Polish War of Independence buried there in 1925. Another contingent of battalion size is present, representing military veterans, reservists and the Polish Scouting and Guiding Association. Following this, the Presidential Fanfare is sounded as the presidential jack is raised to indicate the presence of the President as Commander in Chief of the Polish Armed Forces. Both then proceed to the grandstand to receive the other dignitaries present, including the following:

- Prime Minister of Poland
- Marshals of Parliament (Sejm and the Senate), deputies and senators
- Service commanders and general and flag officers under the Ministry of National Defense and the Armed Forces General Headquarters
- Ministers and deputy ministers
- Commanders of the public uniformed security organizations
- The diplomatic corps, religious representatives and if present representatives from NATO armed forces
- Veterans of the armed forces the public uniformed security organizations and relatives and family members of fallen service personnel
- If present, representatives from state firms and the private sector

=== Ceremony ===
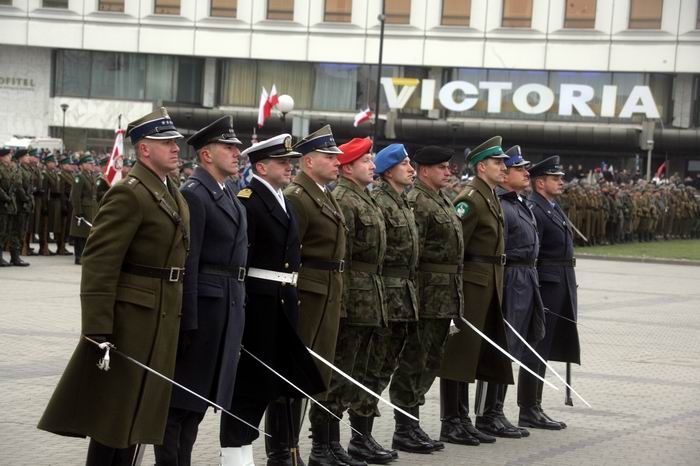
The company commanders of each unit at the center of the square.

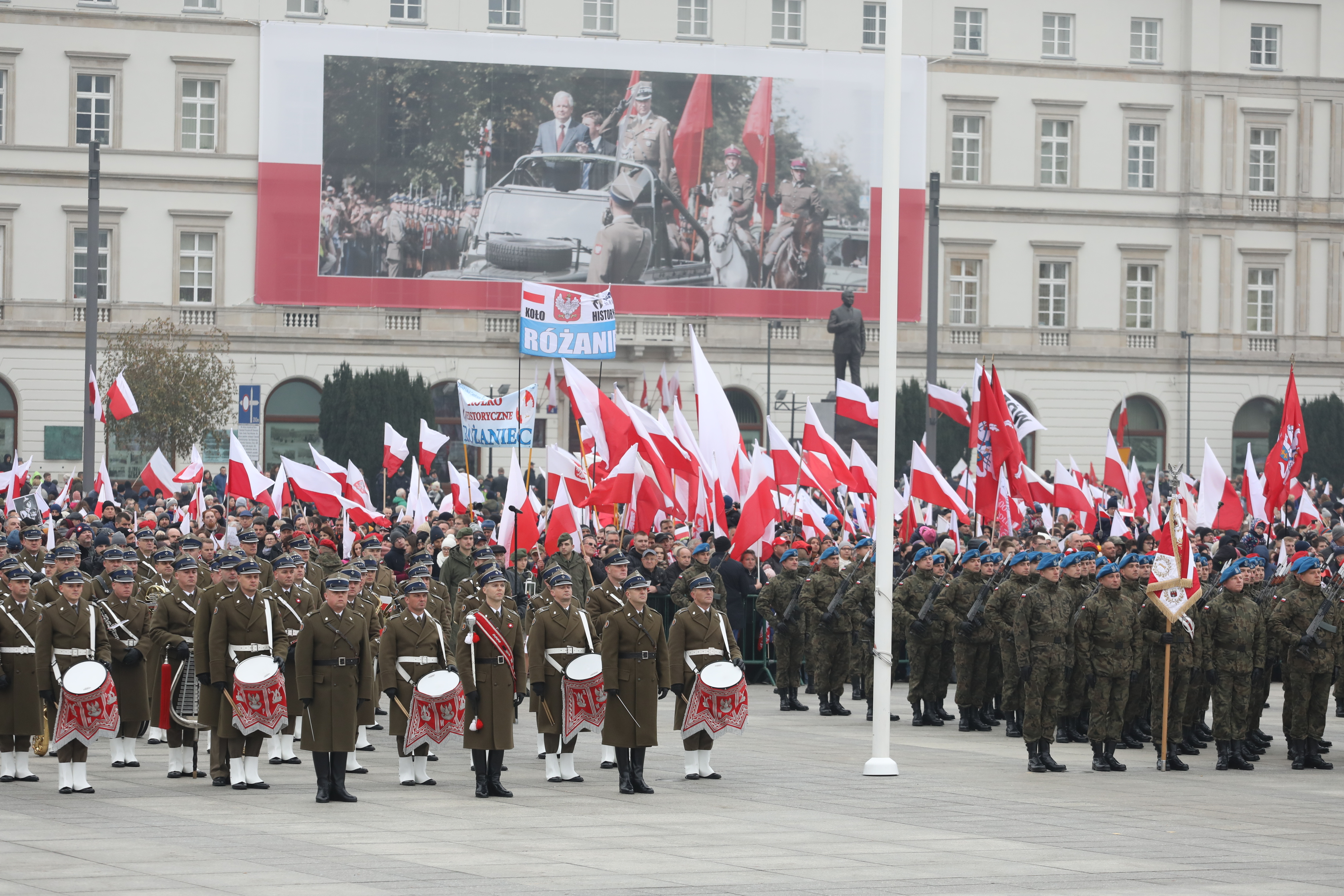
The parade in 2018.

The parade commander then shouts "For the raising of the national flag, colour guard, take post!" to commence the flag raising ceremony segment, in which three servicemen from 1 Honor Guard Company (Presidential Joint Service), 1st Guards Battalion, RHGR-PAF, then march off from their positions to take their place at the square's central flagpole. As they stop and the Flag of Poland is unfurled another fanfare is sounded and following the command "In honor of the anniversary of the restoration of the independence of the Republic of Poland, colour guard, raise the national flag!" the RCB-PAF's musicians, together with the singers of the Symphony Orchestra and Choir of the Armed Forces, perform the national anthem "Poland Is Not Yet Lost".

Following this, a serviceman from the Warsaw Garrison Command reads in public the Act of National Remembrance of and to the Fallen (Apel Pamięci), in which the parade remembers the millions of Polish war and civilian dead in the wars and conflicts fought by the Polish nation and people over the years. When the reading is completed a 21-gun salute is fired as 3 Scouts and Guides escort a ceremonial candle from the square to the Tomb of the Unknown Soldier as the tribute of the nation's young men and women to the memory of the millions who perished for country and people. The Armed Forces Memorial Fanfare (Haslo Wojska Polskiego) is then sounded.

=== Guard mounting at the Tomb ===
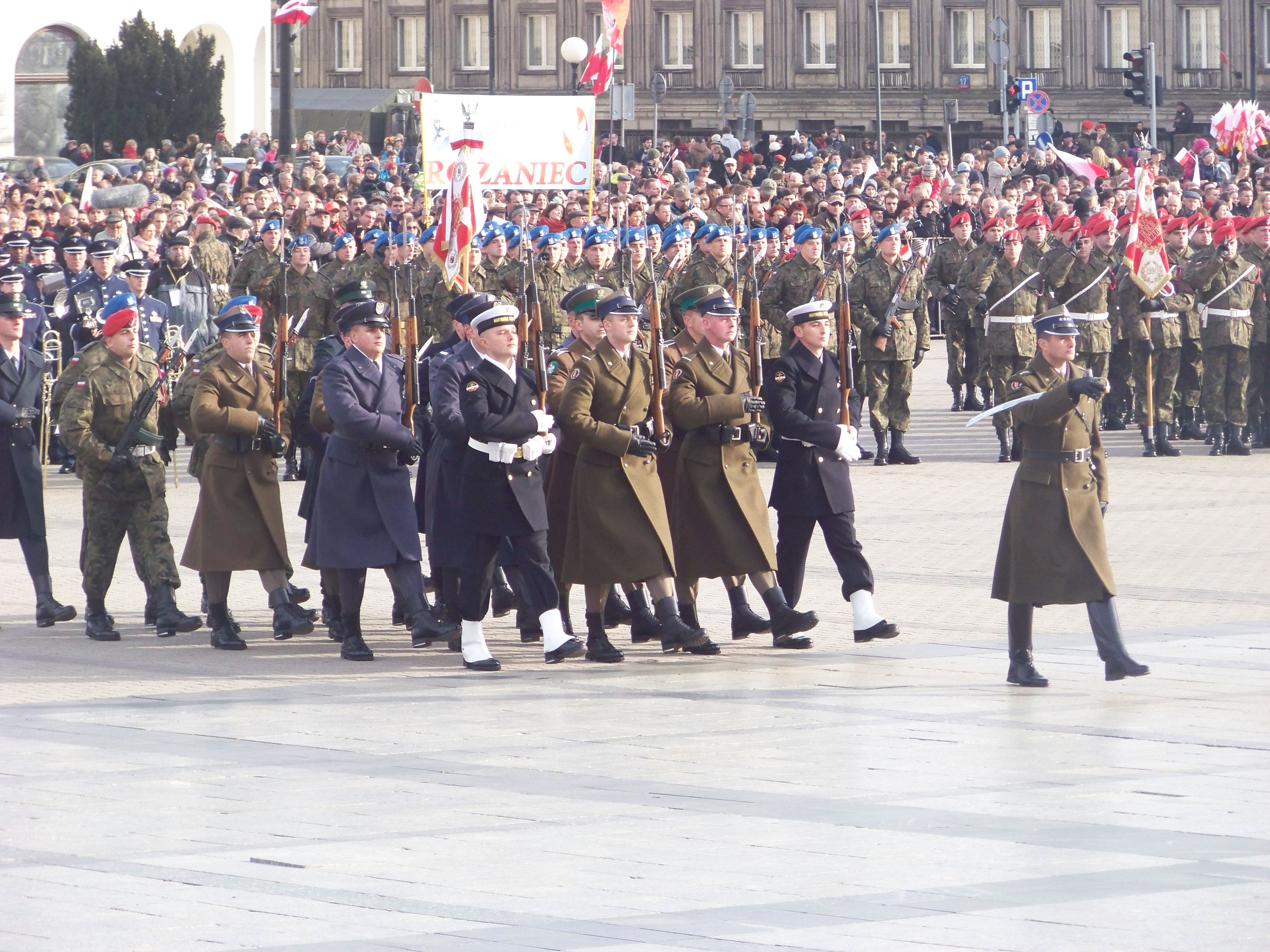
A joint honor guard preparing for the mounting of the guard at the Tomb.

The act of remembrance finished the parade commander then prepares the companies for the solemn guard mounting at the Tomb of the Unknown Soldier. Each of the company commanders, save that of 1 Honor Guard Company (Presidential Joint Service), after having taken their posts at the center of the square and with the parade now at the order arms position and then ordered at ease, then inform him of the readiness of their companies for the guard mount:

Colonel/Brigadier General sir, the guard of honor company is ready for the ceremony of the mounting of the guard. Company commander of the (states honor guard company and service branch), (states rank and name)

After all the company commanders have returned to their posts, the parade renders honors again as a fanfare call is sounded and then the parade commander orders the parade to begin the mounting of the guard sentry platoon. The guard commander is an officer of the Warsaw Garrison Command, with the platoon made up of the extra two personnel assigned to each of the units forming the parade. To music of the band the sentry platoon takes its position at the center of the square and then march on to the tomb for the guard mount, wherein as the sentry platoon, the New Guard, takes its place of honor, the old guard section of just two soldiers from the WGC march off back to the parade formation with the guard officer.

=== Wreath laying ===
Following the presidential address that follows the guard mounting ceremony, wreaths are laid in the Tomb of the Unknown Soldier in honor of the millions of men and women who perished for country and people through the centuries of Polish existence. The President, Prime Minister and Minister of National Defense are the first to offer their remembrances there, followed by other high ranking civil, military and public security officials and representatives of the public and private sectors and veterans' organizations. Spij Kolego is played by a trumpeter of the band once all the wreaths have been laid.

=== March off and march past ===
Following the wreath laying, the band plays the armed forces march "We Are the First Brigade". After this, the parade commander orders the beginning of the march past of all the units present:

The parade will now march off in quick time, by your companies, parade, stand at.... ease!

Following this the commander of 1 Honour Guard Company (Presidential Joint Service) orders his company at attention for the march off, followed by the commanding officers of each of the other companies that form the parade battalions. All companies slope arms, execute a right turn and then begin the march off as the band starts playing. Outside the square, if any, are a number of living history and historical reenactment formations that prepare to march past after all the contingents on the square have marched off the grounds, wearing uniforms from various eras of Polish history. The band plays a neutral march first as the parade forms up for the march past by companies and then Warszawianka is played at the signal of the band drum major, marking the signal for the march past to begin. All the parade companies salute at the eyes right with all colours dipped and officers saluting their sabres.

== Annual Independence March ==
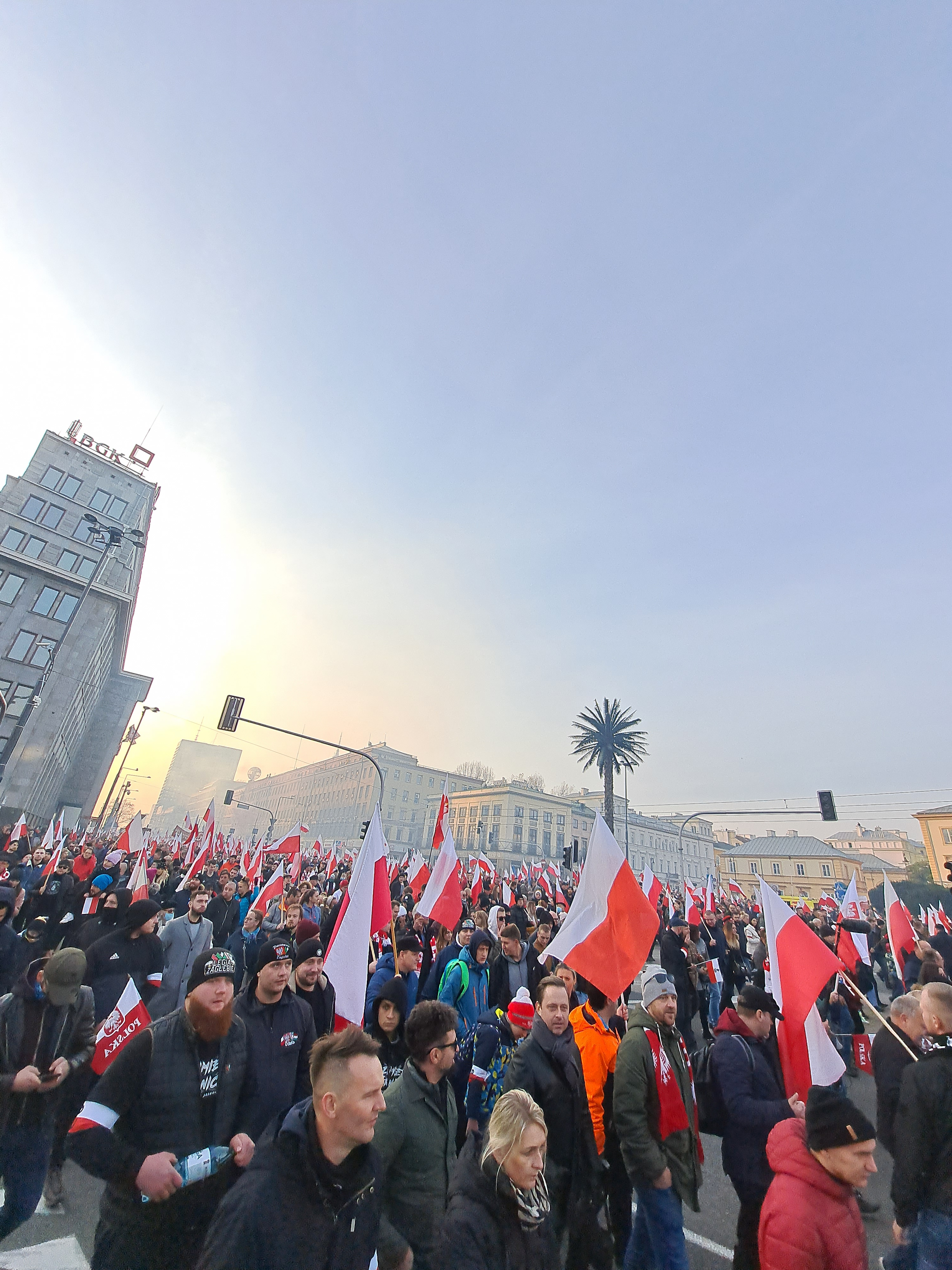
The Independence March, 2021

It is an annual demonstration in the form of a march through the streets of Warsaw on 11 November. The Independence March was initiated by nationalist political organizations: All-Polish Youth and ONR. Since 2011 the organizer of the march is the Independence March Association, which includes activists of these organizations.

According to the organizers' declaration, the Independence March is an element of the celebration of the National Independence Day and a demonstration of attachment to Polish tradition and patriotism. In 2017, the Rzeczpospolita daily wrote the march "was presented irresponsibly in many foreign and domestic media" and some newspaper journalists, including a Washington Post reporter, provided fake news on the event. Numerous journalists, activists and political observers have pointed out that the march promotes fascism, antisemitism and racism.

Every year, the Independence March gathers tens of thousands of people.

In 2021, the march was held under the slogan "Independence is not for sale". According to the organizers' estimates, about 150,000 people took part in the march. As noted in government circles, there were no serious incidents during the march, and the state services assessed the whole event as calm.

== See also ==
- Armed Forces Day (Poland)
- National Day of the Rebirth of Poland—former national day during the Polish People's Republic era, which both replaced and was replaced by National Independence Day.

== Historical bibliography ==
- Henryk Zieliński (1984). "The collapse of occupiers authority on Polish territories and the first attempts to create the Polish authority centers (X–XI 1918)". History of Poland 1918–1939 (in Polish). Warsaw: Polish Scientific Publishers PWN. ISBN 83-01-03866-7.
