= Representative Band of the Policja =

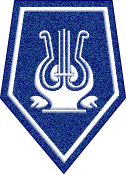
The Collar stripe of the Polish Police Band uniform (since 1995).

The Representative Band of the Policja (Polish: Orkiestra Reprezentacyjna Policji) is a musical unit of the Policja of the Republic of Poland. It is responsible for providing musical support and rendering honors to the President of Poland and the Minister of the Interior and Administration in the capital of Warsaw. It has been under the baton of Chief Conductor Janusz Trzepizur (since 2005) and Drum Major, Staff Sergeant Jakub Pietrucha. Being that it is a central band, it is the seniormost of three Polish police bands, with the other two being based in Wrocław and Katowice.

== History ==
The representative band was founded in 1968 as part of the Milicja Obywatelska of the Polish People's Republic. Its core consisted of a small group of interior ministry musicians, which gradually expanded. In 1984, 1986 and 1988, the band won the Cup of the Minister of Internal Affairs, which was as the time, and still is, the most prestigious trophy the band owns. Until May 2014, the band, whose main tasks includes performing at ceremonial settings, fell under the command of the Warsaw Metropolitan Police Headquarters and operated under the name Warsaw Police Band. On June 1, 2014, the band became a unit of the Presidential Division of the Police Headquarters of the Policja, and was renamed to the Representative Band of the Policja. On the band's 40th anniversary on 22 January 2009, a large concert was held at the Bajka theatre in Warsaw, with a program that featured inter alia, a solo performance of the Włodzimierz Korcz theme from the series 07 zgłoś się.

== Events ==
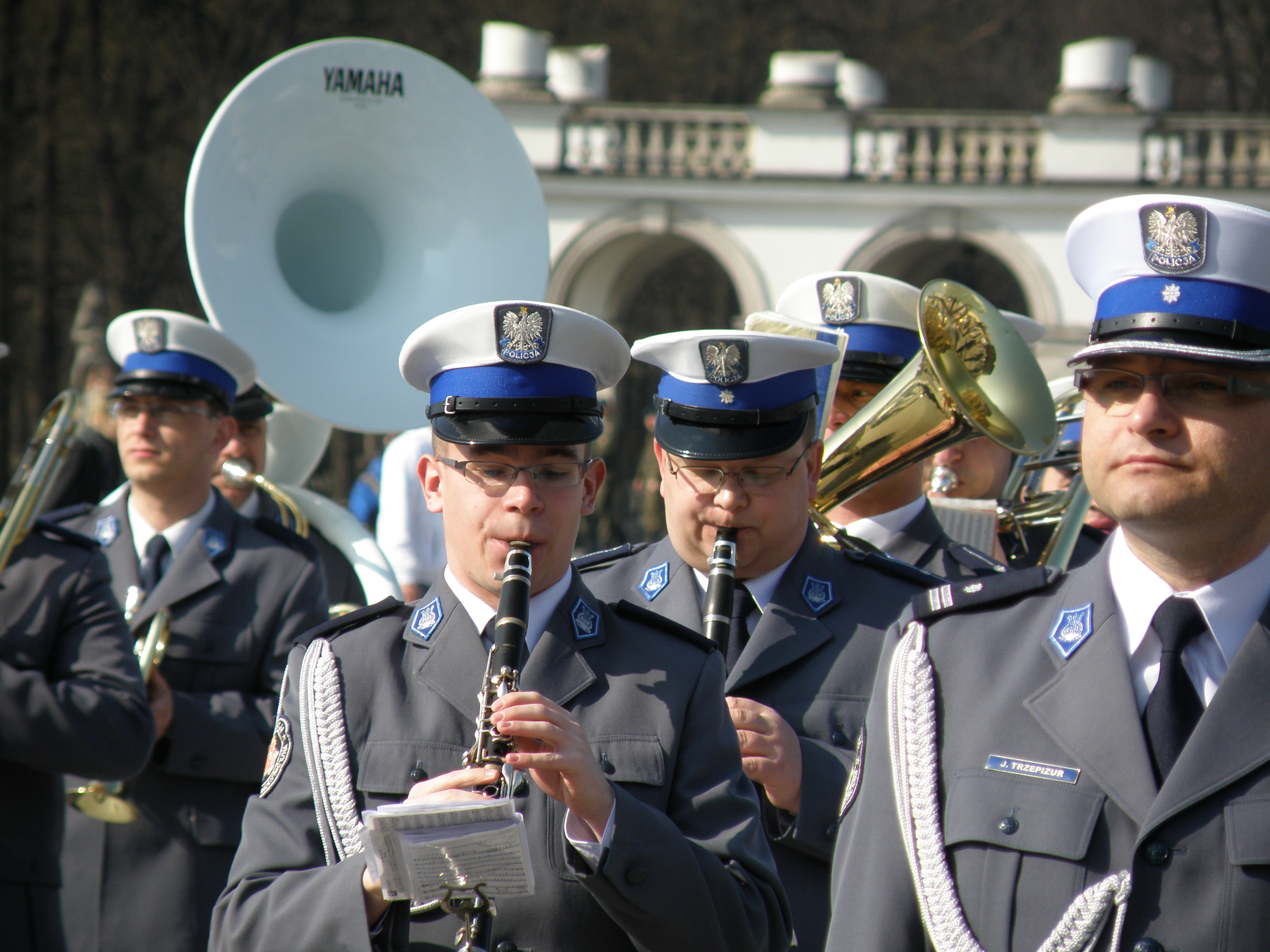
A group of musicians from the official Representative Band of the Policja.

Musicians from the band perform at various national and agency events, sometimes in a joint service setting with other uniformed bands such as the Representative Band of the Polish Border Guard and the Representative Central Band of the Polish Armed Forces. Being the official band of the Policja as well as the municipal City Guard, the group's musicians are often invited to play marching music for ceremonies on national holidays such as the following:

- Flag Day
- 3rd May Constitution Day
- Victory in Europe Day
- Police Day (Święto Policji)
- National Warsaw Uprising Remembrance Day
- Municipal Police Day
- National Independence Day

It also supports the Polish Police college in the town of Szczytno. The band has had the opportunity to present its artistic skills during prestigious festivals and military tattoos in Belarus, Belgium, the Czech Republic, Denmark, Germany, Russia and many other neighboring countries. Its musicians annually take part in the International Congress of Music in Kraków and donate all the proceeds of their performances to a number of charities for the sick and disadvantaged. In 2017, the band took part in the Birmingham International Tattoo in England.

== See also ==
- Law enforcement in Poland
- Band of the Castle Guards and the Police of the Czech Republic
- Central Band of the Armed Forces of the Republic of Belarus
- Police Band Service of the Ministry of Internal Affairs of Russia
- Band of the Department of Carabinier Troops
- Police band (music)
