= Representative Regiment of the Polish Armed Forces =

Representative Regiment of the Polish Armed Forces Honour Guard of the Polish Armed Forces
- Pułk Reprezentacyjny Wojska Polskiego
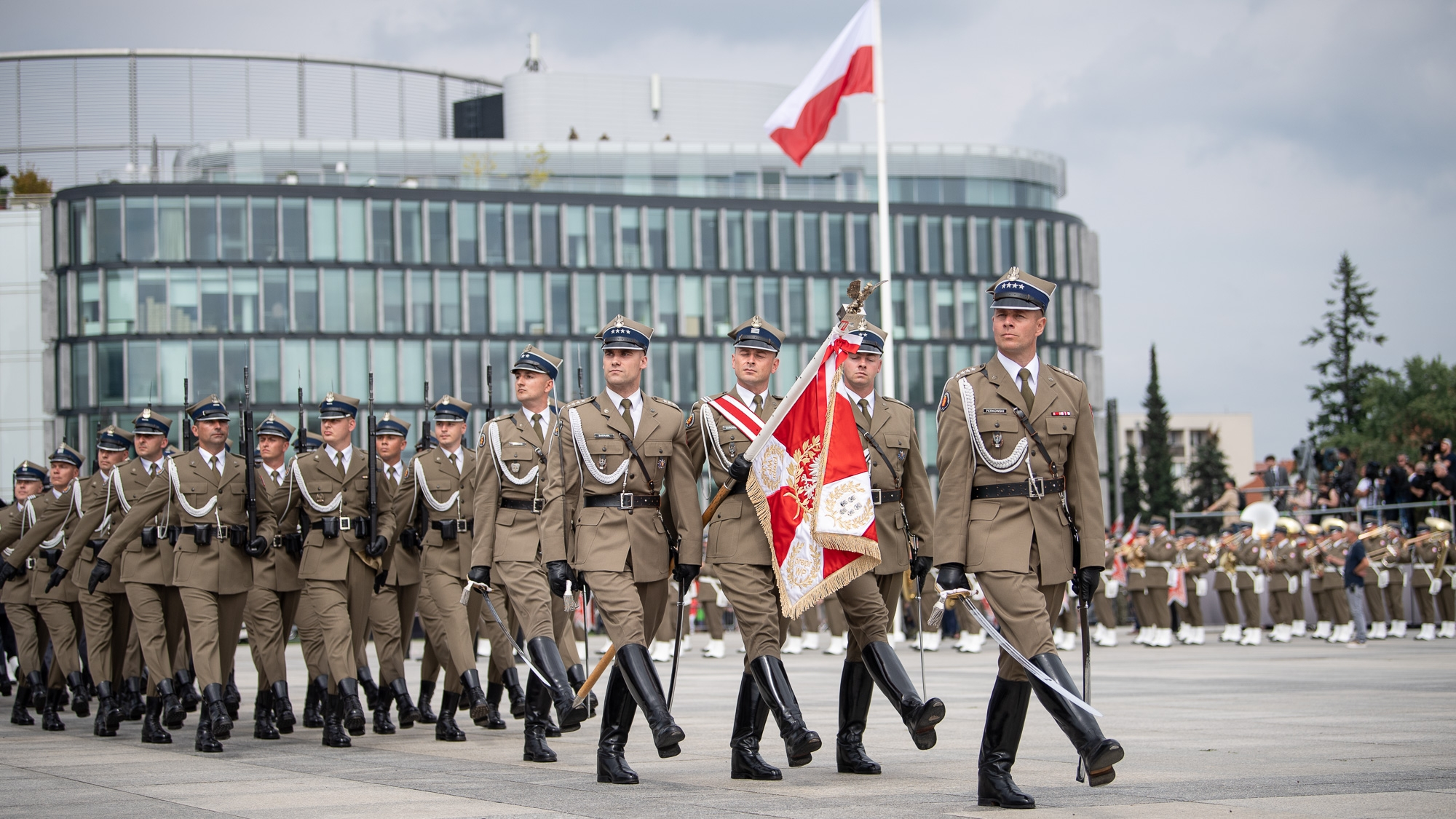
- Soldiers of the regiment on the Polish Armed Forces Day in 2022.
- Active: 1 January 2001; 25 years ago 31 March 2018; 7 years ago (current form)
- Country: Poland
- Type: Regiment
- Role: Honor Guard
- Part of: Warsaw Garrison Command
- Regimental HQ: Franciszka Hynka Street, Warsaw
- March: Inspection: Marsz Generalski; Marchpast: Warszawianka
- Equipment: SKS (1993-2018); MSBS rifle (since 2018)
- Website: Official website (in Polish)

Commanders
- Current commander: Col. Marcin Kujawa

Insignia
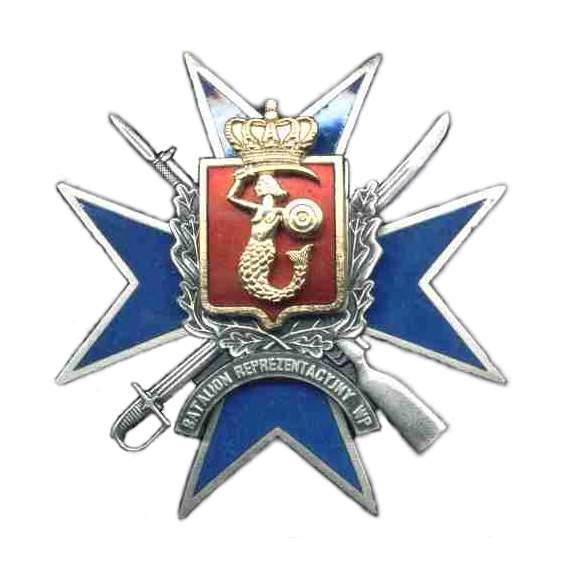
- Regimental Badge

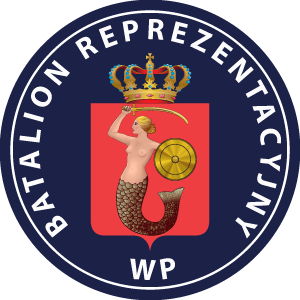
- Shoulder Patch

The Representative Regiment of the Polish Armed Forces (Note: or Polish Armed Forces' Representative Regiment, alternatively Honour Guard of the Polish Armed Forces or Representative Honour Guard Regiment of the Polish Armed Forces) (Polish: Pułk Reprezentacyjny Wojska Polskiego) is an Honor Guard unit of the Polish Armed Forces, of regimental size. It performs public duties for the armed forces and the President of Poland throughout the Warsaw Capital Garrison region and acts as the main drill and ceremony unit for the military. It performs during the annual Armed Forces Day parade on Ujazdów Avenue, during state arrival ceremonies at the Presidential Palace and alongside other honor units at the National Independence Day ceremony. The regiment has been described by President Andrzej Duda as one of "the best-drilled and organised formations in the world".

== History ==
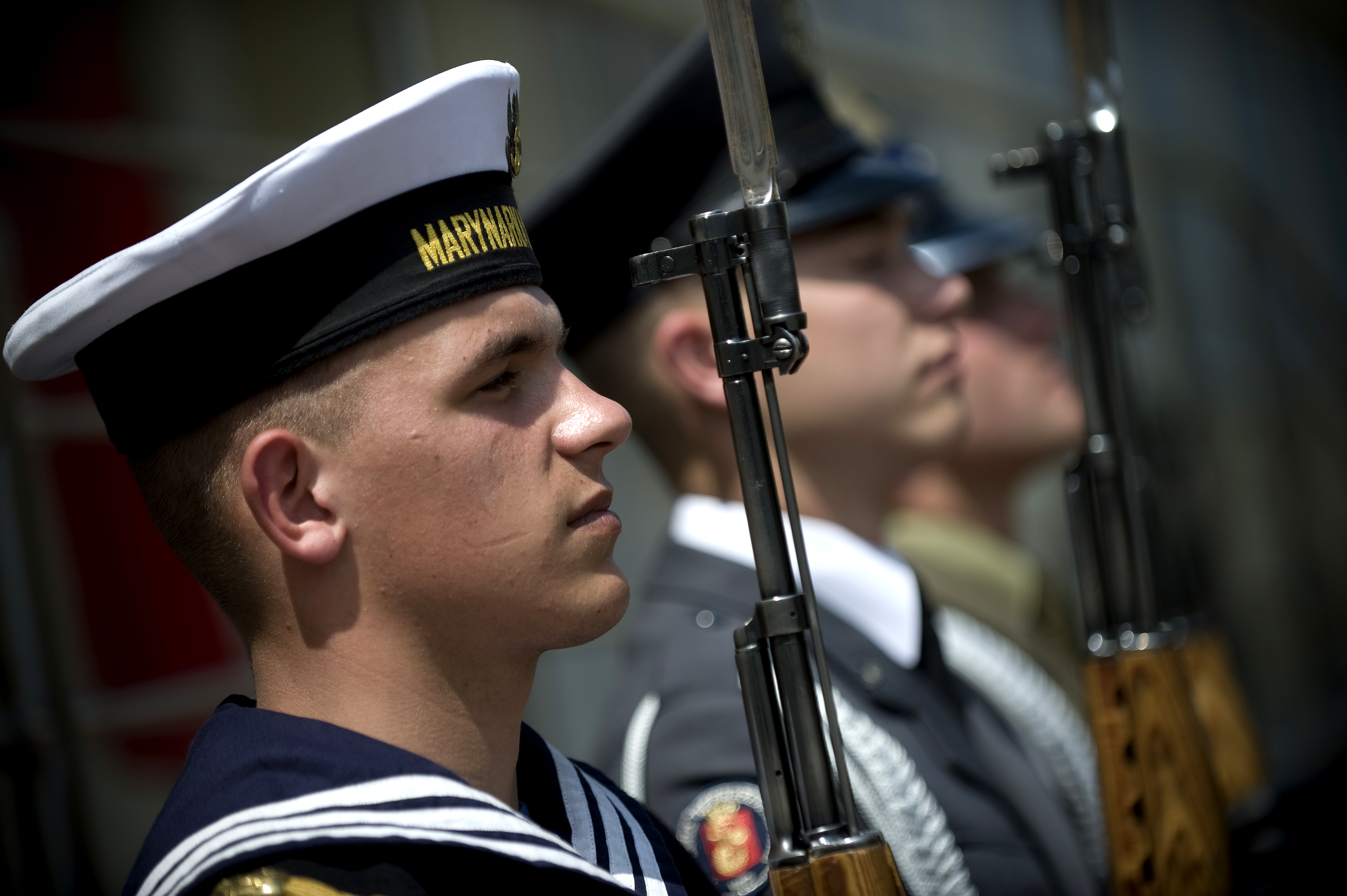
An honor guard for Admiral Mike Mullen during a full honors ceremony in June 2009.

The first honor guard unit of independent Poland was formed in 1954. In 1969, it was divided into the Representative Honor Guard Company of the Polish People's Army and the newly created State Honors Company. The first company represented the armed forces during state ceremonies while the second company was supposed to guard the Tomb of the Unknown Soldier, and other memorial sites in Poland. In 1982 the use of the Polish Rogatywka was restored to the soldiers of the guard of honor. The company was dissolved in 1990 following the fall of communism in the Polish People's Republic. The company was restored on January 1, 1993 with direct subordination to the Commander of the Warsaw Garrison. It eventually became the 1st Honor Guard Company of the Representative Honor Guard Battalion of the Armed Forces in 2001, acting as an independent joint-service formation with personnel from service branches of the armed forces. On 31 March 2018, the battalion became the 1st Guards Battalion, Representative Regiment of the Armed Forces, following yet another Armed Forces-wide reorganization of its ceremonial units. The regiment received its colors a year later at the Tomb of the Unknown Soldier in Warsaw by President Andrzej Duda.

== Composition ==
- Regimental HQ and HQ Company
- 1st Guards Battalion
  - No.1 Representative Company of the Polish Armed Forces (1 Kompania Reprezentacyjna Wojska Polskiego)
  - No.2 Representative Company of the Polish Armed Forces (2 Kompania Reprezentacyjna Wojska Polskiego)
  - No.3 Representative Company of the Polish Armed Forces (3 Kompania Reprezentacyjna Wojska Polskiego)
    - State Gun Salute Platoon (Pluton Salutowy, 4 field guns)
  - Representative Band of the Polish Armed Forces (Orkiestra Reprezentacyjna Wojska Polskiego)
    - Band HQ
    - Ceremonial Band A
    - Ceremonial Band B
  - Cavalry Squadron of the Polish Armed Forces (Szwadron Kawalerii Wojska Polskiego)

The personnel that make up this battalion come from the represents the three main service branches of the Armed Forces (Polish Army, Navy and Air Force). Until recently, the Polish Special Forces were also represented in the regiment at all state functions and were even present with the entire battalion on Red Square during the 2010 Moscow Victory Day Parade.

== List of commanders ==
- Lt. Col. Adam Wronecki (January 1, 2001 - May 16, 2002)
- Lt. Col. Roman Januszewski (May 17, 2002 - November 19, 2006)
- Lt. Col. Tomasz Dominikowski (November 20, 2006 - January 31, 2010)
- Lt. Col. Wojciech Erbel (February 1, 2010 - December 31, 2013)
- Col. Leszek Szczesniak (January 1, 2014 – November 18, 2016, March 31, 2018-present)
- Lt. Col. Włodzimierz Grochowiec (November 19, 2016 – December 5, 2016)
- Lt. Col. Sebastian Cichosz (December 6, 2016 - March 31, 2018)

== Gallery ==
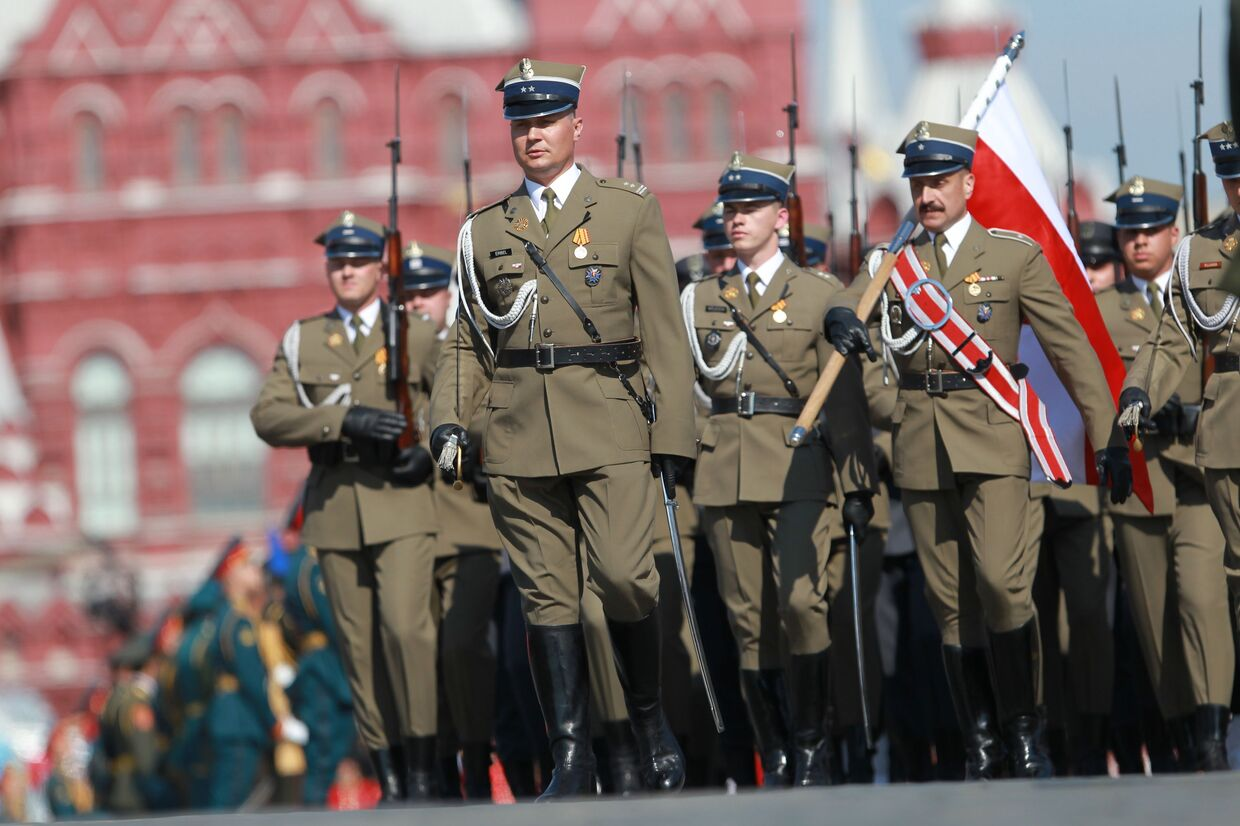
The Representative Land Force Company

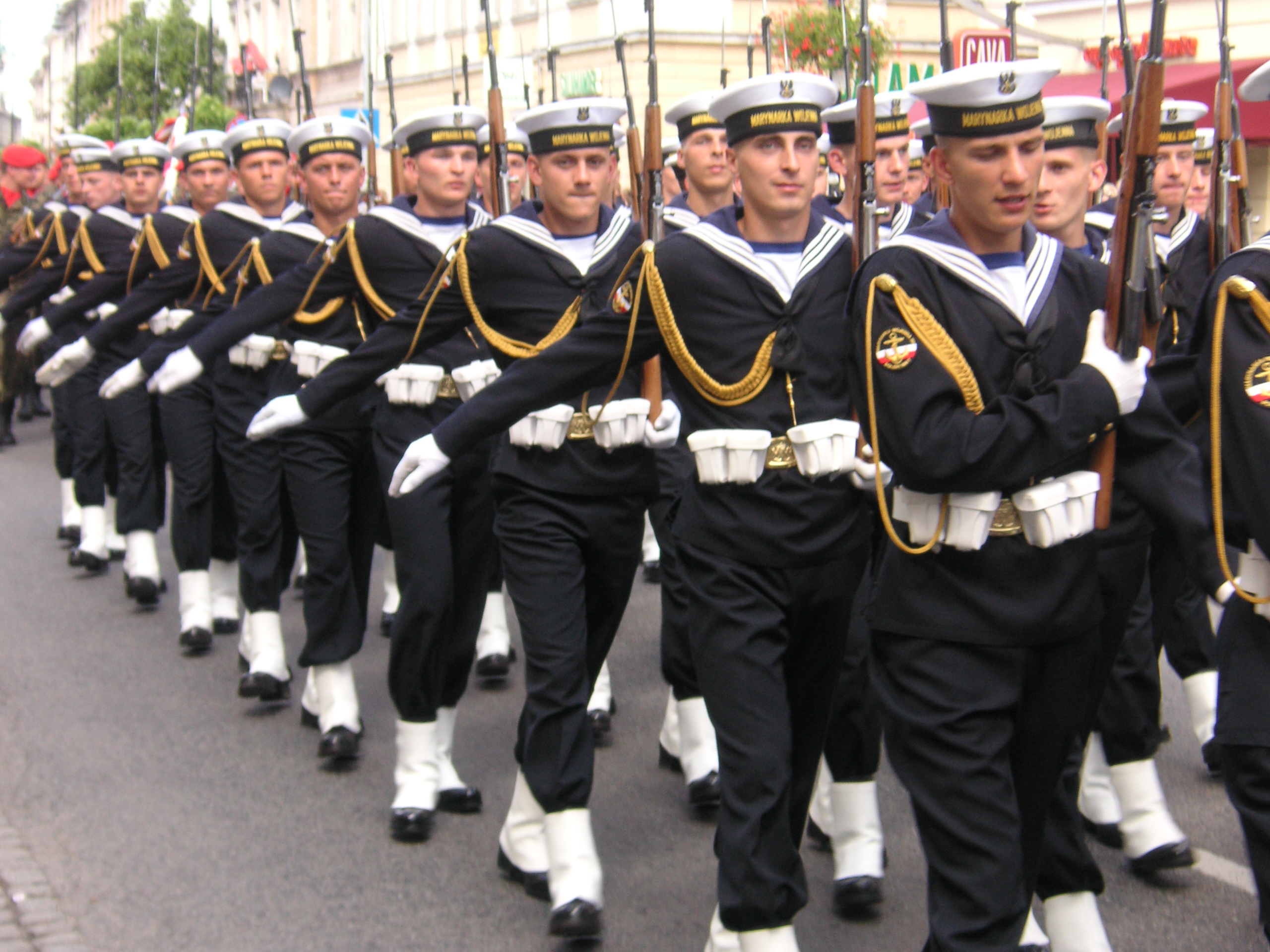
The Representative Navy Company

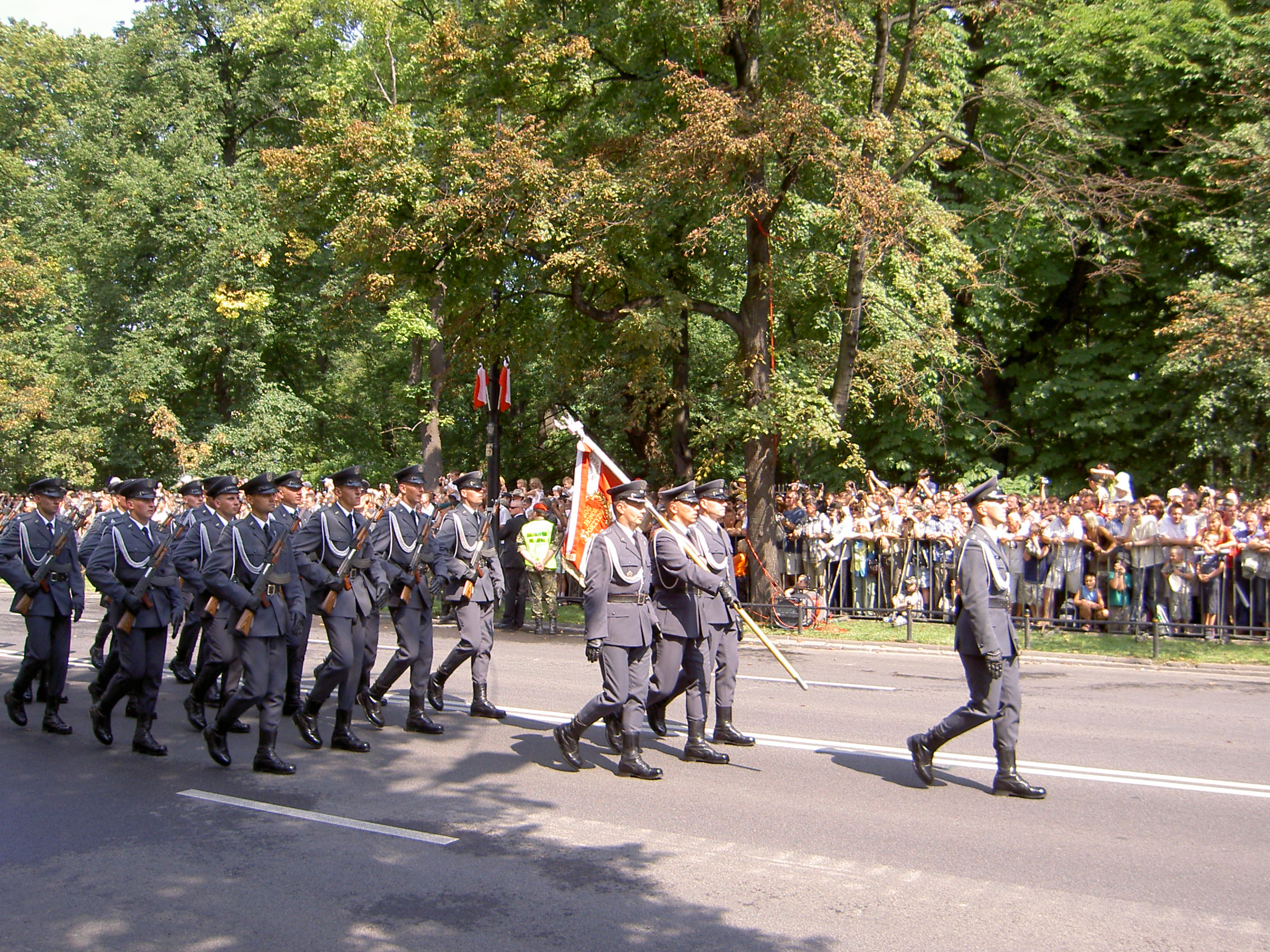
The Representative Air Force Company

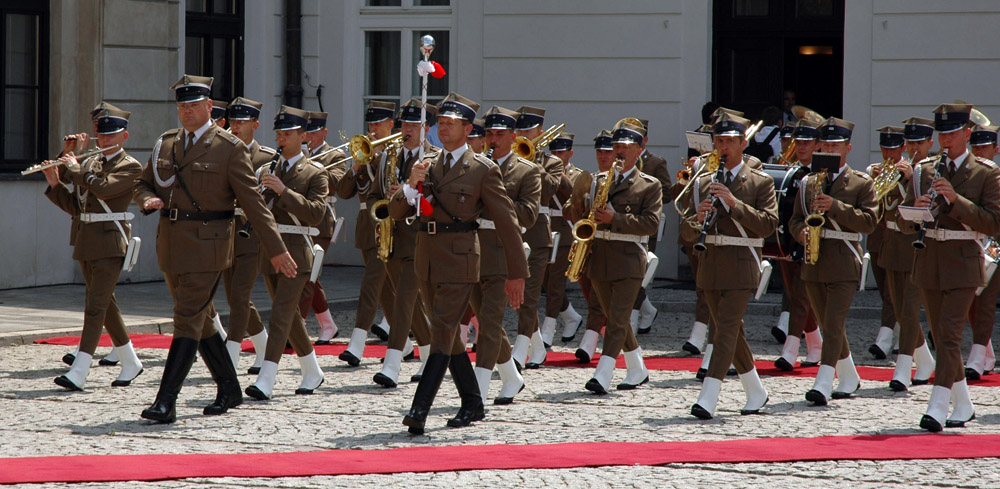
The regimental military band

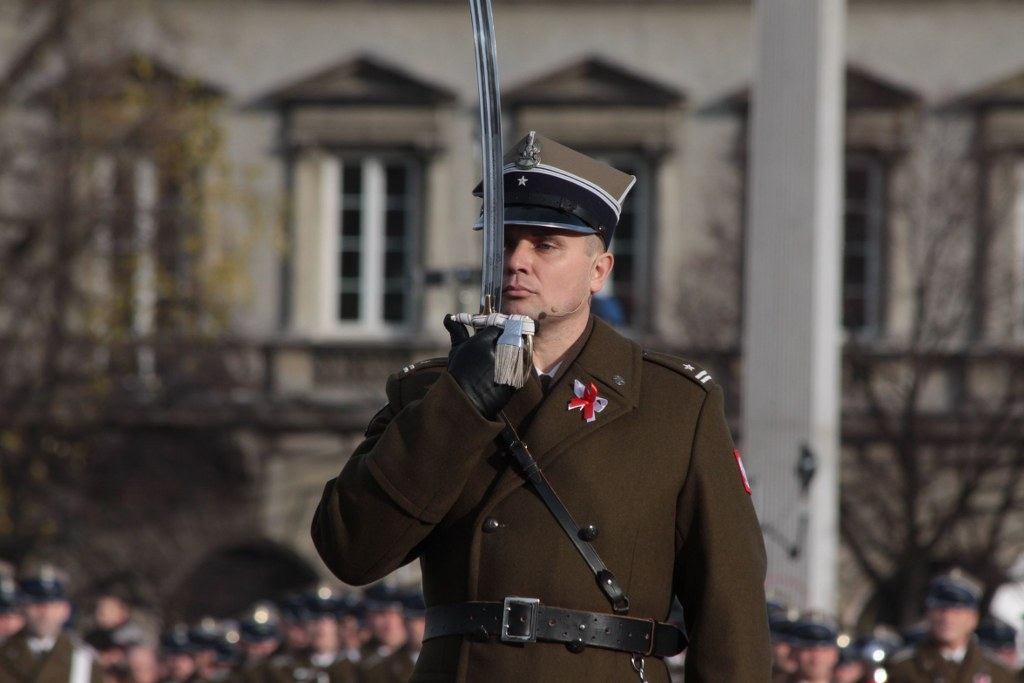
An officer of the regiment exercising the command of present arms.

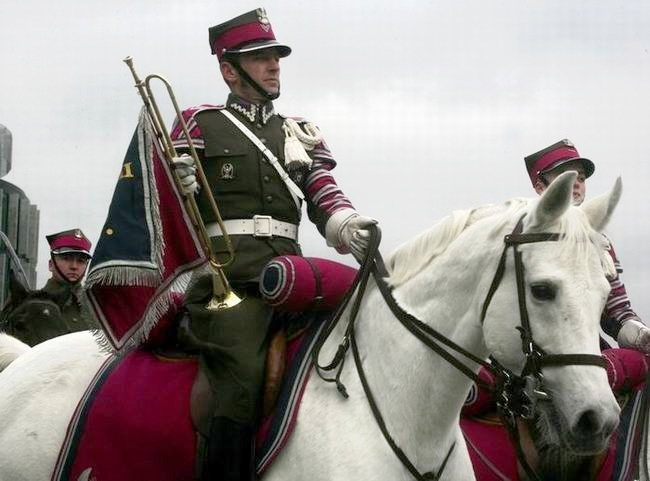
A fanfare trumpeter of the Presidential Mounted Squadron

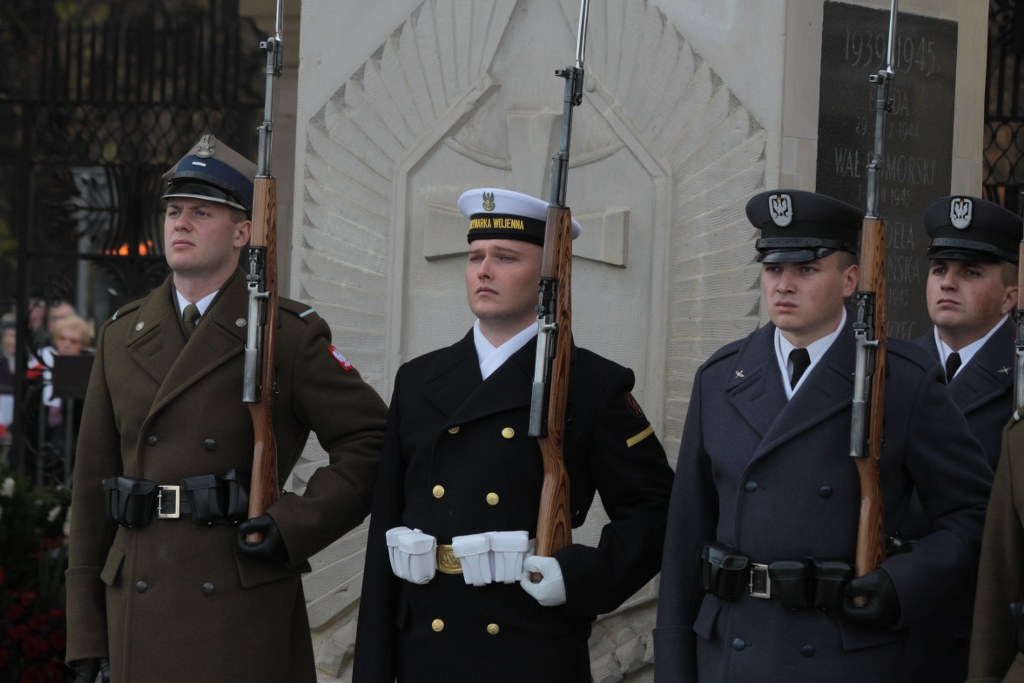
Members of the battalion representing the three service branches on National Independence Day in 2012.

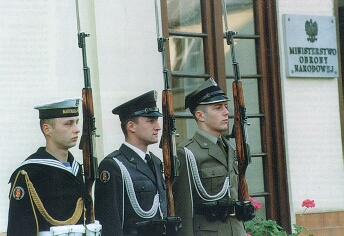
An honour guard representing the Polish Armed Forces in front of the Ministry of National Defence.

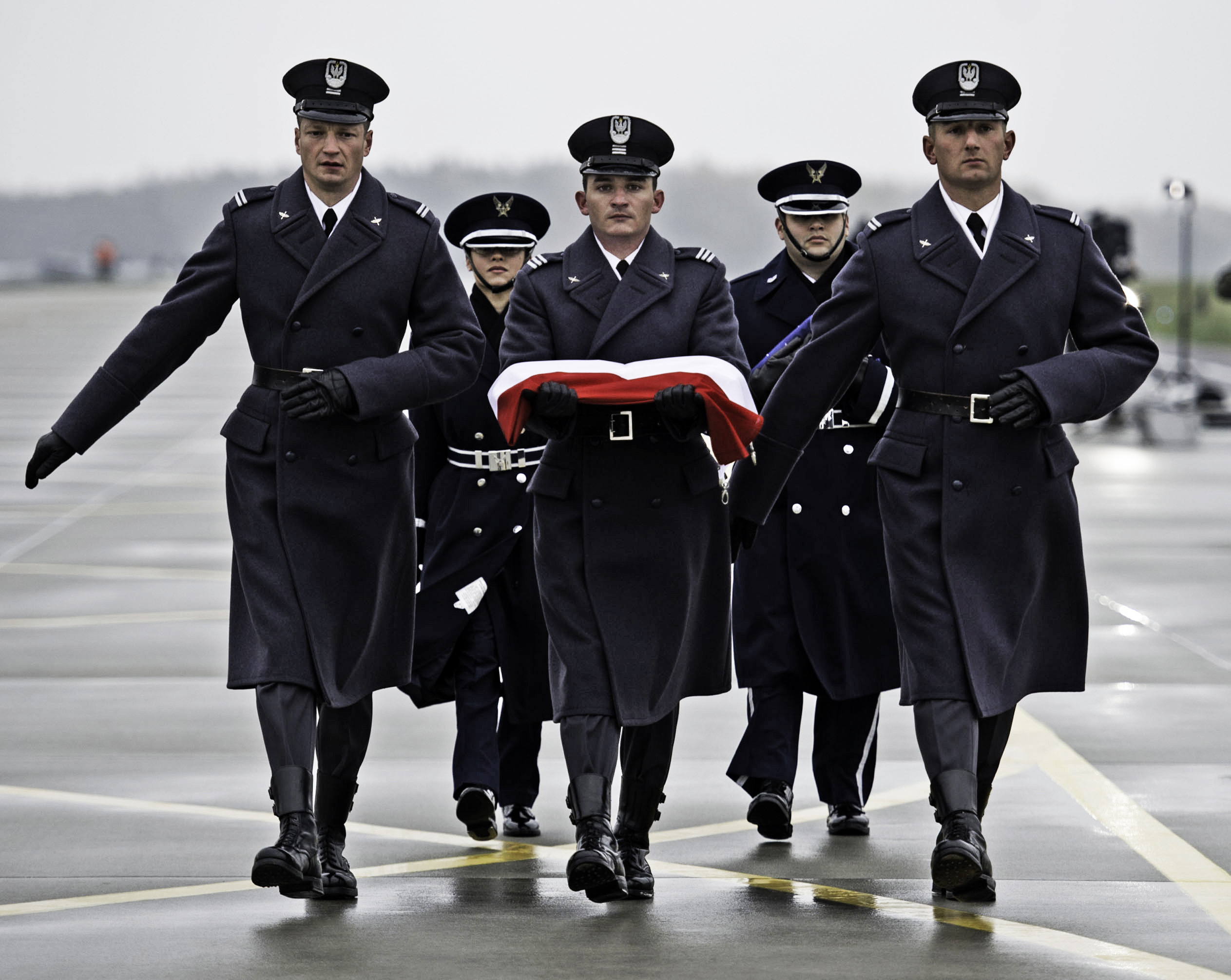
Polish and American Air Force honor guards at Lask Air Base in central Poland.

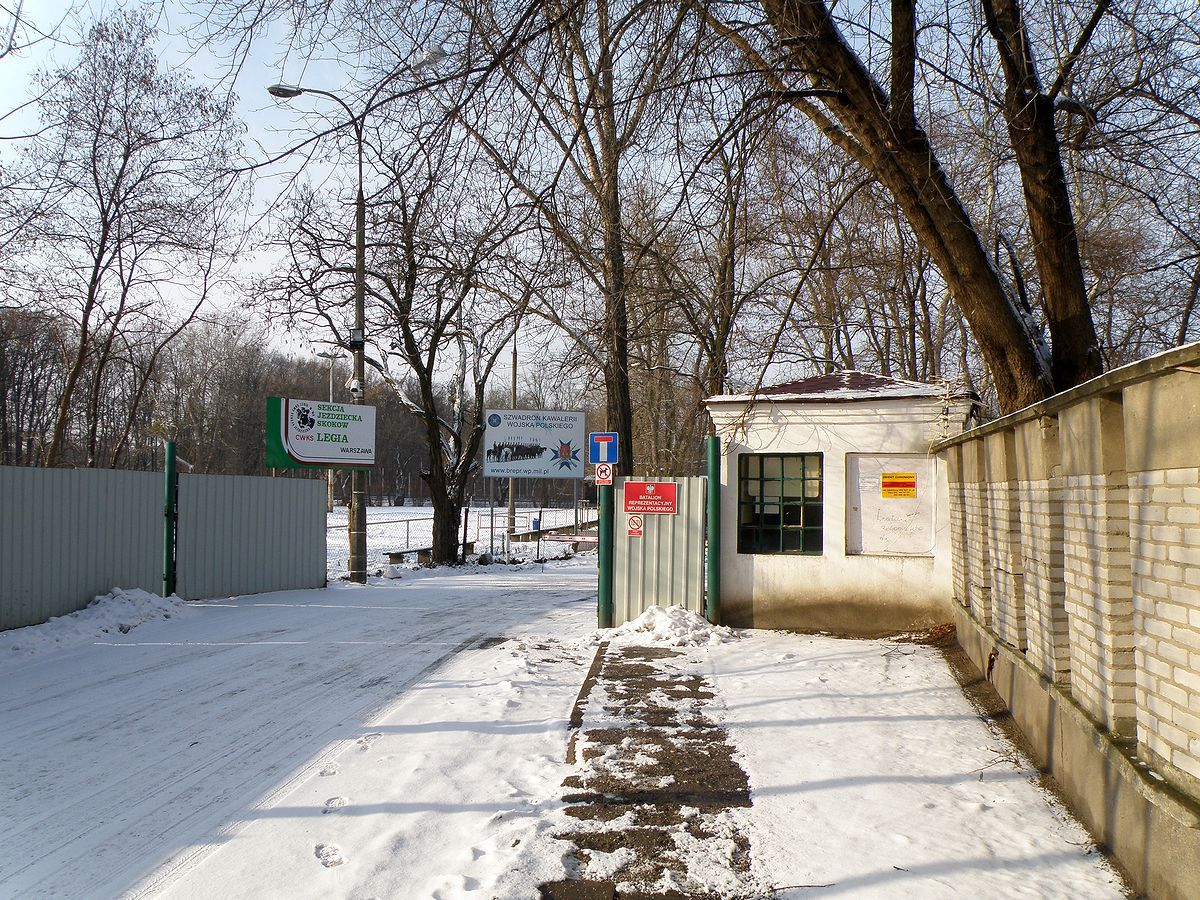
The regimental headquarters on Franciszka Hynka Street in Warsaw.

The changing of the guard performed by soldiers of the regiment at the Tomb of the Unknown Soldier, September 2008.

== See also ==
- Kompania Zamkowa
- 15th Poznań Uhlans Regiment
- Guard of honour
