= Warsaw Garrison Command =

Polish military unit

- Dowództwo Garnizonu Warszawa (Polish)
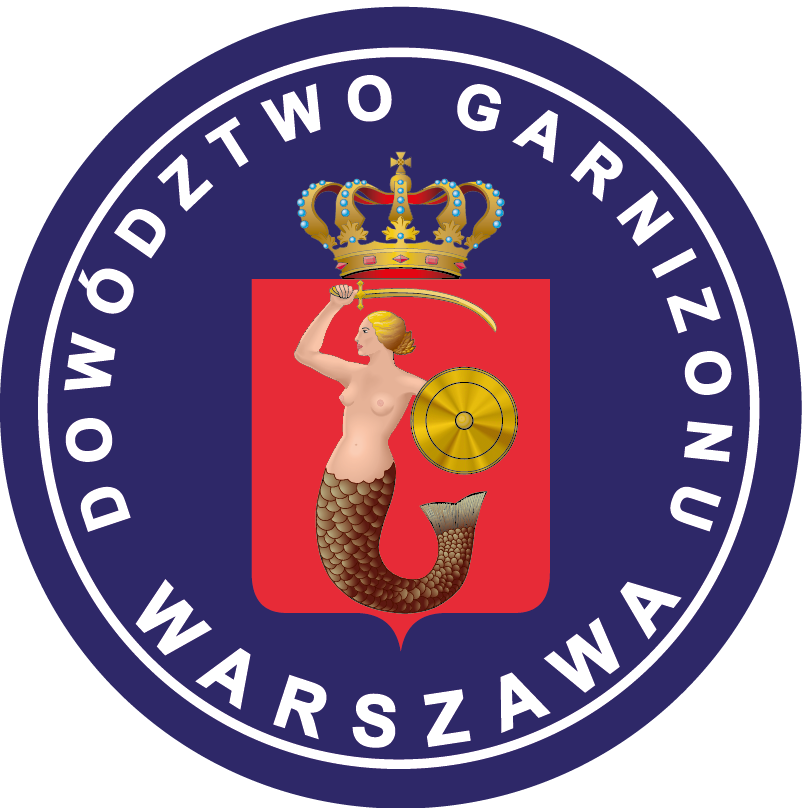
- Emblem
- Founded: 1 August 1995
- Country: Poland
- Part of: Polish Armed Forces
- Based at: Piłsudski Square 4, Warsaw
- Anniversaries: April 19
- Website: Official website (in English); Official website (in Polish)

Commanders
- Current commander: Brig. Gen. Tomasz Dominikowski
- Subordinate to: Minister of National Defence

The Warsaw Garrison Command (WGC) (Polish: Dowództwo Garnizonu Warszawa, DGW) is a stand-alone military unit subordinate to the Ministry of National Defence charged with providing operational, logistic and security support for the Ministry and central command units of the Polish Armed Forces, based in Warsaw military district (Polish: Garnizon Warszawa). Command's units also perform ceremonial duties during state visits, parades, other events and daily provide honour guarding of the Presidential Palace and the Tomb of Unknown Soldier.

The Command was established on 1 August 1995 as a successor to the Command existing since 1967 Provisioning Units Group Command of the Ministry of National Defence (Polish: Dowództwo Zgrupowania Jednostek Zabezpieczenia MON). Warsaw Garrison Commander has been Brig. Gen. Tomasz Dominikowski since 1 October 2021. Command's headquarters are located at former Military Courts building (4 Piłsudski Square) in central Warsaw. April 19 is Command's celebration day in remembrance of appointment of the first City of Warsaw Commandant after the victory of the Warsaw insurrection in 1794.

== Purpose ==
Warsaw Garrison Command supports the Ministry of National Defence (MoND), central command units of Polish Armed Forces (Polish General Staff, Armed Forces General Command, Armed Forces Operational Command) and other military units located within Warsaw garrison in order to enable their efficient and safe performance. Tasks performed by the soldiers subordinate to WGC include:

- physical security including access control of Ministerial and military facilities
- communication
- logistic support including transport of persons

== Subordinate units ==
Following military units are subordinate to the Warsaw Garrison Command:

- 15th Sieradz Support of Command Brigade (15 Sieradzka Brygada Wsparcia Dowodzenia) in Sieradz
- Security Regiment (Pułk Ochrony) in Warsaw
- 10th Wrocław Command Regiment (10 Wrocławski Pułk Dowodzenia) in Wrocław
- 10th Warsaw Automobile Regiment (10 Warszawski Pułk Samochodowy) in Warsaw
- Representative Regiment of the Polish Armed Forces (Pułk Reprezentacyjny Wojska Polskiego) in Warsaw
- Warsaw Garrison Command Supportive Unit (Oddział Zabezpieczenia Dowództwa Garnizonu Warszawa) in Warsaw
- Supportive Unit (Oddział Zabezpieczenia) in Warsaw
- Capital's Garrison Supportive Unit (Oddział Zabezpieczenia Garnizonu Stołecznego) in Warsaw
- Military Physical Training Facility (Wojskowy Ośrodek Szkoleniowo-Kondycyjny) in Mrągowo
- 24th Field Technical Base of Signal Troops (24 Polowa Techniczna Baza Wojsk Łączności) in Opole
- Ministry of National Defence Representative Estate (Ośrodek Reprezentacyjny Ministerstwa Obrony Narodowej) in Pruszków
- Warsaw Garrison Command Club (Klub Dowództwa Garnizonu Warszawa) – community center in Warsaw
- Special Publications' Printing House (Drukarnia Wydawnictw Specjalnych) in Warsaw

Military bands subordinate to the Command are:

- Military Band in Elbląg
- Military Band in Giżyck
- Military Band in Lublin
- Military Band in Szczecin
- Military Band in Siedlce
- Military Band in Żagań
- Representative Band of the Polish Navy in Gdynia
- Military Band in Świnoujście
- Military Band in Koszalin
- Representative Band of the Polish Air Force in Poznań
- Representative Band of the Polish Land Forces in Wrocław
- Military Band in Bytom
- Military Band in Bydgoszcz
- Military Band in Toruń
- Military Band in Radom
- Military Band in Dęblin
- Representative Band of the Polish Armed Forces in Warsaw
- Military Band in Kraków
- Military Band in Rzeszów

== Leadership ==
- Warsaw Garrison Commander – Brig. Gen. Tomasz Dominikowski (since 1 October 2021)

== Gallery ==
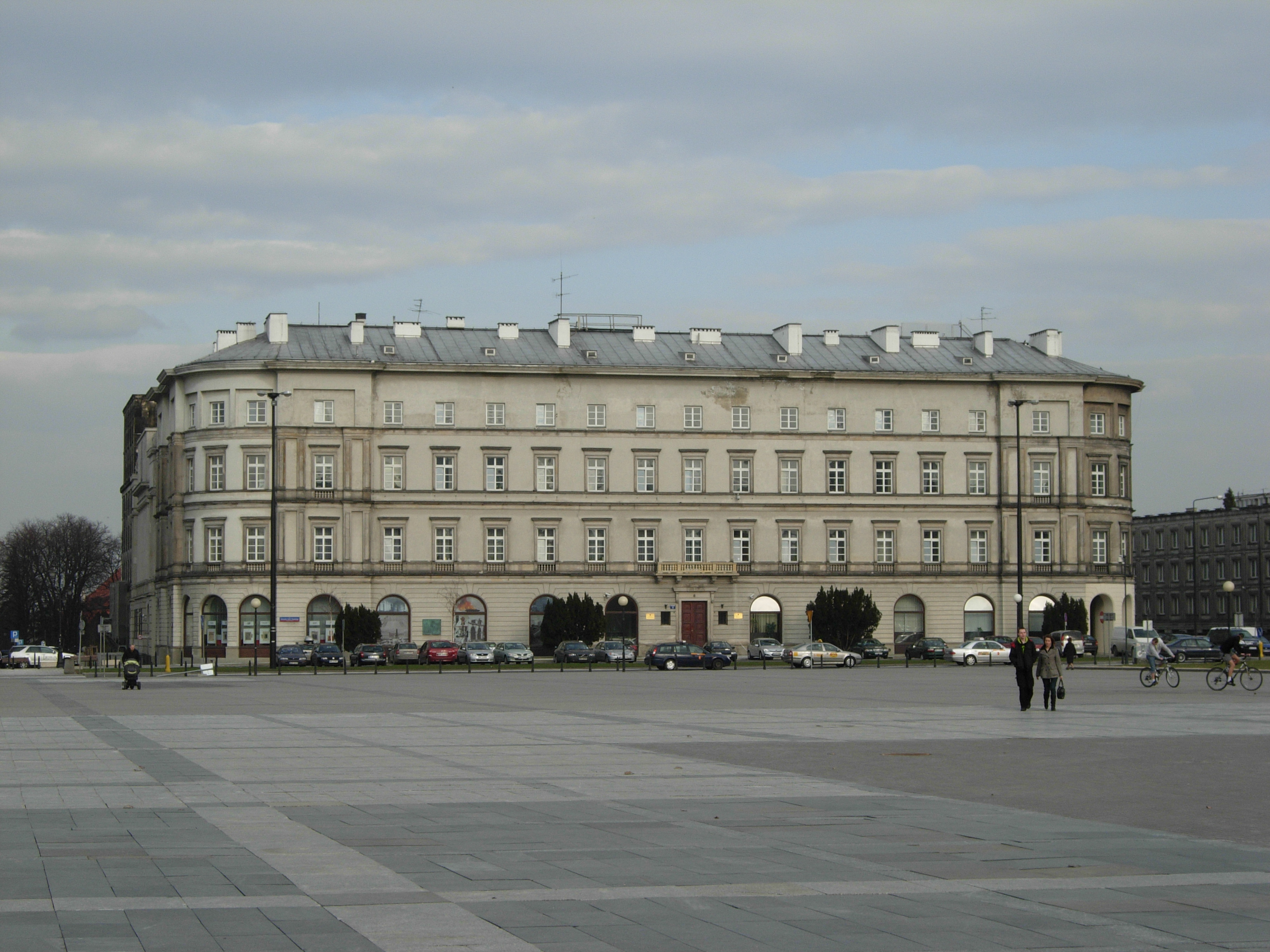
Former Military Courts building, nowadays Warsaw Garrison Command headquarters viewed from the Piłsudski Square.

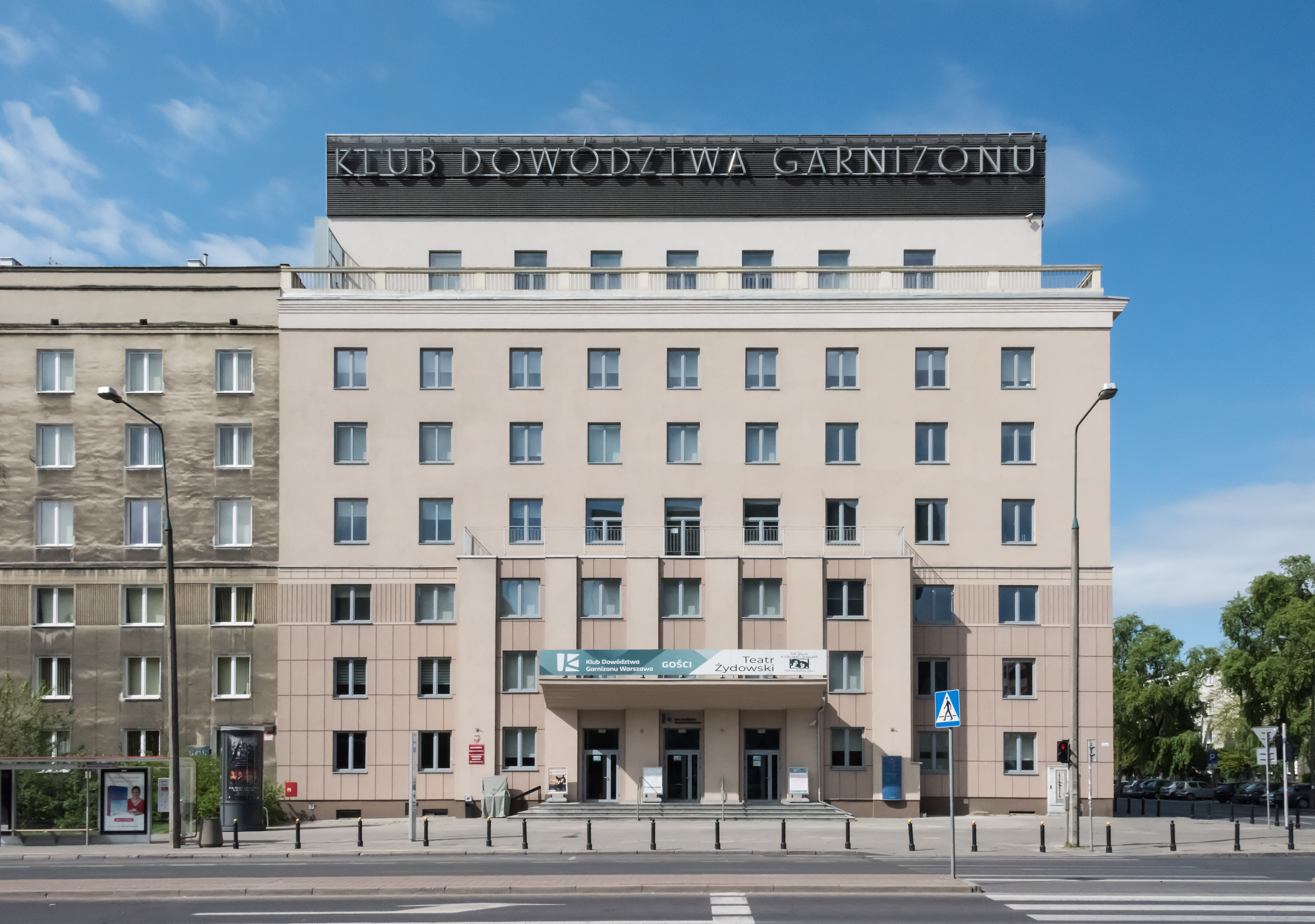
Warsaw Garrison Command Club, Niepodległości Avenue, Warsaw

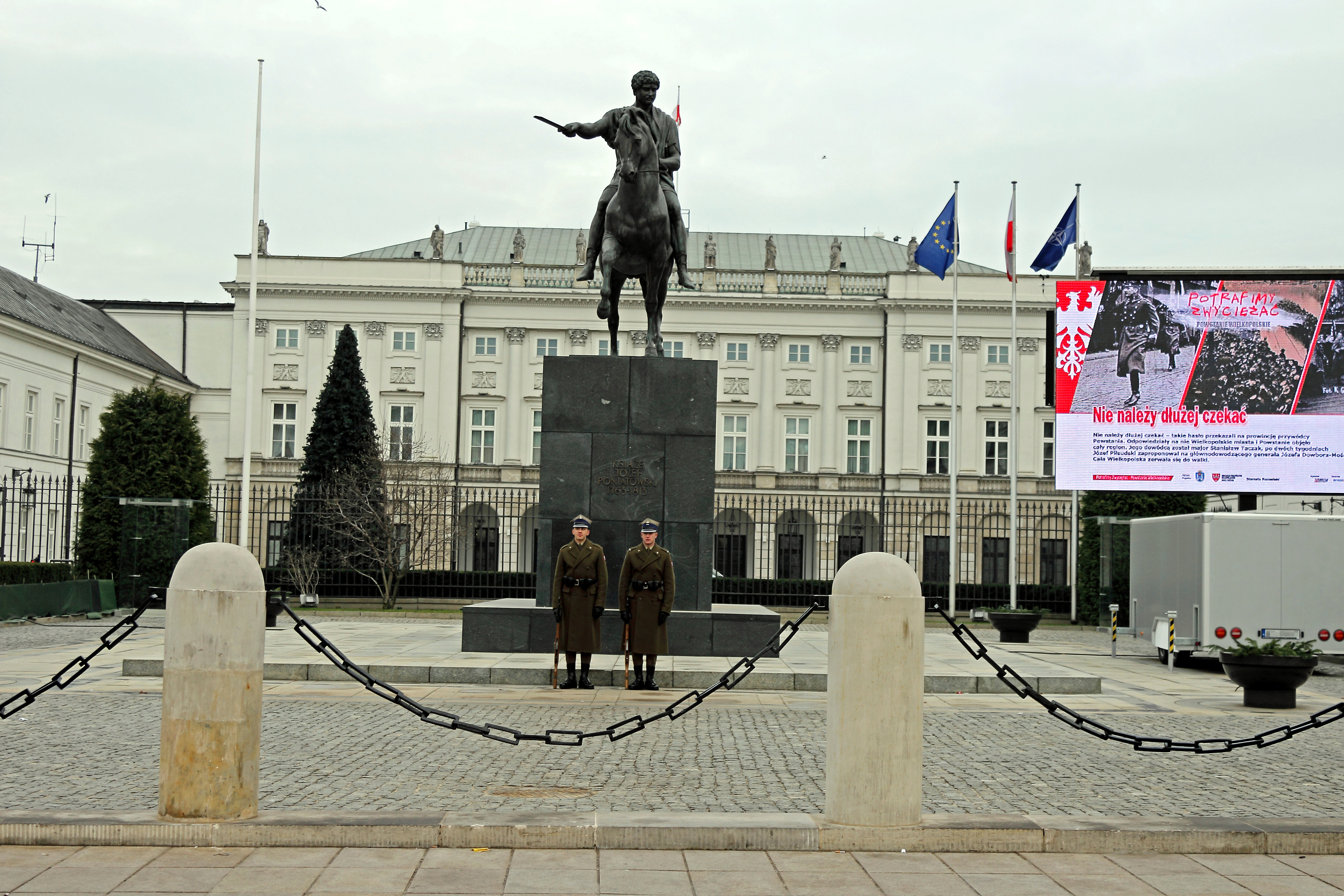
Honour guards of Representative Honour Guard Regiment in front of Presidential Palace.

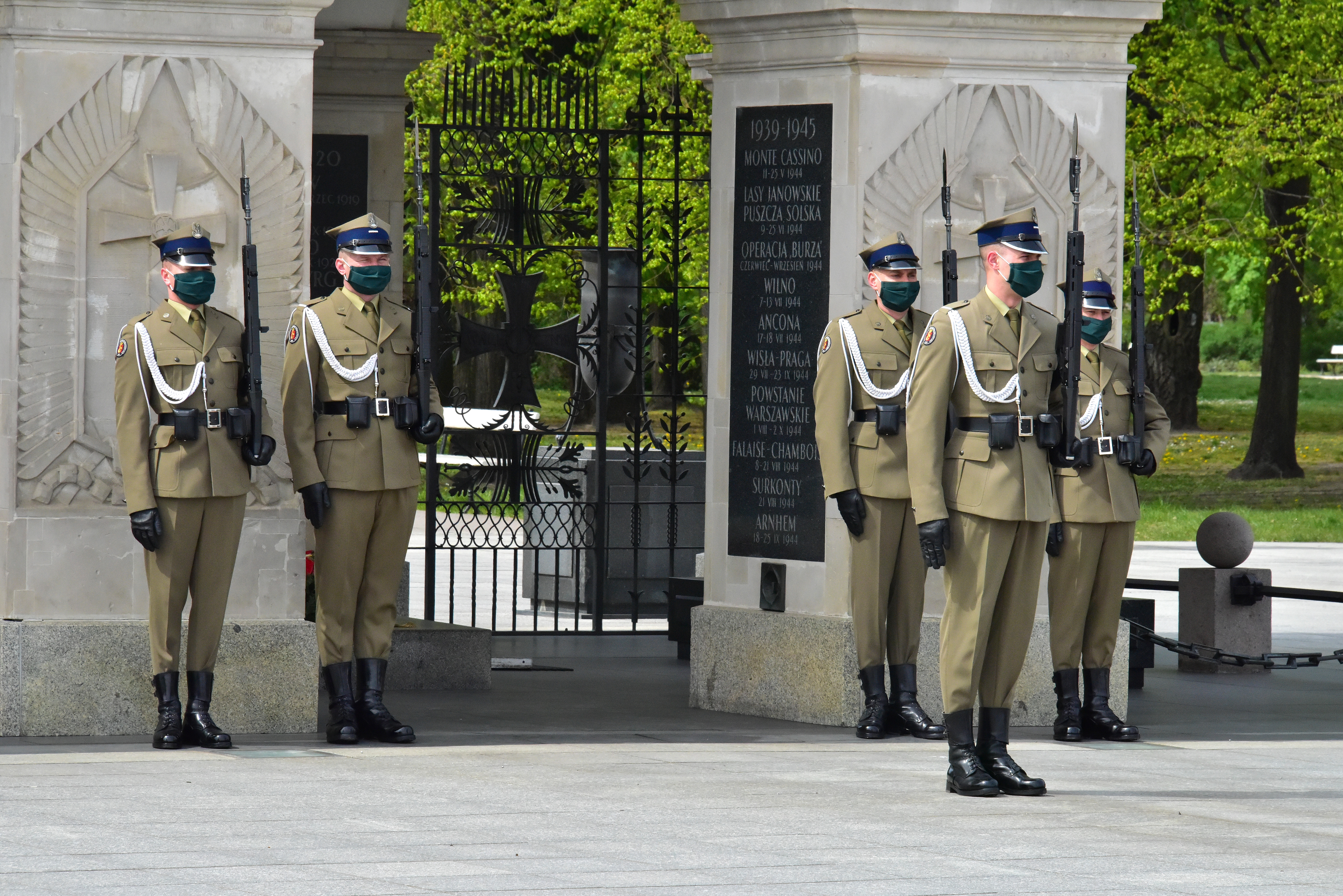
Changing of honour guards from Representative Honour Guard Regiment in front of the Tomb of Unknown Soldier in Piłsudski Square.

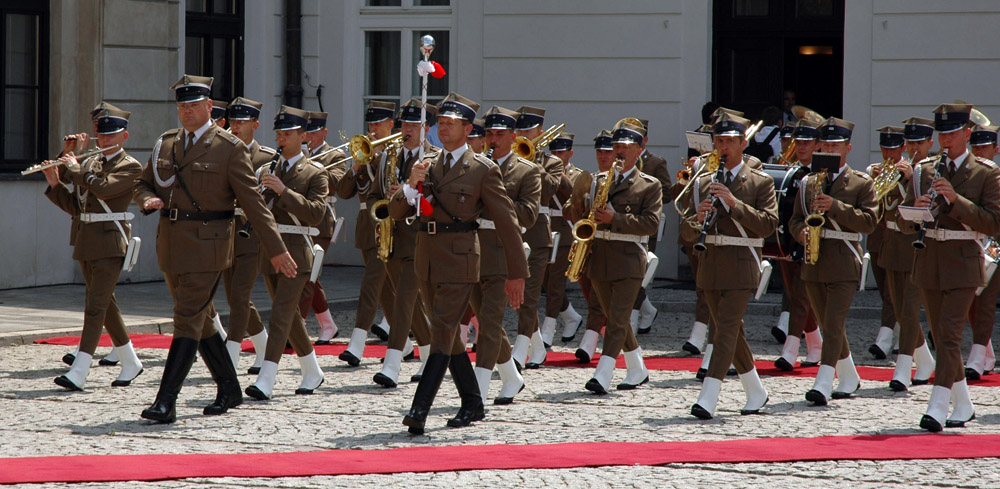
Representative Band of the Polish Armed Forces performing in front of Presidential Palace.

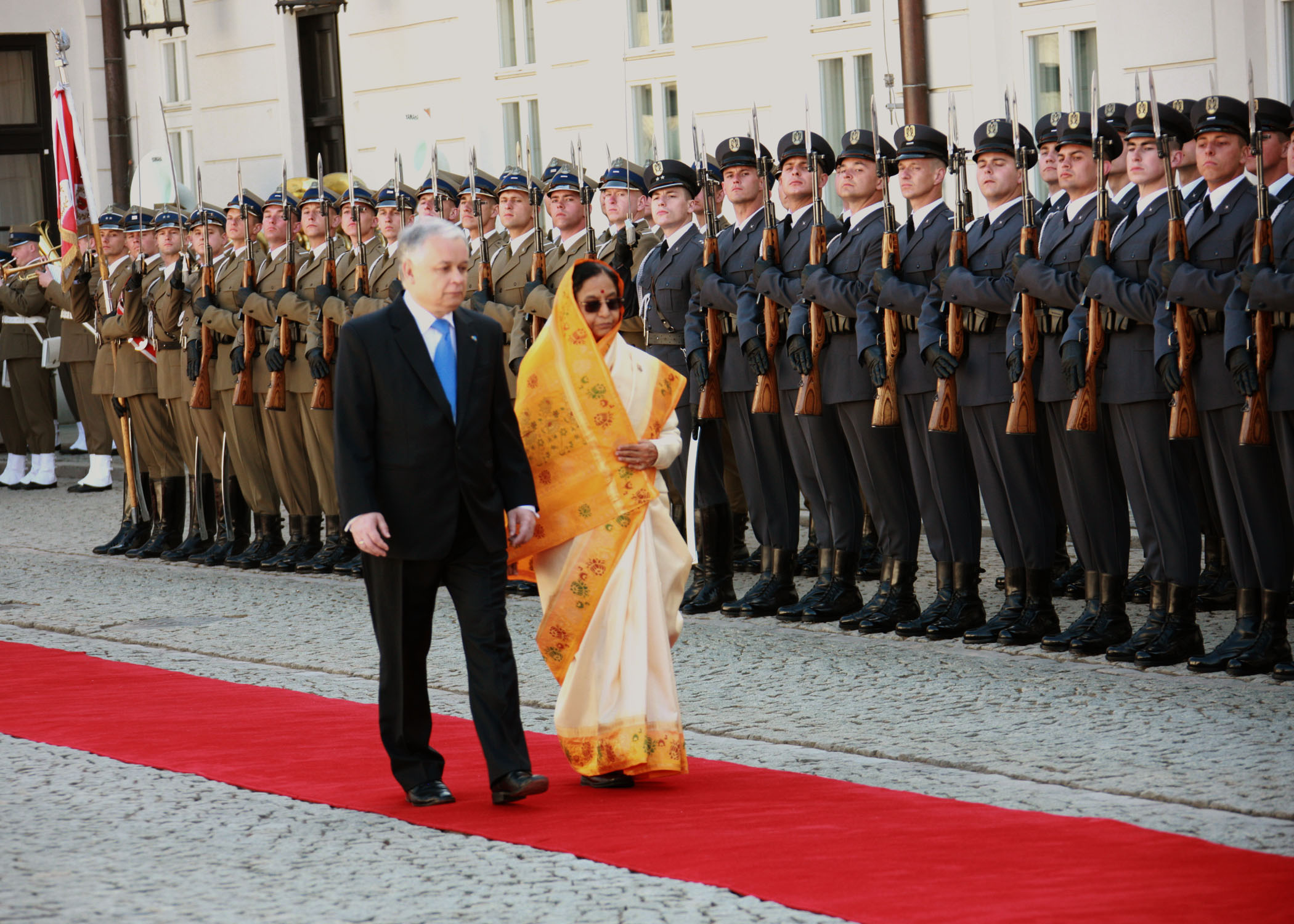
The President of India Pratibha Patil with Polish President Lech Kaczyński inspecting honour guard during her state visit in Poland.
