= Marsz Generalski =

Polish patriotic march

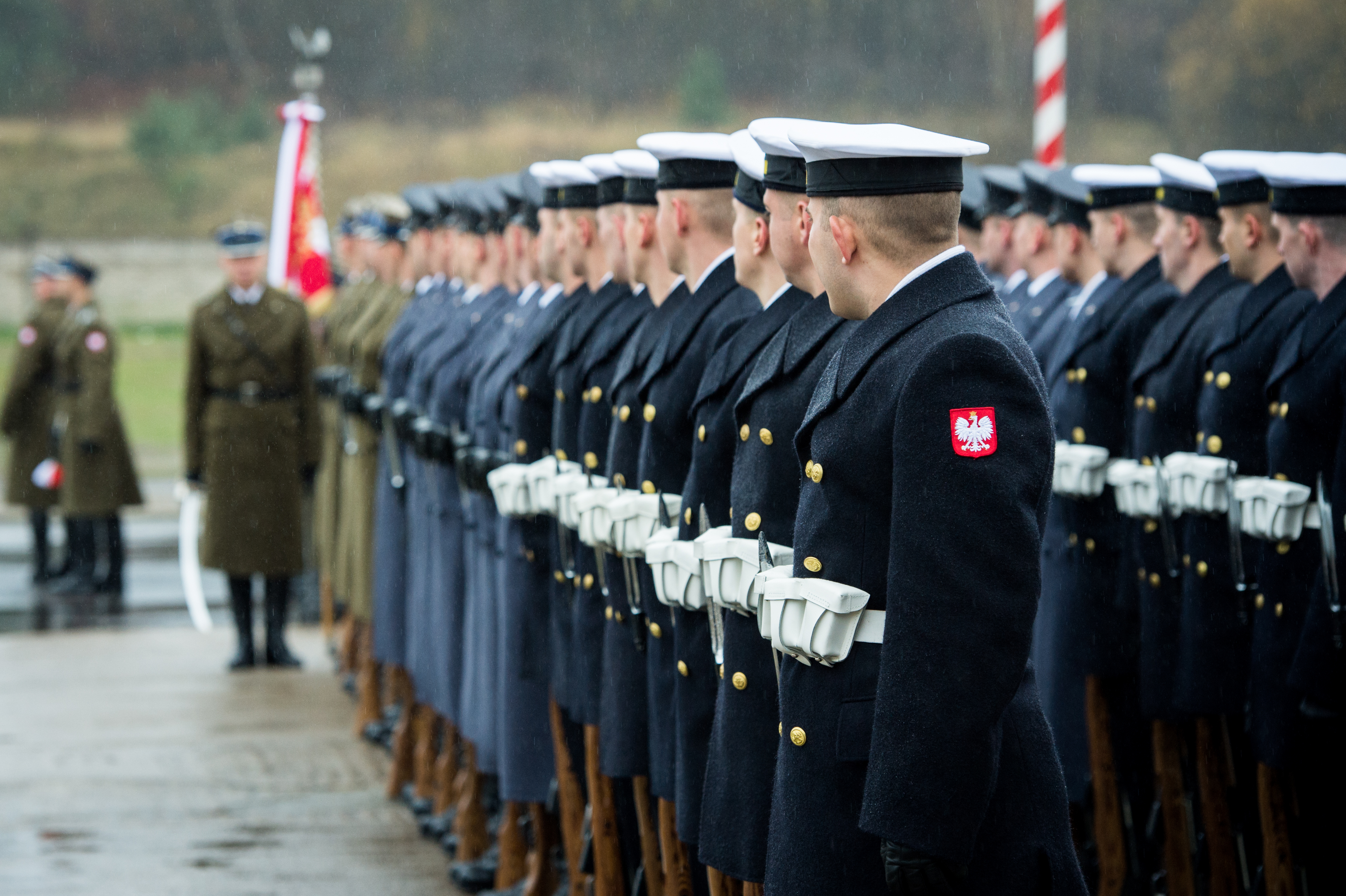
The march is the official slow march of the Representative Honor Guard Regiment of the Polish Armed Forces (seen here).

Marsz Generalski (English: The General's March) is a notable Polish patriotic march and the official parade tune of the Polish Armed Forces and the Polish Police. It was composed in 1919 by Henryk Melcer-Szczawiński and was selected in a competition to be the representative military slow march. The General's March is played during the inspection of troops by military commanders, politicians and visiting foreign heads of state.

== See also ==
- Polish Armed Forces
- Whirlwinds of Danger
- Warszawianka (1831)

== Links ==
- Audio of the march
