= We Are the First Brigade =

Anthem of the Polish Land Forces

My, Pierwsza Brygada
English: We Are the First Brigade
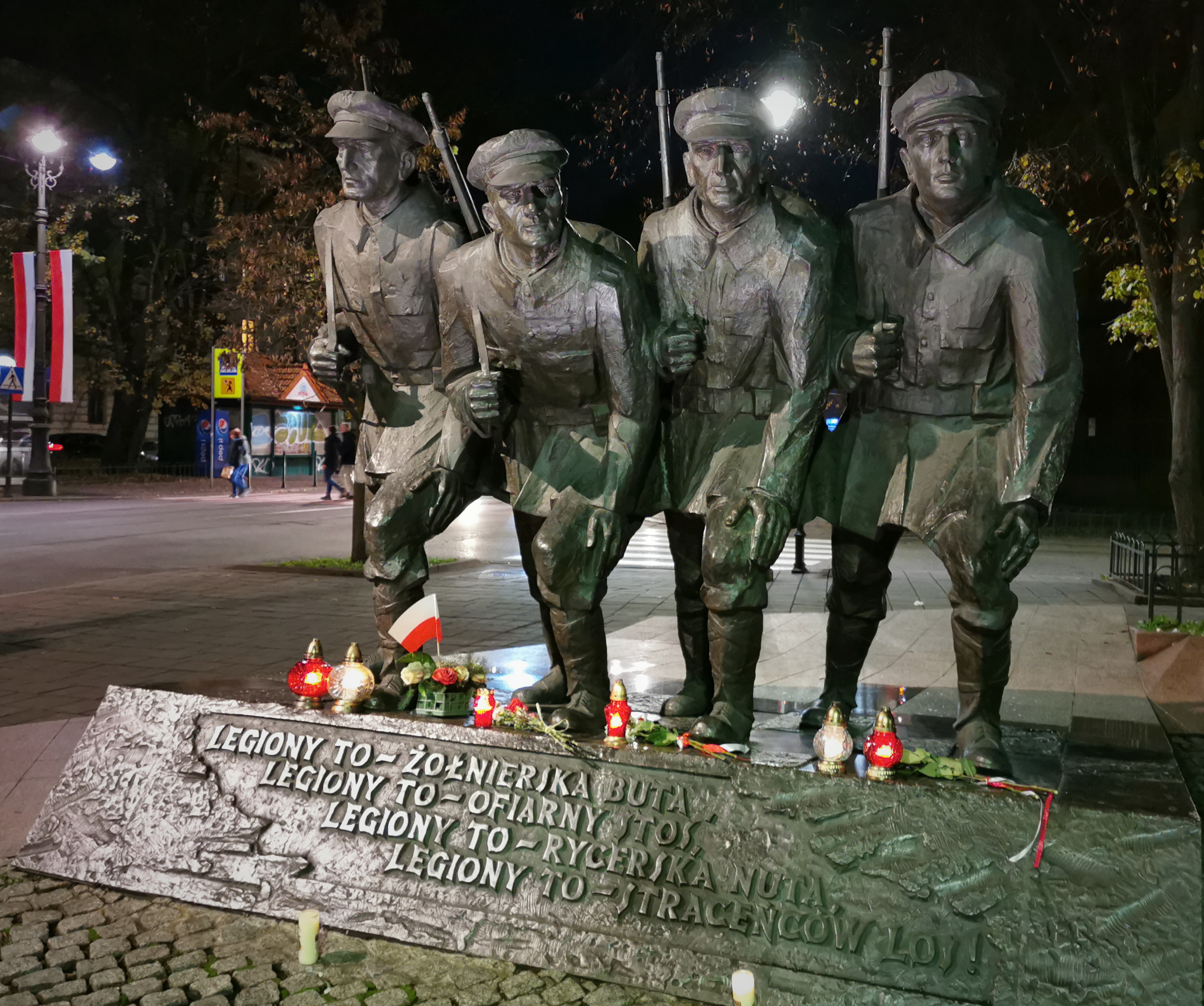
- A monument dedicated to the Polish Legions in Kraków displaying the first four lines of one of the versions of "My, Pierwsza Brygada"
- Anthem of Polish Land Forces
- Also known as: Marsz Pierwszej Brygady (English: The March of the First Brigade); Legiony to żołnierska nuta (English: The Legions Are a Soldiers' Song)
- Lyrics: Colonel Andrzej Hałaciński and Legions officer Tadeusz Biernacki, 1917

"We Are the First Brigade" performed by Stanisław Ratold-Zadarnowski (1893-1926)

"My, Pierwsza Brygada" (We Are the First Brigade, lit. 'We, the First Brigade'), also known as Marsz Pierwszej Brygady (The March of the First Brigade) and Legiony to żołnierska nuta (The Legions Are the Soldiers' Song), is one of the best-known patriotic marches of the Polish Legions formed during World War I by Józef Piłsudski.

Extolling the First Brigade of the Polish Legions, the song is considered an important emblem of the early-20th-century struggle for Polish independence. It is also now an official anthem of the Polish Army.

The song melody was borrowed from Kielce March #10 in the songbook of the Kielce Fire Department band. It had probably been composed by Captain Andrzej Brzuchal-Sikorski, the band's conductor from 1905, and later bandmaster of the First Brigade of the Polish Legions. It was he who arranged and first conducted the song.

The earliest recognized version of the song appeared in 1917, with the lyrics written spontaneously during the war by several individuals including Colonel Andrzej Hałaciński and Legions officer Tadeusz Biernacki.

Between the May Coup and the designation of Mazurek Dąbrowskiego as the national anthem of Poland in February 1927, many of Piłsudski's supporters viewed the song as the interim national anthem.

== Lyrics ==
Polish

Legiony to żołnierska nuta,
Legiony to ofiarny stos,
Legiony to żołnierska buta,
Legiony to straceńców los,

My, Pierwsza Brygada,
Strzelecka gromada,
Na stos rzuciliśmy
Nasz życia los,
Na stos, na stos!

O, ile mąk, ile cierpienia,
O, ile krwi, wylanych łez,
Pomimo to nie ma zwątpienia,
Dodawał sił wędrówki kres.

My, Pierwsza Brygada…

Krzyczeli, żeśmy stumanieni,
Nie wierząc nam, że chcieć – to móc!
Laliśmy krew osamotnieni,
A z nami był nasz drogi Wódz!

My, Pierwsza Brygada…

Nie chcemy dziś od was uznania,
Ni waszych mów ni waszych łez,
Już skończył się czas kołatania
Do waszych serc, do waszych kies!

My, Pierwsza Brygada…

Umieliśmy w ogień zapału
Młodzieńczych wiar rozniecić skry,
Nieść życie swe dla ideału
I swoją krew i marzeń sny.

My, Pierwsza Brygada…

Potrafim dziś dla potomności
Ostatki swych poświęcić dni,
Wśród fałszów siać siew szlachetności,
Miazgą swych ciał żarem swej krwi.

My, Pierwsza Brygada…

English

The Legions are the soldiers' song,
The Legions are the sacrificial pyre,
The Legions are the soldiers' pride,
The Legions are the soldiers' fate

We, the First Brigade,
a group of shooters,
We've thrown on the pyre
Our life's fate
on the pyre, on the pyre.

How much suffering and toil,
How much blood and tears have flowed,
despite it all there's no doubt
that the end of the journey gave us strength

We, the First Brigade…

They cried that we had gone stark mad
Not believing us that there's a way! .
Bereft of all, we've shed our blood
With our dear leader at our side!

We, the First Brigade…

We want nothing of your acclaim,
Nor your tears nor your words.
We're done with making claim
To your hearts, to your purse!

We, the First Brigade…

We've fanned the fire of zeal
From the sparks of steadfast youth,
Carried our lives for an ideal
And our blood and hope dreams

We, the First Brigade…

For the sake of posterity,
We'll devote the rest of our days,
To sow honor 'mid duplicity,
Heedless both to blame and to praise.

We, the First Brigade…
