= Operational structure of the Polish Land Forces =

The full structure of the Polish Land Forces is:

== Armed Forces General Command ==
The Inspector Land Forces, a two-star, major-general equivalent, reports to Commander, Armed Forces General Command, a three-star, general broni.

Separately and without seemingly any responsibility to the Inspector Land Forces, the divisions of the Polish Land Forces also report, separately, to the Commander, Armed Forces General Command.

=== 1st Legions Infantry Division ===
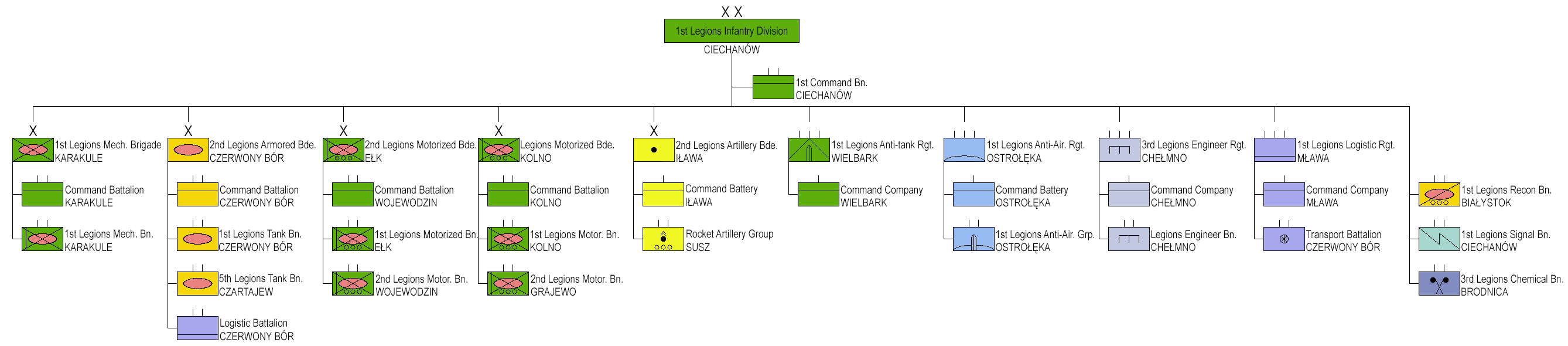
1st Legions Infantry Division organisation 2025 (click image to enlarge)

The 1st Legions Infantry Division was reactivated on 9 January 2023. The division is currently being formed and will reach full operational capability at the end of the decade. The division will be the largest Polish formation and equipped with Polish and South Korean equipment. As of 2025 the 1st Legions Infantry Division consists of the following units:

- 1st Legions Infantry Division "Marshal Józef Piłsudski", in Ciechanów
  - 1st Command Battalion, in Ciechanów
  - 1st Legions Mechanized Brigade, in Karakule
    - Command Battalion, in Karakule
    - 1st Legions Mechanized Battalion, in Karakule
  - 2nd Legions Armored Brigade, in Czerwony Bór
    - Command Battalion, in Czerwony Bór
    - 1st Legions Tank Battalion, in Czerwony Bór
    - 5th Legions Tank Battalion, in Czartajew
    - Logistic Battalion, in Czerwony Bór
  - 2nd Legions Motorized Brigade, in Ełk
    - Command Battalion, in Wojewodzin
    - 1st Legions Motorized Battalion, in Ełk
    - 2nd Legions Motorized Battalion, in Wojewodzin
  - Legions Motorized Brigade, in Kolno (forming)
    - Command Battalion, in Kolno
    - 1st Legions Motorized Battalion, in Kolno
    - 2nd Legions Motorized Battalion, in Grajewo
  - 2nd Legions Artillery Brigade, in Iława
    - Command Battery, in Iława
    - Rocket Artillery Group, in Susz with Homar-K multiple rocket launchers
  - 1st Legions Anti-Tank Regiment, in Wielbark
    - Command Company, in Wielbark
  - 1st Legions Anti-Aircraft Regiment, in Ostrołęka
    - Command Battery, in Ostrołęka
    - 1st Legions Anti-Aircraft Group, in Ostrołęka
  - 3rd Legions Engineer Regiment, in Chełmno
    - Command Company, in Chełmno
    - Legions Engineer Battalion, in Chełmno
  - 1st Legions Logistic Regiment, in Mława
    - Command Company
    - Transport Battalion, in Czerwony Bór
  - 1st Legions Reconnaissance Battalion, in Białystok
  - 1st Legions Signal Battalion, in Ciechanów
  - 3rd Legions Chemical Battalion, in Brodnica
  - 1st Division Training Center, in Czerwony Bór
  - 2nd Division Training Center, in Ślubowo

=== 8th Home Army Infantry Division ===
- 8th Home Army Infantry Division "Romuald Traugutt", in Kielce
  - 8th Command Battalion, in Kielce (being formed)
  - Armored Brigade, in Mielec and Kolbuszowa (will activate by 2028)
  - Mechanized Brigade, in Łaziska (will activate by 2028)
  - Mechanized Brigade, in Raducz (will activate by 2028)
  - Motorized Brigade, in Leszno (will activate by 2028)
  - Artillery Brigade, in Dąbrówka (will activate by 2028)
  - Anti-Aircraft Regiment, in Gniewięcin (will activate by 2028)
  - Anti-tank Regiment, in Boleścice and Piołunka (will activate by 2028)
  - Logistic Regiment, in Januszewice (will activate by 2028)
  - 8th Reconnaissance Battalion, in Nowe Miasto nad Pilicą (being formed)

=== 11th Armored Cavalry Division ===
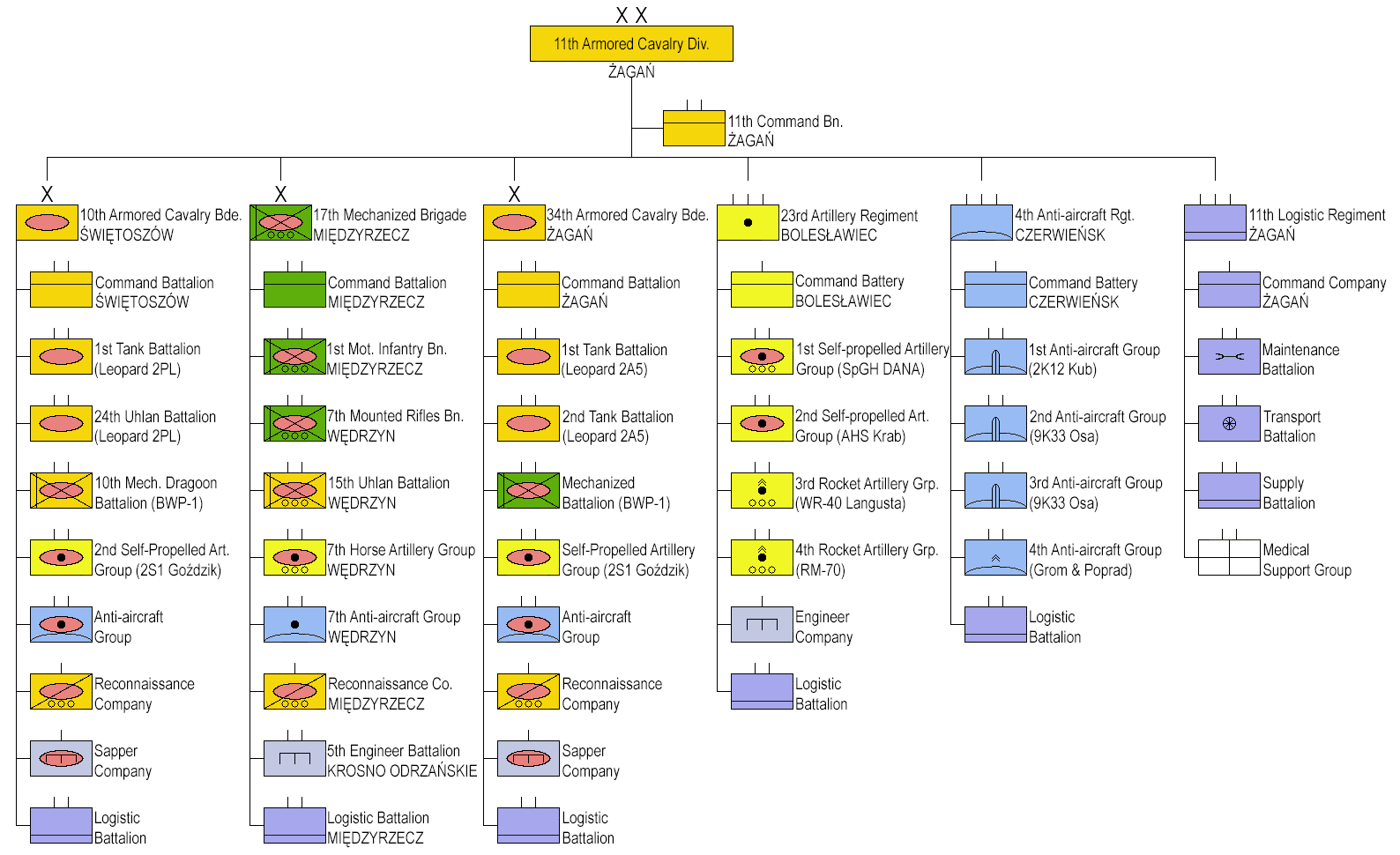
11th Armored Cavalry Division organisation 2025 (click image to enlarge)

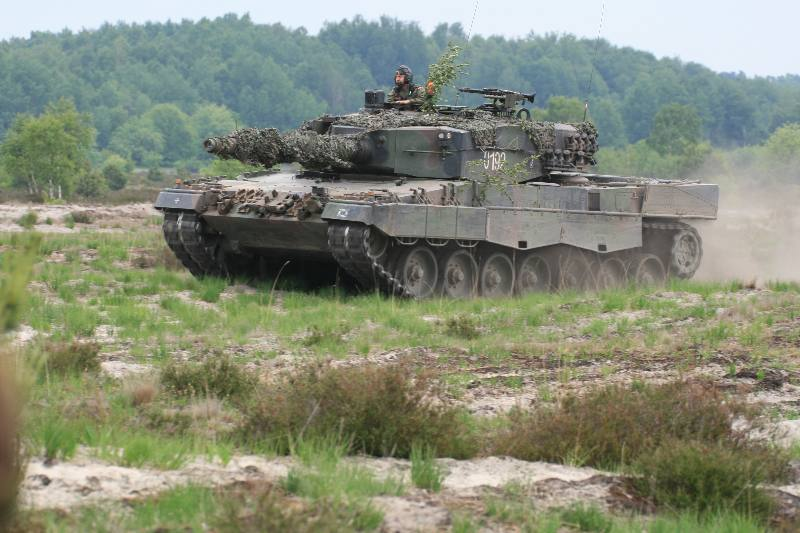
10th Armored Cavalry Brigade Leopard 2A4 on maneuver

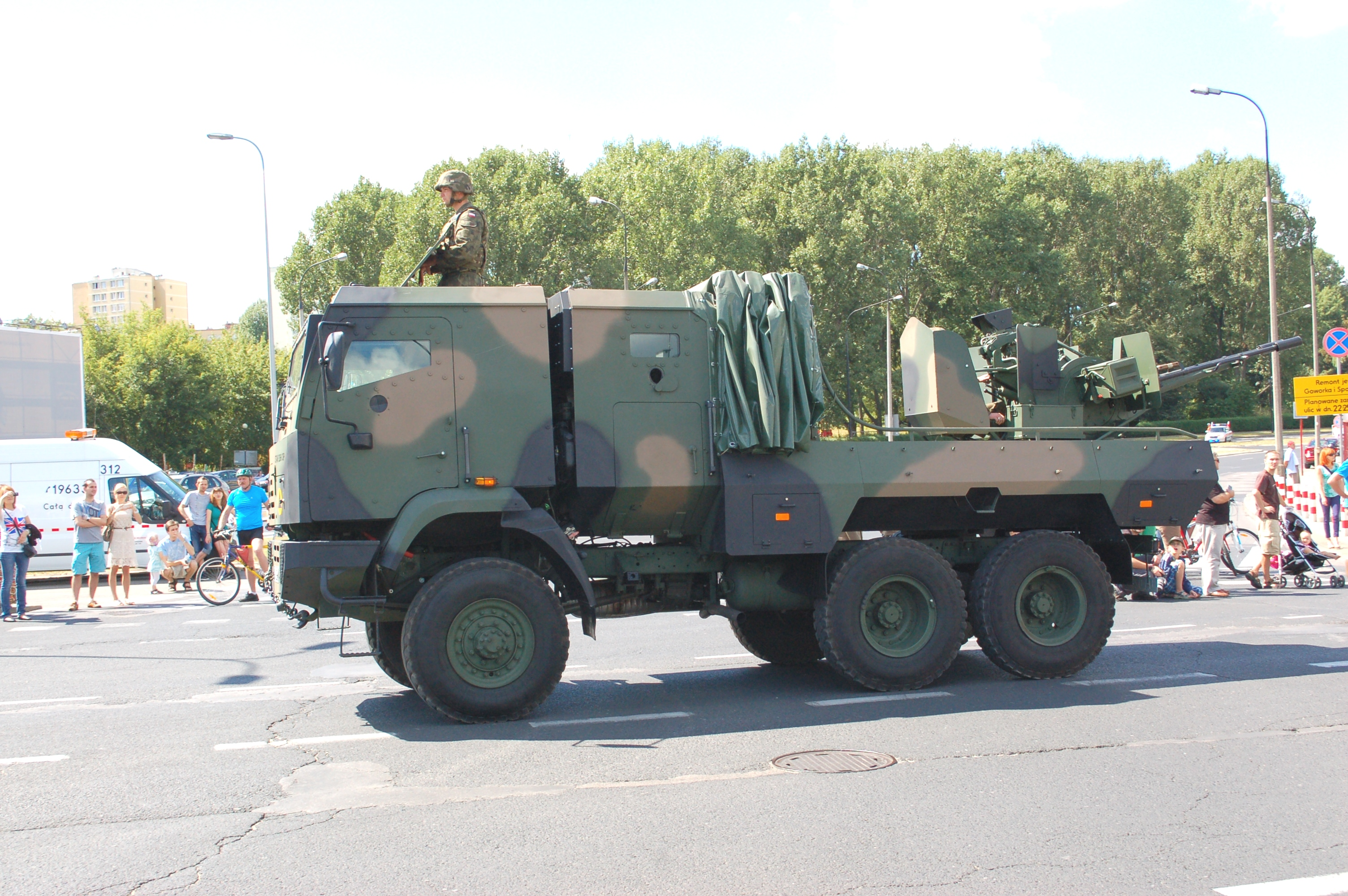
Hibneryt anti-aircraft system

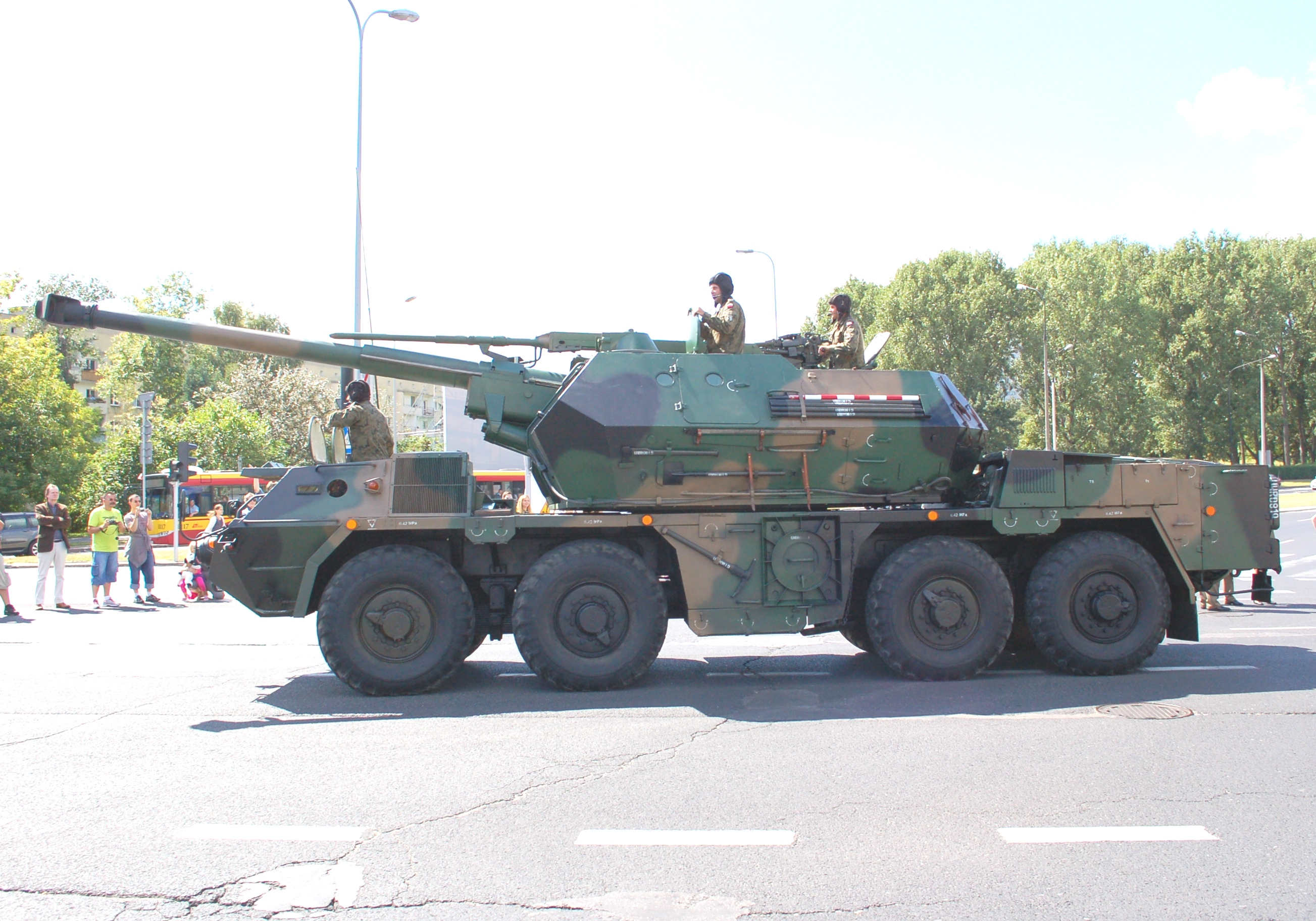
DANA 152 mm self-propelled howitzer

- 11th Lubusz Armored Cavalry Division "King Jan III Sobieski", in Żagań
  - 11th Command Battalion, in Żagań
  - 10th Armored Cavalry Brigade "Lt. Gen. Stanisław Maczek", in Świętoszów
    - Command Battalion
    - 1st Tank Battalion with Leopard 2PL main battle tanks
    - 24th Uhlan Battalion with Leopard 2PL main battle tanks
    - 10th Mechanized Dragoon Battalion with BWP-1 infantry fighting vehicles
    - Self-propelled Artillery Group with 2S1 Gvozdika 122 mm self-propelled howitzers
    - Anti-aircraft Group with ZSU-23-4MP Biała anti-aircraft systems and Grom surface-to-air missiles
    - 10th Reconnaissance Company with BRDM-2 vehicles
    - Sapper Company
    - Logistic Battalion
  - 17th Greater Poland Mechanized Brigade "Lt. Gen. Józef Dowbor-Muśnicki", in Międzyrzecz
    - Command Battalion, in Międzyrzecz
    - 1st Motorized Infantry Battalion "Rzeszów", in Międzyrzecz with KTO Rosomak infantry fighting vehicles
    - 7th Mounted Rifle Battalion "Wielkopolska"in Wędrzyn with KTO Rosomak infantry fighting vehicles
    - 15th Uhlan Battalion "Poznań", in Wedrzyn with KTO Rosomak infantry fighting vehicles
    - 7th Horse Artillery Group "Wielkopolska", in Wedrzyn with SpGH DANA 152 mm self-propelled howitzers
    - 7th Anti-aircraft Group, in Wedrzyn with Hibneryt anti-aircraft systems and Grom surface-to-air missiles
    - 5th Engineer Battalion, in Krosno Odrzańskie
    - Reconnaissance Company "Wielkopolska Uhlans", in Międzyrzecz
    - Logistic Battalion, in Międzyrzecz
  - 34th Armored Cavalry Brigade "Grand Crown Hetman Jan Zamoyski", in Żagań
    - Command Battalion
    - 1st Tank Battalion "Brabant" with Leopard 2A5 main battle tanks
    - 2nd Tank Battalion "Flanders" with Leopard 2A5 main battle tanks
    - Mechanized Battalion with BWP-1 infantry fighting vehicles
    - Self-propelled Artillery Group with 2S1 Gvozdika 122 mm self-propelled howitzers
    - Anti-aircraft Group "Dresden" with ZSU-23-4MP Biała anti-aircraft systems and Grom surface-to-air missiles
    - Reconnaissance Company with BRDM-2 vehicles
    - Sapper Company
    - Logistic Battalion
  - 23rd Silesian Artillery Regiment "Lt. Gen. Tadeusz Jordan-Rozwadowski", in Bolesławiec
    - Command Battery
    - 1st Self-propelled Artillery Group with SpGH DANA 152 mm self-propelled howitzers
    - 2nd Self-propelled Artillery Group with AHS Krab 155 mm self-propelled howitzers
    - 3rd Rocket Artillery Group with WR-40 Langusta multiple rocket launchers
    - 4th Rocket Artillery Group with RM-70 multiple rocket launchers
    - Logistic Battalion
    - Engineer Company
  - 4th Zielona Góra Anti-Aircraft Regiment "Maj. Gen. Stefan Rowecki", in Czerwieńsk
    - Command Battery, in Czerwieńsk
    - 1st Anti-Aircraft Group, in Leszno with 2K12 Kub surface-to-air missiles
    - 2nd Anti-Aircraft Group, in Czerwieńsk with 9K33 Osa surface-to-air missiles
    - 3rd Anti-Aircraft Group, in Czerwieńsk with 9K33 Osa surface-to-air missiles
    - 4th Anti-Aircraft Group, in Leszno with Grom and Poprad surface-to-air missiles
    - Logistic Battalion, in Czerwieńsk
  - 11th Logistic Regiment, in Żagań
    - Maintenance Battalion, in Żagań
    - Transport Battalion, in Żagań
    - Supply Battalion, in Żagań
    - Medical Support Group, in Żagań

=== 12th Mechanized Division ===
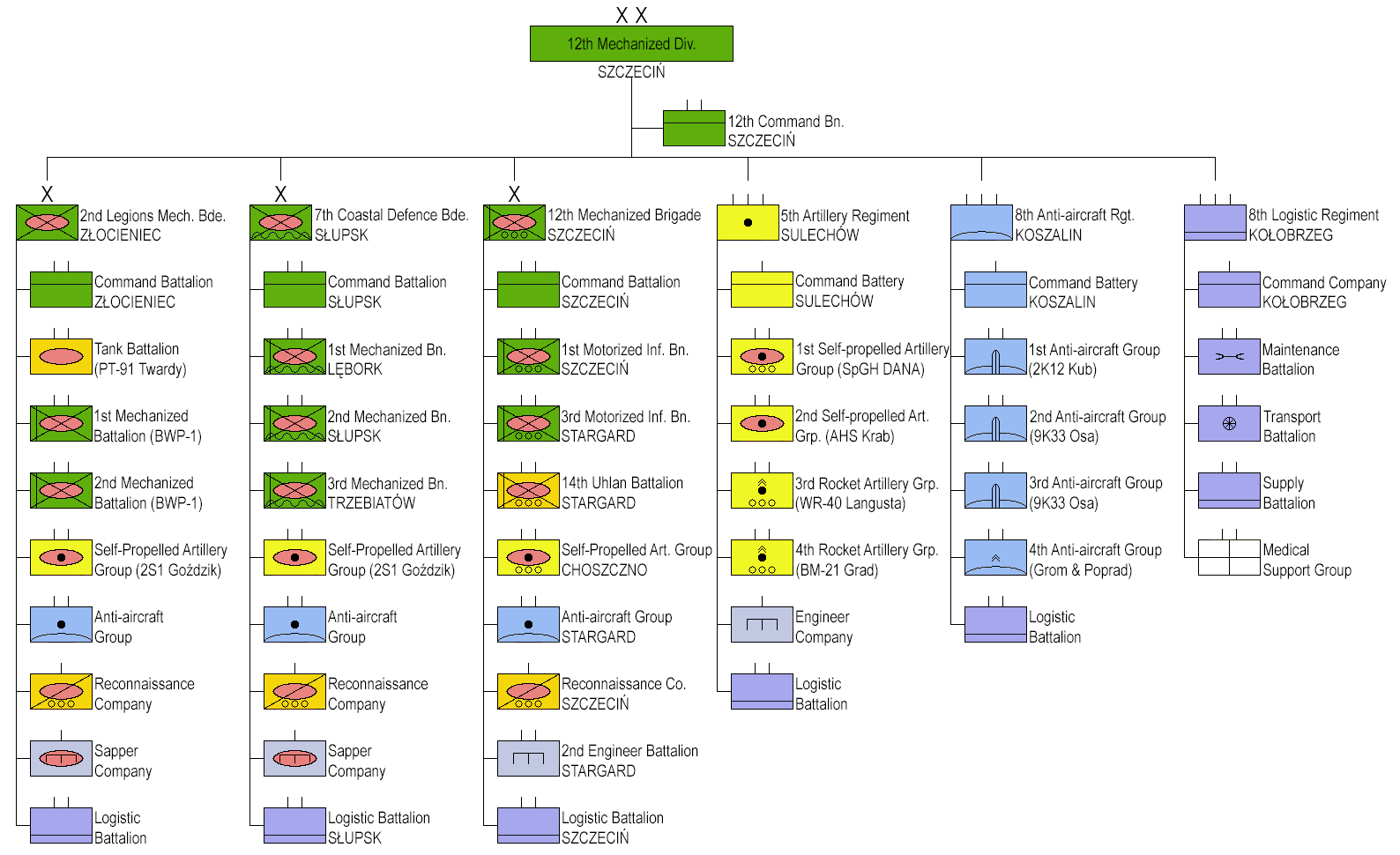
12th Mechanized Division organisation 2025 (click image to enlarge)

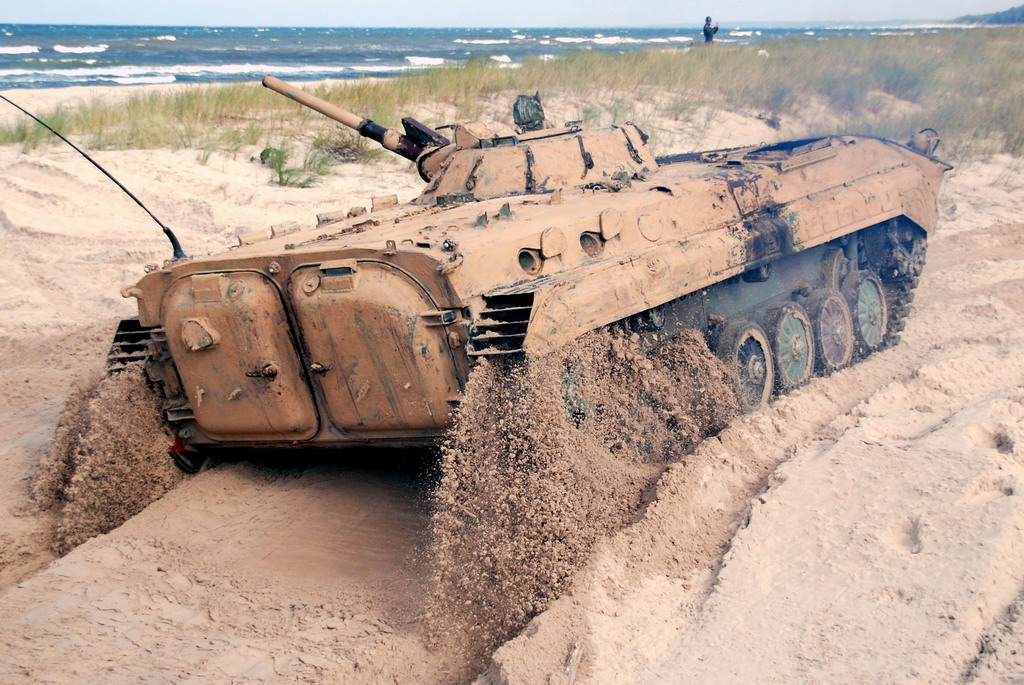
7th Coastal Defense Brigade BWP-1 on maneuver

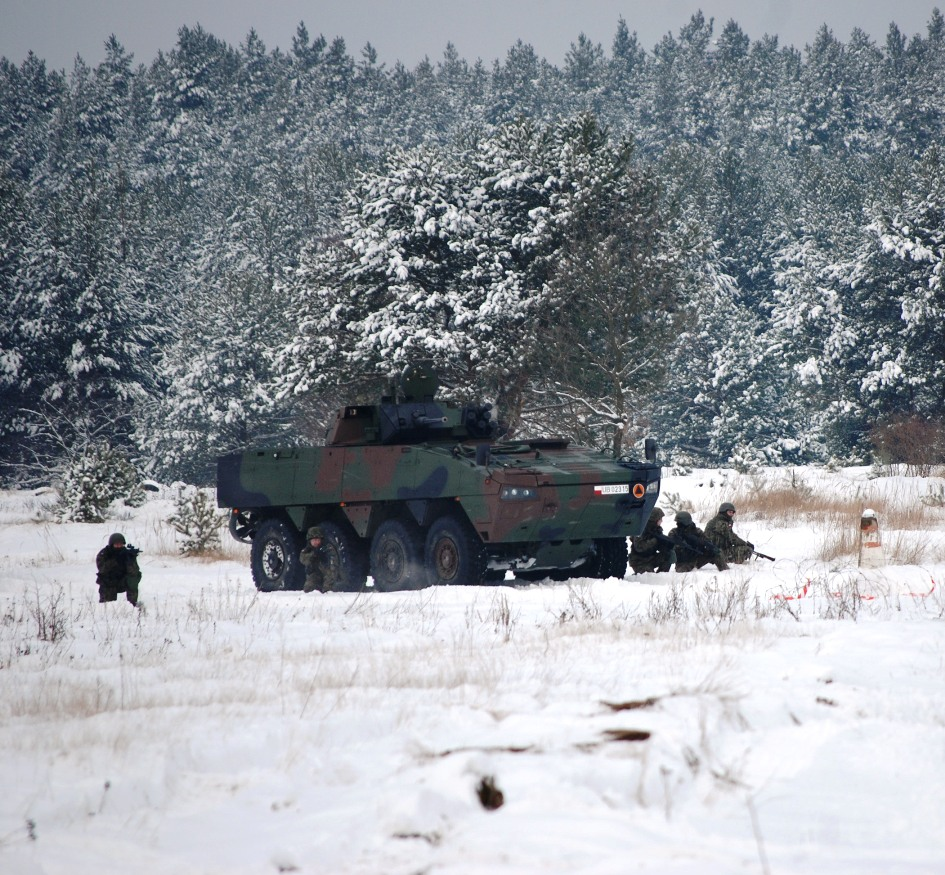
12th Mechanized Brigade with KTO Rosomak on winter maneuver

- 12th Szczecin Mechanized Division "Bolesław III Krzywousty", in Szczecin
  - 12th Command Battalion, in Szczecin
  - 2nd Legions Mechanized Brigade "Marshal Józef Piłsudski", in Złocieniec
    - Command Battalion
    - Tank Battalion with PT-91 Twardy main battle tanks
    - 1st Mechanized Battalion with BWP-1 infantry fighting vehicles
    - 2nd Mechanized Battalion with BWP-1 infantry fighting vehicles
    - Self-propelled Artillery Group with 2S1 Gvozdika 122 mm self-propelled howitzers
    - Anti-aircraft Group with Hibneryt anti-aircraft systems and Grom surface-to-air missiles
    - Reconnaissance Company with BRDM-2 vehicles
    - Sapper Company
    - Logistic Battalion
  - 7th Pomeranian Coastal Defense Brigade "Brig. Gen. Stanisław Grzmot-Skotnicki", in Słupsk
    - Command Battalion, in Słupsk
    - 1st Mechanized Battalion, in Lębork with BWP-1 infantry fighting vehicles
    - 2nd Mechanized Battalion, in Słupsk with BWP-1 infantry fighting vehicles
    - 3rd Academic Legion Mechanized Battalion, in Trzebiatów with BWP-1 infantry fighting vehicles
    - Artillery Group with 2S1 Gvozdika 122 mm self-propelled howitzers
    - Anti-aircraft Group with Hibneryt anti-aircraft systems and Grom surface-to-air missiles
    - Reconnaissance Company
    - Sapper Company
    - Logistic Battalion
  - 12th Mechanized Brigade "Lt. Gen. Józef Haller", in Szczecin
    - Command Battalion, in Szczecin
    - 1st Motorized Infantry Battalion, in Szczecin with KTO Rosomak infantry fighting vehicles
    - 3rd Motorized Infantry Battalion, in Stargard with KTO Rosomak infantry fighting vehicles
    - 14th Uhlan Battalion, in Stargard with KTO Rosomak infantry fighting vehicles
    - Self-propelled Artillery Group, in Choszczno with 24x SpGH DANA 152 mm self-propelled howitzers
    - Anti-aircraft Group, in Stargard with Hibneryt anti-aircraft systems and Grom surface-to-air missiles
    - 2nd Engineer Battalion, in Stargard
    - Reconnaissance Company, in Szczecin with BRDM-2 vehicles
    - Logistic Battalion, in Szczecin
  - 5th Lubusz Artillery Regiment "General of the Crown's Artillery Marcin Kątski", in Sulechów
    - Command Battery
    - 1st Self-propelled Artillery Group with SpGH DANA 152 mm self-propelled howitzers
    - 2nd Self-propelled Artillery Group with AHS Krab 155 mm self-propelled howitzers
    - 3rd Rocket Artillery Group with WR-40 Langusta multiple rocket launchers
    - 4th Rocket Artillery Group with BM-21 Grad multiple rocket launchers
    - Logistic Battalion
    - Engineer Company
  - 8th Koszalin Anti-Aircraft Regiment "Lt. Col. Kazimierz Angerman", in Koszalin
    - Command Battery
    - 1st Anti-Aircraft Group with 2K12 Kub surface-to-air missiles
    - 2nd Anti-Aircraft Group with 9K33 Osa surface-to-air missiles
    - 3rd Anti-Aircraft Group with 9K33 Osa surface-to-air missiles
    - 4th Anti-Aircraft Group with Grom and Poprad surface-to-air missiles
    - Logistic Battalion
  - 8th Logistic Regiment "Maj. Gen. Antoni Paweł Sułkowski", in Kołobrzeg
    - Maintenance Battalion, in Kołobrzeg
    - Transport Battalion, in Kołobrzeg
    - Supply Battalion, in Kołobrzeg
    - Medical Support Group, in Kołobrzeg

=== 16th Mechanized Division ===
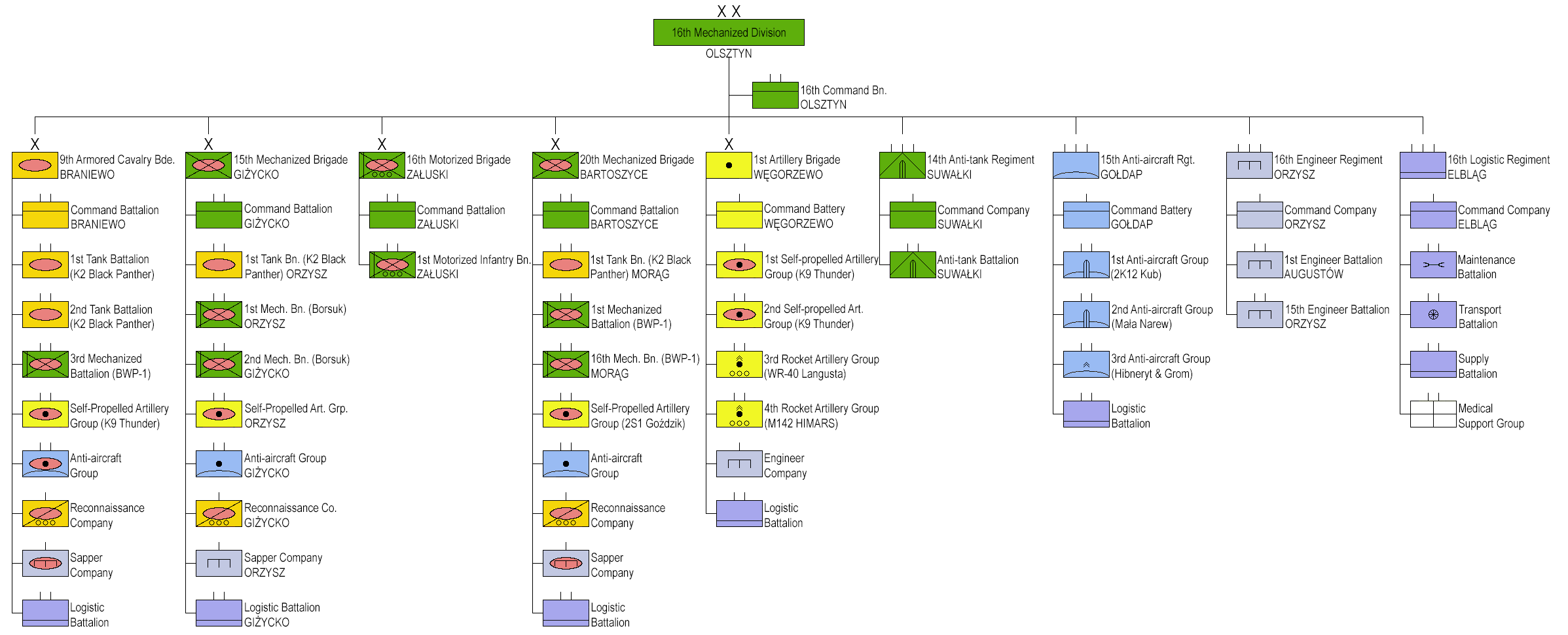
16th Mechanized Division organisation 2025 (click image to enlarge)

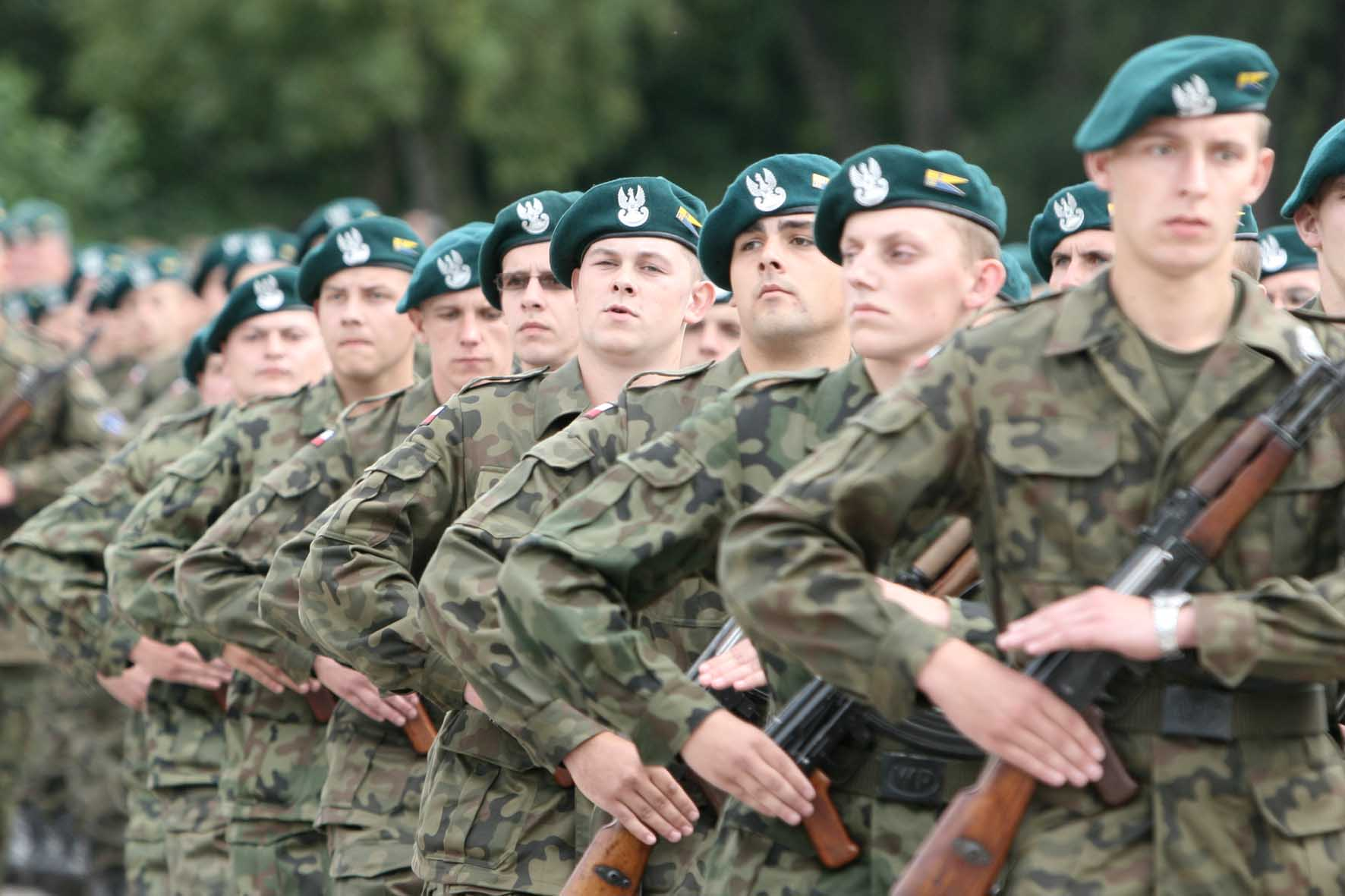
20th Mechanized Brigade troops on parade

- 16th Pomeranian Mechanized Division "King Casimir IV Jagiellon", in Olsztyn
  - 16th Command Battalion, in Olsztyn
  - 9th Braniewo Armored Cavalry Brigade "King Stefan Báthory", in Braniewo
    - Command Battalion
    - 1st Tank Battalion with K2 Black Panther main battle tanks
    - 2nd Tank Battalion with K2 Black Panther main battle tanks
    - 3rd Mechanized Battalion with BWP-1 infantry fighting vehicles (being replaced by Borsuk)
    - Self-propelled Artillery Group with K9 Thunder 155 mm self-propelled howitzers
    - Anti-aircraft Group with ZSU-23-4MP Biała anti-aircraft systems and Grom surface-to-air missiles
    - Reconnaissance Company with BRDM-2 vehicles
    - Sapper Company
    - Logistic Battalion
  - 15th Giżycko Mechanized Brigade "Zawisza Czarny", in Giżycko
    - Command Battalion, in Giżycko
    - 1st Tank Battalion, in Orzysz with K2 Black Panther main battle tanks
    - 1st Mechanized Battalion, in Orzysz with BWP-1 infantry fighting vehicles (being replaced by Borsuk)
    - 2nd Mechanized Battalion, in Giżycko with BWP-1 infantry fighting vehicles (being replaced by Borsuk)
    - Self-propelled Artillery Group, in Orzysz with 2S1 Gvozdika 122 mm self-propelled howitzers
    - Anti-aircraft Group, in Orzysz with ZUR-23-2 kg "Jodek-G" anti-aircraft systems and Grom surface-to-air missiles
    - Sapper Company, in Orzysz
    - Reconnaissance Company, in Giżycko with BRDM-2 vehicles
    - Logistic Battalion, in Giżycko
  - 16th Nidzica Motorized Brigade "Maj. Gen. Zygmunt Bohusz-Szyszko", in Załuski (formation commenced on 18 March 2024)
    - Command Battalion, in Załuski
    - 1st Motorized Infantry Battalion, in Załuski with KTO Rosomak infantry fighting vehicles
  - 20th Bartoszyce Mechanized Brigade "Lithuanian Hetman Wincenty Gosiewski", in Bartoszyce and Morąg
    - Command Battalion, in Bartoszyce
    - 1st Tank Battalion, in Morąg with K2 Black Panther main battle tanks
    - 1st Mechanized Battalion, in Bartoszyce with BWP-1 infantry fighting vehicles (being replaced by Borsuk)
    - 2nd Mechanized Battalion, in Morąg with BWP-1 infantry fighting vehicles (being replaced by Borsuk)
    - Self-propelled Artillery Group with 2S1 Gvozdika 122 mm self-propelled howitzers
    - Anti-aircraft Group with ZUR-23-2 kg "Jodek-G" anti-aircraft systems and Grom surface-to-air missiles
    - Reconnaissance Company with BRDM-2 vehicles
    - Sapper Company
    - Logistic Battalion
  - 1st Masuria Artillery Brigade "Gen. Józef Bem", in Węgorzewo
    - Command Battery
    - 1st Self-propelled Artillery Group with K9 Thunder 155 mm self-propelled howitzers
    - 2nd Self-propelled Artillery Group with K9 Thunder 155 mm self-propelled howitzers
    - 3rd Rocket Artillery Group with WR-40 Langusta multiple rocket launchers
    - 4th Rocket Artillery Group with M142 HIMARS multiple rocket launchers
    - Engineer Company
    - Logistic Battalion
  - 14th Suwałki Anti-tank Regiment "Józef Piłsudski", in Suwałki (being formed)
    - Command Company, in Suwałki
    - Anti-tank Battalion, in Suwałki
  - 15th Gołdap Anti-Aircraft Regiment, in Gołdap
    - Command Battery
    - 1st Anti-Aircraft Group with 2K12 Kub surface-to-air missiles
    - 2nd Anti-Aircraft Group, in Elbląg with Mała Narew
    - 3rd Anti-Aircraft Group with Hibneryt anti-aircraft systems and Grom surface-to-air missiles
    - Logistic Battalion
  - 16th Engineer Regiment, in Orzysz
    - Command Company, in Orzysz
    - 1st Engineer Battalion, in Augustów
    - 15th Engineer Battalion, in Orzysz
  - 16th Żuławy Logistic Regiment, in Elbląg
    - Maintenance Battalion, in Elbląg
    - Transport Battalion, in Elbląg
    - Supply Battalion, in Elbląg
    - Medical Support Group, in Elbląg

=== 18th Mechanized Division ===
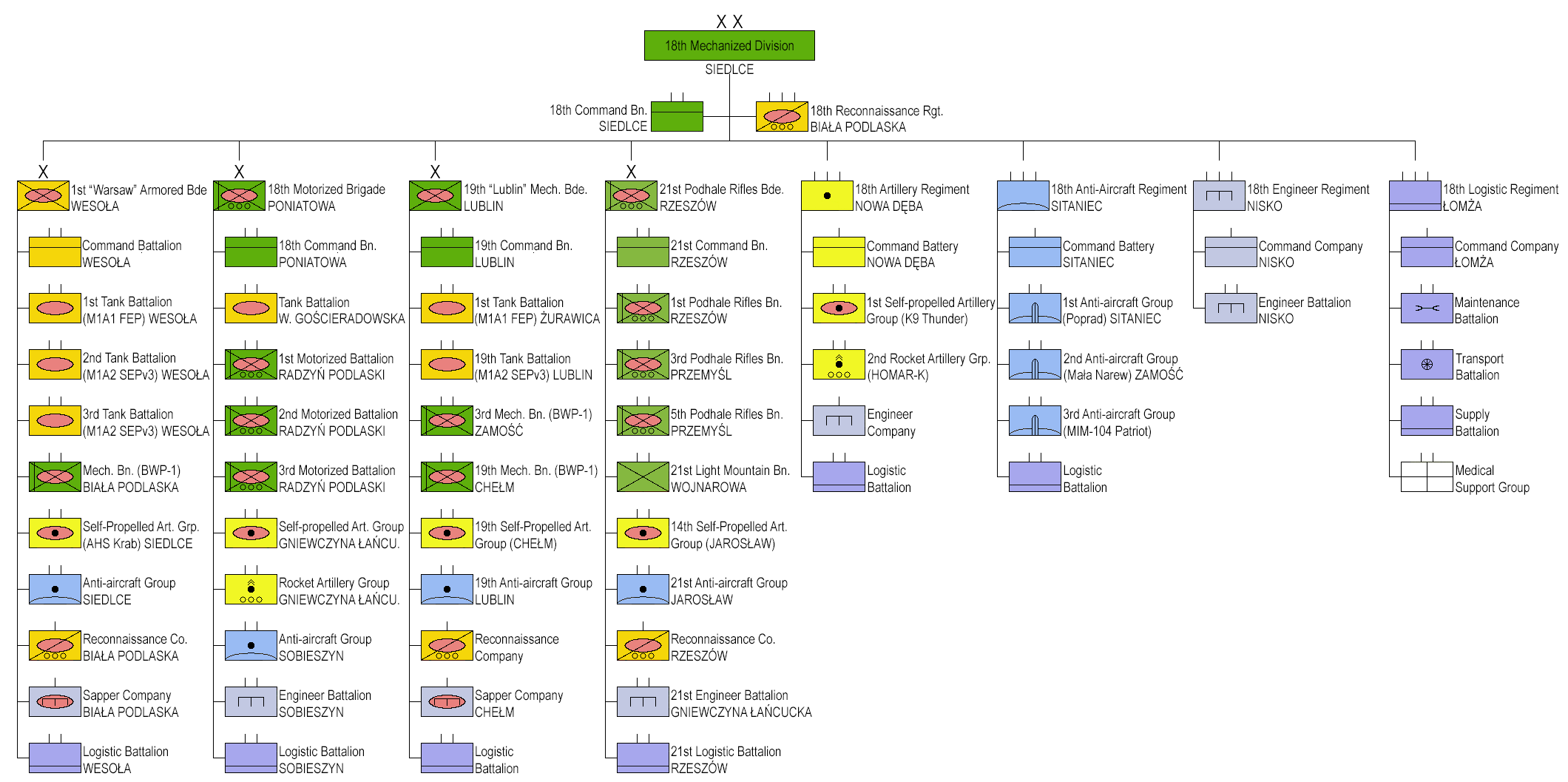
18th Mechanized Division organisation 2025 (click image to enlarge)

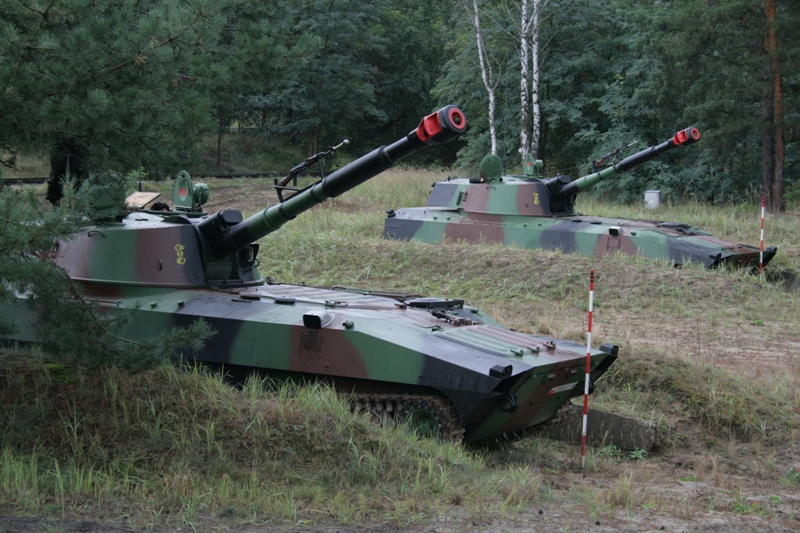
2S1 Gvozdika artillery of 1st Armored Brigade

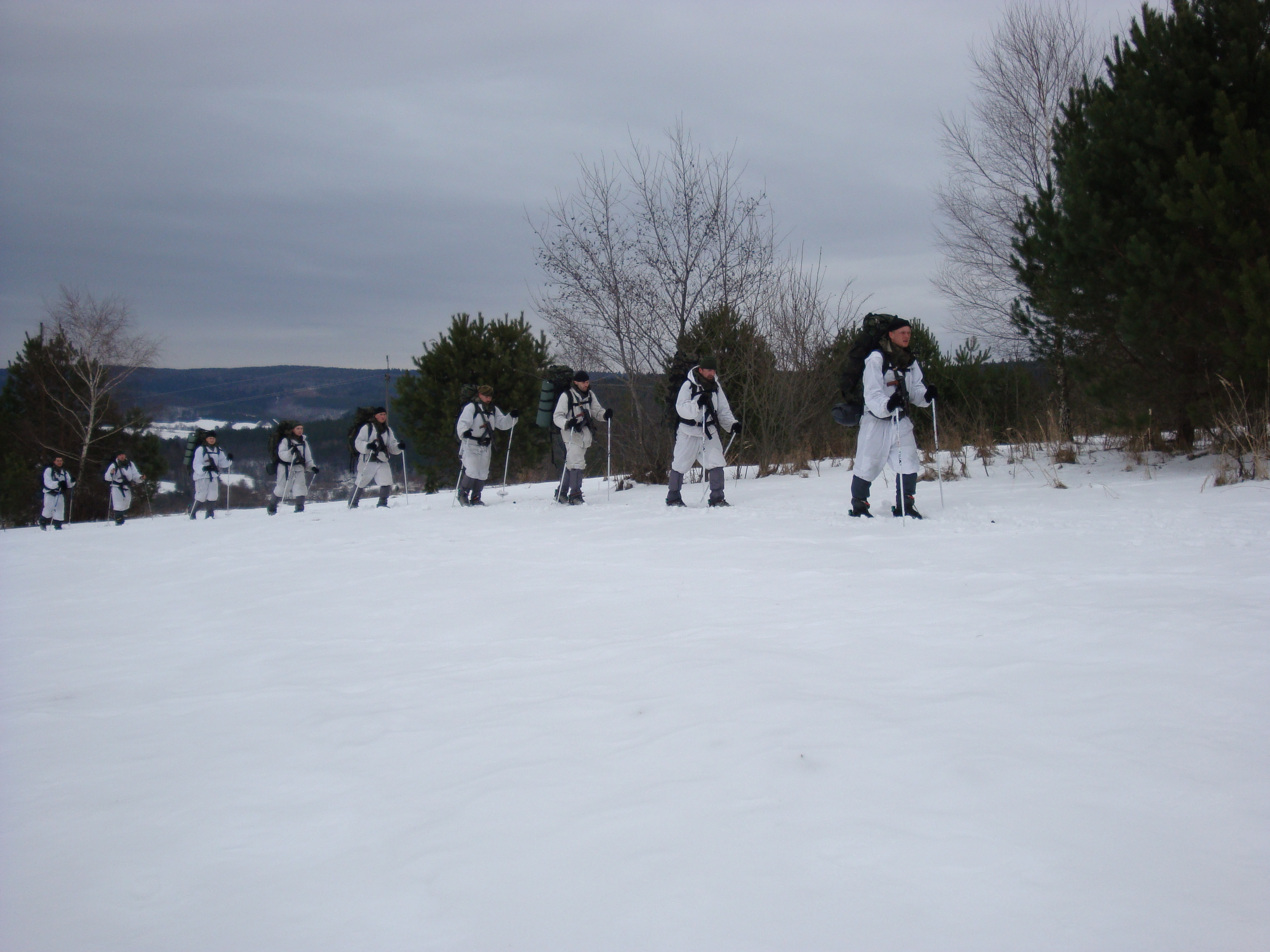
21st Podhale Rifles brigade on maneuver

- 18th Mechanized Division "Lt. Gen. Tadeusz Buk", in Siedlce
  - 18th Command Battalion, in Siedlce
  - 1st Warsaw Armored Brigade "Tadeusz Kościuszko", in Wesoła
    - Command Battalion, in Wesoła
    - 1st Tank Battalion, in Wesoła with M1A1 FEP Abrams main battle tanks
    - 2nd Tank Battalion, in Wesoła with M1A2 SEPv3 Abrams main battle tanks
    - 3rd Tank Battalion, in Wesoła with M1A2 SEPv3 Abrams main battle tanks
    - Mechanized Battalion, in Biała Podlaska with BWP-1 infantry fighting vehicles
    - Self-propelled Artillery Group, in Siedlce with AHS Krab 155 mm self-propelled howitzers
    - Anti-aircraft Group, in Siedlce with ZUR-23-2 kg "Jodek-G" anti-aircraft systems and Grom surface-to-air missiles
    - Reconnaissance Company, in Biała Podlaska with BRDM-2 vehicles
    - Sapper Company, in Biała Podlaska
    - Logistic Battalion, in Wesoła
  - 18th Motorized Brigade, in Poniatowa (activated on 3 October 2023)
    - 18th Command Battalion, in Poniatowa
    - Tank Battalion, in Wólka Gościeradowska
    - 3× Motorized battalions, in Radzyń Podlaski
    - Self-propelled Artillery Group, in Gniewczyna Łańcucka
    - Rocket Artillery Group, in Gniewczyna Łańcucka
    - Anti-aircraft Group, in Sobieszyn
    - Engineer Battalion, in Sobieszyn
    - Logistic Battalion, in Sobieszyn
  - 19th Lublin Mechanized Brigade "Maj. Gen. Franciszek Kleeberg", in Lublin
    - 19th Command Battalion, in Lublin
    - 1st Tank Battalion, in Żurawica with M1A1 FEP Abrams main battle tanks
    - 19th Tank Battalion, in Lublin with M1A2 SEPv3 Abrams main battle tanks
    - 3rd Mechanized Battalion, in Zamość with BWP-1 infantry fighting vehicles
    - 19th Mechanized Battalion, in Chełm with BWP-1 infantry fighting vehicles
    - 19th Self-propelled Artillery Group, in Chełm with K9 Thunder 155 mm self-propelled howitzers
    - 19th Anti-aircraft Group, in Lublin with ZUR-23-2 kg "Jodek-G" anti-aircraft systems and Grom surface-to-air missiles
    - Reconnaissance Company, with BRDM-2 vehicles
    - Sapper Company, in Chełm
    - Logistic Battalion
  - 21st Podhale Rifles Brigade "Brig. Gen Mieczysław Boruta-Spiechowicz", in Rzeszów
    - 21st Command Battalion, in Rzeszów
    - 1st Podhale Rifles Battalion, in Rzeszow with KTO Rosomak infantry fighting vehicles
    - 3rd Podhale Rifles Battalion, in Przemyśl with BWP-1 infantry fighting vehicles (being replaced by KTO Rosomak)
    - 5th Podhale Rifles Battalion, in Przemyśl with BWP-1 infantry fighting vehicles (being replaced by KTO Rosomak)
    - 21st Light Mountain Battalion, in Wojnarowa
    - 14th Self-propelled Artillery Group, in Jarosław with K9 Thunder 155 mm self-propelled howitzers
    - 21st Anti-aircraft Group, in Jarosław with Hibneryt anti-aircraft systems and Grom surface-to-air missiles
    - 21st Engineer Battalion, in Gniewczyna Łańcucka
    - 21st Logistic Battalion, in Rzeszów
  - 18th Artillery Brigade "Col. Witold Sztark", in Nowa Dęba
    - Command Battery
    - 1st Self-propelled Artillery Group with K9 Thunder 155 mm self-propelled howitzers
    - 3rd Rocket Artillery Group with Homar-K multiple rocket launchers
    - Engineer Company
    - Logistic Battalion
  - 18th Reconnaissance Regiment, in Biała Podlaska (being formed)
  - 18th Anti-Aircraft Regiment, in Sitaniec
    - Command Battery
    - 1st Anti-aircraft Group, in Sitaniec with Poprad self-propelled surface-air-missile system
    - 2nd Anti-aircraft Group, in Zamość with Mała Narew surface-air-missile system
    - 3rd Anti-aircraft Group with MIM-104 Patriot surface-air-missile system
    - Logistic Battalion
  - 18th Engineer Regiment, in Nisko
    - Command Company, in Nisko
    - Engineer Battalion, in Nisko
  - 18th Logistic Regiment, in Łomża
    - Maintenance Battalion, in Łomża
    - Transport Battalion, in Łomża
    - Supply Battalion, in Łomża
    - Medical Support Group, in Łomża

=== 1st Army Aviation Brigade ===
- 1st Army Aviation Brigade, in Inowrocław
  - 49th Air Base, in Pruszcz Gdański
    - 1st Squadron with 12x Mi-24W attack helicopters (to be replaced by AH-64E Apache attack helicopters)
    - 2nd Squadron with 12x Mi-2URP attack helicopters (to be replaced by AH-64E Apache attack helicopters)
    - 3rd Squadron with 16x Mi-2 NVG training helicopters
  - 56th Air Base, in Inowrocław
    - 1st Squadron with 12x Mi-24W attack helicopters (to be replaced by AH-64E Apache attack helicopters)
    - 2nd Squadron with 12x Mi-2URP attack helicopters (to be replaced by AH-64E Apache attack helicopters)
    - 3rd Squadron with 8x PZL W-3PL Głuszec combat search and rescue helicopters
    - Training Squadron with 8x AH-64D Apache attack helicopters
  - Air Reconnaissance Squadron, in Mirosławiec with 45x Orbiter unmanned aerial vehicles

=== 6th Airborne Brigade ===
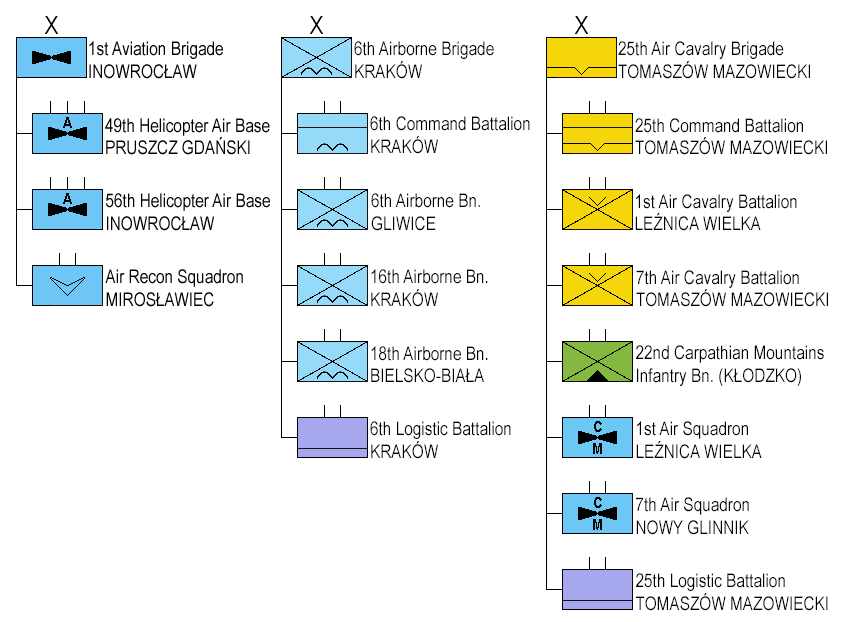
Independent brigades organisation 2025 (click image to enlarge)

- 6th Airborne Brigade "Brig. Gen. Stanisław Sosabowski", in Kraków
  - 6th Command Battalion, in Kraków
  - 6th Airborne Battalion, in Gliwice
  - 16th Airborne Battalion, in Kraków
  - 18th Airborne Battalion, in Bielsko-Biała
  - 6th Logistic Battalion, in Kraków

=== 25th Air Cavalry Brigade ===
- 25th Air Cavalry Brigade "Prince Józef Poniatowski", in Tomaszów Mazowiecki
  - 25th Command Battalion, in Tomaszów Mazowiecki
  - 1st Air Cavalry Battalion, in Leźnica Wielka
  - 7th Air Cavalry Battalion, in Tomaszów Mazowiecki
  - 22nd Carpathian Mountains Infantry Battalion, in Kłodzko
  - 1st Aviation Group, in Leźnica Wielka
    - 1st Squadron with 16x Mi-8T transport helicopters (planned to be replaced with AW101 helicopters)
    - 2nd Squadron with 16x Mi-17-1V transport helicopters (planned to be replaced with AW101 helicopters)
  - 7th Aviation Group, in Nowy Glinnik
    - 1st Squadron with 12x PZL W-3WA Sokół helicopters (being replaced by AW149 helicopters)
    - 2nd Squadron with 12x PZL W-3WA Sokół helicopters (being replaced by AW149 helicopters)
  - Air Medical Evacuation Unit, in Nowy Glinnik with 2x PZL W-3WA AE Sokół and 2x Mi-17AE medical evacuation helicopters
  - 25th Logistic Battalion, in Tomaszów Mazowiecki

=== Directly reporting regiments ===
- 2nd Hrubieszów Reconnaissance Regiment "Maj. Henryk Dobrzański „Hubal”", in Hrubieszów
  - Command Company
  - 3× Long-range reconnaissance companies
  - 3× Reconnaissance companies
  - Logistic Company
- 9th Warmiński Reconnaissance Regiment "Col. Zygmunt Szendzielarz „Łupaszka”", in Lidzbark Warmiński
  - Command Company
  - 3× Long-range reconnaissance companies
  - 3× Reconnaissance companies
  - Logistic Company
- 18th Białystok Reconnaissance Regiment (unofficially "Carpathian Uhlans"), in Białystok
  - Command Company
  - 3× Long-range reconnaissance companies
  - 3× Reconnaissance companies
  - Logistic Company
- 1st Brzeg Engineer Regiment "Tadeusz Kościuszko", in Brzeg
  - Command Company
  - 1st Engineer Battalion
  - 2nd Engineer Battalion
  - Logistic Battalion
- 2nd Mazovian Engineer Regiment, in Nowy Dwór Mazowiecki
  - Command Company, in Nowy Dwór Mazowiecki
  - 1st Engineer Battalion, in Kazuń Nowy
  - 2nd Engineer Battalion, in Kazuń Nowy
  - Logistic Battalion, in Kazuń Nowy
- 2nd Inowrocław Engineer Regiment "Gen. Jakub Jasiński", in Inowrocław
  - Command Company, in Inowrocław
  - 1st Bridging Battalion, in Dęblin
  - 4th Engineer Battalion, in Głogów
  - Logistic Battalion, in Inowrocław
- 5th Engineer Regiment "Gen. Ignacy Prądzyński", in Szczecin
  - Command Company, in Szczecin
  - 1st Engineer Battalion, in Szczecin
  - 2nd Engineer Battalion, in Szczecin
  - Logistic Battalion, in Szczecin
- 4th Brodnica Chemical Regiment "Ignacy Mościcki", in Brodnica (CBRN defense)
  - Command Company
    - 1st Chemical Battalion, in Brodnica
      - Command Platoon
      - 3× Chemical companies
      - Logistic Company
    - 6th Chemical Battalion, in Śrem
      - Command Platoon
      - 3× Chemical companies
      - Logistic Company
  - Logistic Company
- 5th CBRN defense Regiment "Lt. Gen. Leon Berbecki", in Tarnowskie Góry
  - Command Company
    - 1st Chemical Battalion
      - Command Platoon
      - 3× Chemical companies
      - Logistic Company
    - 2nd Chemical Battalion
      - Command Platoon
      - 3× Chemical companies
      - Logistic Company
  - Logistic Company
- 2nd Przasnysz Radio-Electronic Reconnaissance Regiment, in Przasnysz
  - 8th Grudziądz Radio-Electronic Combat Bataillon "Brigadier General Zygmunt Podhorski", in Grudziądz
- Central Psychological Operations Group "King Stefan Báthory", in Bydgoszcz

== Units and Formations attached to the Land Forces ==
=== Armed Forces Support Inspectorate ===
- 1st Pomeranian Logistic Brigade "Casimir the Great", in Bydgoszcz
  - 1st Command and Security Battalion, in Bydgoszcz
  - 1st Storage Battalion, in Ciechanów
  - 1st Logistic Battalion, in Bydgoszcz
  - 2nd Logistic Battalion, in Bydgoszcz
  - 3rd Logistic Battalion, in Glewice
  - 11th Transport Battalion, in Czarne
  - 52nd Maintenance Battalion, in Czarne
  - 112th Maintenance Battalion, in Giżycko
- 10th Opole Logistic Brigade "Col. Piotr Wysocki", in Opole
  - 10th Command and Security Battalion, in Opole
  - 1st Logistic Battalion, in Opole
  - 2nd Logistic Battalion, in Opole
  - 10th Storage Battalion, in Opole
  - 55th Maintenance Battalion, in Opole
  - 82nd Transport Battalion, in Oleśnica
  - 91st Logistic Battalion, in Komprachcice
  - National Support Component Headquarter, in Opole
  - Medical Support Group, in Opole

=== Military Health Service Department ===
- 1st Military Field Hospital, in Bydgoszcz
- 2nd Military Field Hospital, in Wrocław
  - 6th Medical Group, in Kraków
  - 10th Medical Support Group, in Świętoszów
  - 25th Medical Security Group, in Tomaszów Mazowiecki

== Selected Land Forces elements, Armed Forces Operational Command ==
=== Multinational Corps North-East ===
- Multinational Corps Northeast (MNC NE), in Szczecin, Polish Element
  - MNC NE Support Brigade, in Stargard
    - Brigade Command Company, in Stargard
    - 100th Signal Battalion, in Wałcz
    - 104th Support Battalion, in Wałcz
    - Force Protection Company, in Szczecin (will expand to 102nd Force Protection Battalion, in case of war)
    - Polish National Support Element, in Szczecin

=== Lithuanian–Polish–Ukrainian Brigade ===
- LITPOLUKRBRIG, in Lublin
  - LITPOLUKRBRIG Command Battalion, in Lublin

== Independent units and formations ==
=== 9th Command Support Brigade of the Armed Forces General Command ===
The brigade is made up mostly of Land Forces personnel, but it is independent from the LF.

- 9th Command Support Brigade of the Armed Forces General Command, in Białobrzegi
  - 5th Command Battalion "Maj. Gen. Stanisław Haller", in Kraków
  - Land Forces Command Battalion "2nd Lt. Stefan Szuby", in Białobrzegi
  - 6th Air Forces Command Battalion, in Śrem
  - Naval Command Battalion "Col. Kazimierz Pruszkowski" Wejherowo
  - Lublin Command Battalion "Romuald Traugutt" of the LITPOLUKRBRIG Multinational Brigade, in Lublin
  - Command Systems Support Center of the Armed Forces General Command, in Białobrzegi

=== Warsaw Garrison Command ===
The command is an independent formation made up mostly of Land Forces personnel.

- Warsaw Garrison Command, in Warsaw
  - 15th Sieradz Command Support Brigade, in Sieradz
    - Brigade HQ
    - 1.Command Battalion
    - 1. Signals Battalion
  - 10th Wrocław Command Regiment, in Wrocław
    - 1. Średzki Command Battalion
    - 2. Wołowski Command Battalion
    - 3. Strzegocin Batalion Dowodzenia
    - Jawor Logistical Battalion
  - Security Regiment "Maj. Gen. Bolesław Wieniawa-Długoszowski", in Warsaw
    - 1. Security Battalion
    - 2. Security Battalion
    - Supply Battalion
  - Representative Honor Guard Regiment of the Polish Armed Forces (honor guard), in Warsaw
    - Regimental HQ
    - 1st Guards Battalion
      - Battalion HQ Company
      - 1 Honor Guard Company
      - 2 Honor Guard Company
      - 3 Honor Guard Company
    - Support Unit
      - Representative Central Band of the Polish Armed Forces
      - State Honors Artillery Platoon
      - Security Staff
      - Presidential Horse Guard Mounted Ceremonial Squadron
  - 10th Warsaw Automobile Regiment "Maj. Stefan Bronisław Starzyński", in Warsaw
    - Regiment HQ
    - 1. Transport Battalion
    - 2. Transport Battalion
    - Logistical Battalion
  - Supply Department Warsaw
  - Capitol Garrison Supply Department, in Warsaw
  - Warsaw Garrison Command Supply Department, in Warsaw
  - Military Physical Training and Conditional Center, in Mrągowo
  - 24. Field Technical Base of the Signals Troops, in Szumirad
  - Land Forces Band, in Wrocław
  - Air Forces Band, in Poznań
  - Representative Band of the Navy, in Gdynia
  - 15 military band stationed within military garrisons, in Bydgoszcz, Elbląg, Giżycko, Dęblin, Bytom, Żagań, Świnoujście, Lublin, Siedlce, Kraków, Toruń, Koszalin, Radom, Rzeszów and Szczecin
  - Special Editions Printing Press of the General Staff, in Warsaw
  - Warsaw Garrison Command Club, in Warsaw

== Land Forces structure graphic ==
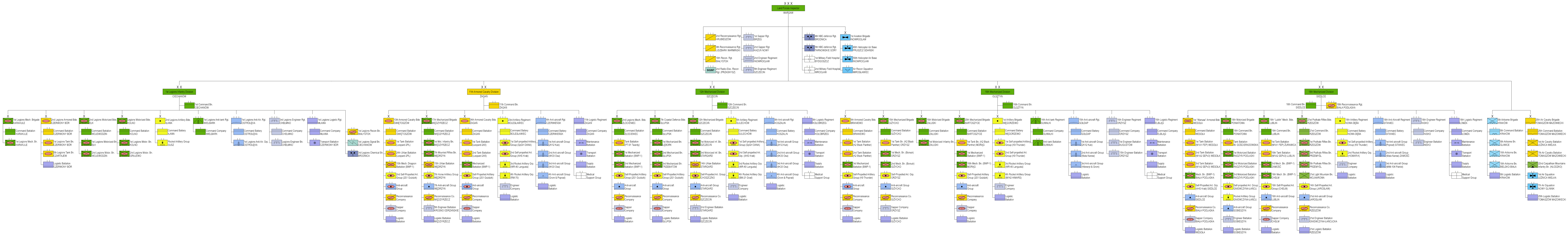
Polish Land Forces organisation 2025 (click to enlarge)
