= ZSU =

ZSU may refer to:

- Armed Forces of Ukraine (Ukrainian: Збройні сили України, romanized: Zbroini syly Ukrainy)
- Self-propelled anti-aircraft weapon (Russian: зенитная самоходная установка, romanized: zenitnaya samokhodnaya ustanovka)
  - ZSU-37, based on the chassis of the SU-76M and developed by the end of 1943
  - ZSU-57-2, developed by the 1950s, twin 57mm autocannon
  - ZSU-23-4, successor of the ZSU-57-2, four barrel 23mm autocannon
  - ZSU-23-4MP Biała, Polish modification of the ZSU-23-4
- Sun Yat-sen University (Zhong Shan University, in Chinese)
- Z Special Unit, a World War II unit
