= 7th Coastal Defense Brigade =

7th Pomeranian Coastal Defence Brigade
- 7 Pomorska Brygada Obrony Wybrzeża
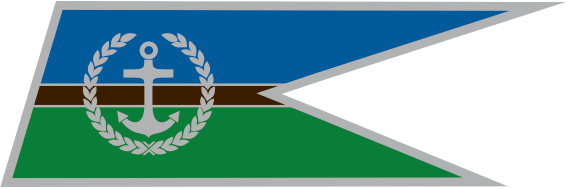
- Beret flash
- Active: 2001–present
- Country: Poland
- Branch: Polish Land Forces
- Type: Mechanized infantry
- Size: Brigade
- Part of: 12th Mechanised Division "Szczecin"
- Garrison/HQ: Słupsk
- Website: 7bow.wp.mil.pl

The 7th Pomeranian Coastal Defence Brigade (Polish: 7 Pomorska Brygada Obrony Wybrzeża (7 PBOW)) is a mechanized infantry brigade of the Polish Land Forces (based at Słupsk).

== History ==
It was formed in 2001 from the 7th Pomeranian Mechanized Brigade (of the 8th Coastal Defence Division). Now it is a brigade of the 12th Mechanized Division based at Szczecin. It bears traditions of the disbanded 7th Sea Landing Division (known as the Blue Berets), previously themselves the 23rd Landing Division (pl:23 Dywizja Desantowa) from 1958 to 1963, therefore it is sometimes referred to the marines of Poland, modeled after the French Troupes de marine of the French Army. The 7th Sea Landing Division was reportedly involved in internal security tasks during the disturbances of 1981–82, according to contemporary NATO assessments.

However, as of 2007 there are no plans by the Polish Land Forces to create an active marine unit. Therefore, the 7th Brigade carries out only limited-scale exercises of amphibious assaults.

The brigade is also the de facto successor of the 1st and 2nd Marine Rifle Regiments that were formed for the 1939 Nazi invasion of Poland.

== Structure ==
It consists of the following subunits:

- 7th Coastal Defense Brigade in Słupsk
  - Command Battalion in Słupsk
  - 1st Mechanised Battalion in Lębork with BMP-1 infantry fighting vehicles
  - 2nd Mechanised Battalion in Słupsk with BMP-1 infantry fighting vehicles
  - 3rd "Academic Legion" Mechanised Battalion in Trzebiatów with BMP-1 infantry fighting vehicles
  - Artillery Group with 2S1 Gvozdika 122mm self-propelled howitzers
  - Anti-aircraft Group with Hibneryt anti-aircraft systems and Grom surface-to-air missiles
  - Reconnaissance Company
  - Engineer Company
  - Logistic Battalion
