= 18th Reconnaissance Regiment (Poland) =

- 18 Pułk Rozpoznawczy
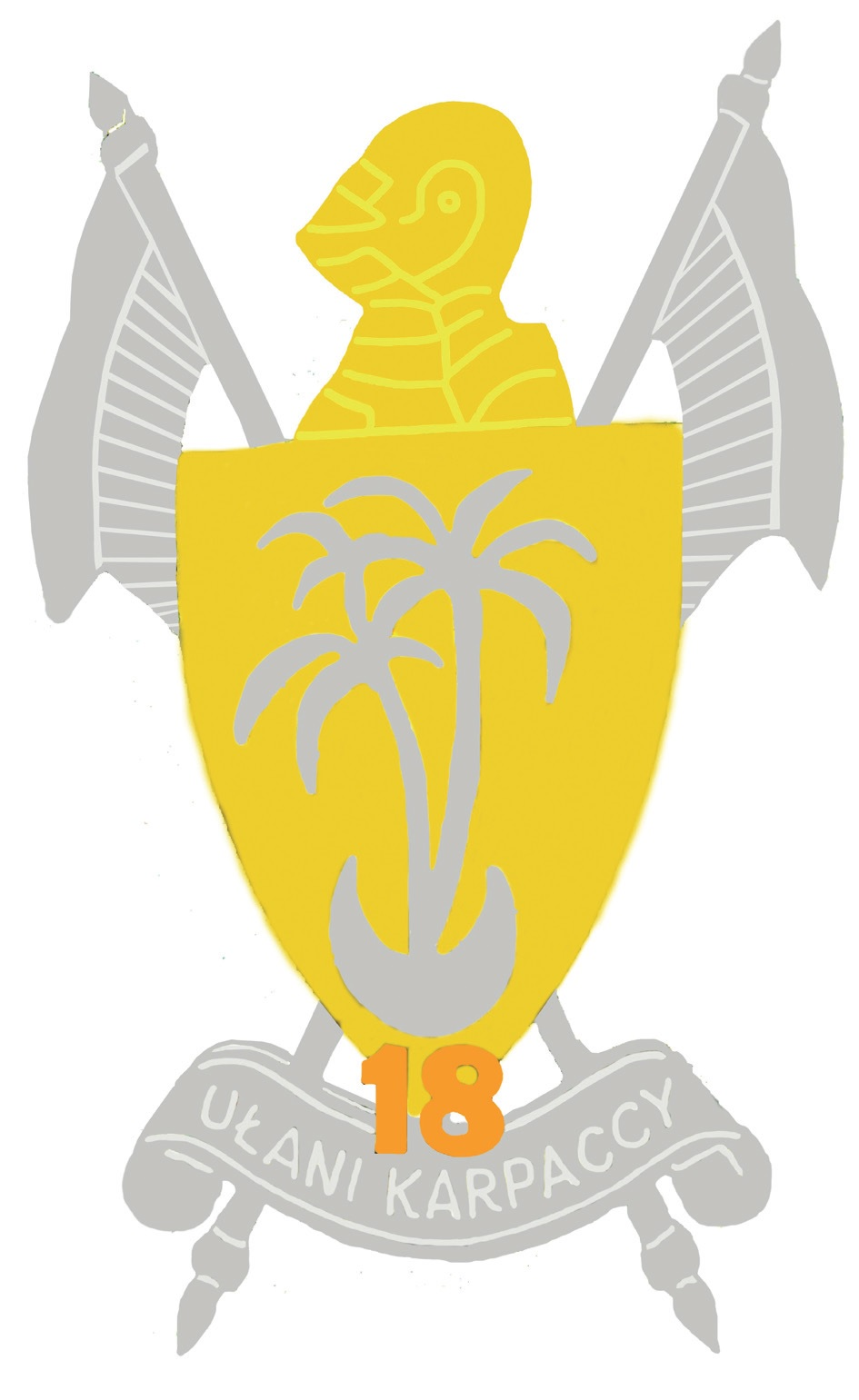
- Distinctive unit insignia
- Active: 1 July 2009 – present
- Country: Poland
- Allegiance: Polish Land Forces
- Branch: Land Forces
- Role: Reconnaissance
- Garrison/HQ: Białystok
- Website: https://18pr.wp.mil.pl/

Commanders
- Pułkownik dypl.: Wieslaw Podlecki

Insignia
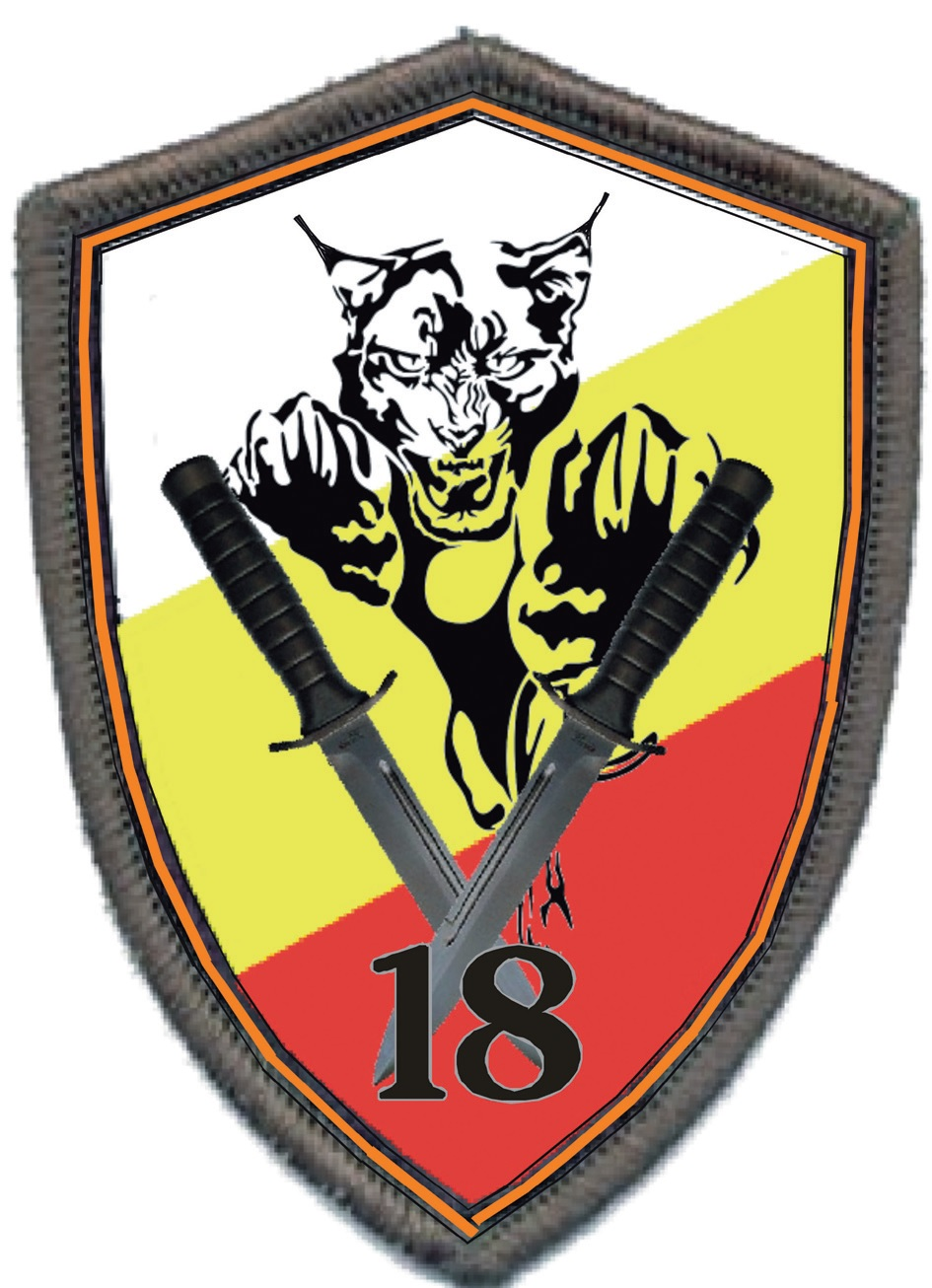
- Shoulder sleeve insignia

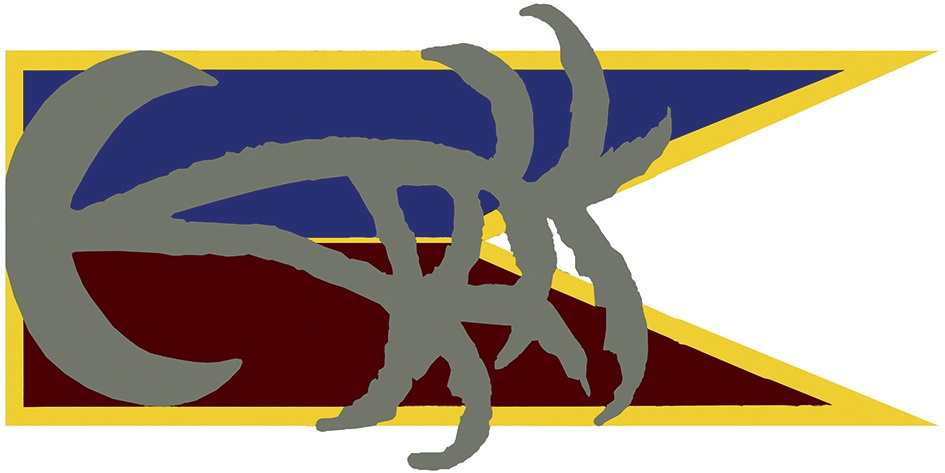
- Beret flash

18th Reconnaissance Regiment (Polish: 18 Pułk Rozpoznawczy) is a unit of the Polish Land Forces and is based in Białystok. It was formed from the former 18th Territorial Defense Battalion, which in turn was the former 18th Mechanized Brigade. It is the most recently formed unit of the Polish army, and one of three reconnaissance regiments.

== History ==
On 23 April 2009 the Polish Minister of National Defense, Bogdan Klich, announced that the 18th Territorial Defense Battalion would be reorganized to create a reconnaissance regiment. The 18th Reconnaissance Regiment was formed on 1 July 2009. On 15 October 2009 the 18th Reconnaissance Regiment was authorised to use the standard of the 18th Territorial Defense Battalion until 15 August 2010.

On 11 November 2010, representatives of the 18th Reconnaissance Regiment, on behalf of the Minister of National Defense Bogdan Klich, paid tribute at the grave of the late ordinary orthodox archbishop of the Polish Army, Miron Chodakowski. The delegation was composed of the regimental commander Lieutenant Colonel Chris Lenkiewicz, Major Slawomir Ratyński and Captain Jan Busłowicz. The ceremony took place in the crypt church of the Annunciation of the Virgin Mary located in Supraśl, near Bialystok.

On 30 June 2011, the regiment received its regimental standard from Polish President Bronislaw Komorowski at a ceremony in Kosciuszko Square, Białystok before the monument to Marshal Józef Piłsudski. In late 2012 the regiment was posted to Afghanistan as part of the 12th rotation of the Polish Military Contingent there. It was proposed in 2014 that the model used to form the 18th Reconnaissance Regiment be used to establish further units and form a new reconnaissance brigade to be stationed in North-West Poland. The regiment took part in the Lynx 15 military exercises in December 2015.

== Regimental standard ==
The new standard bears the national colors and emblem, and also expresses symbolic elements associated with the Bialystok coat of arms and contains commemorative badges of merit from the military units formerly stationed there:

- 18th Territorial Defense Battalion and prior the former 18th Mechanized Brigade
- 18 Infantry Division (Polish: 18 Dywizji Piechoty)
- 42 Infantry Regiment im General Jan Henryk Dąbrowski (Polish: 42 Pułku Piechoty)
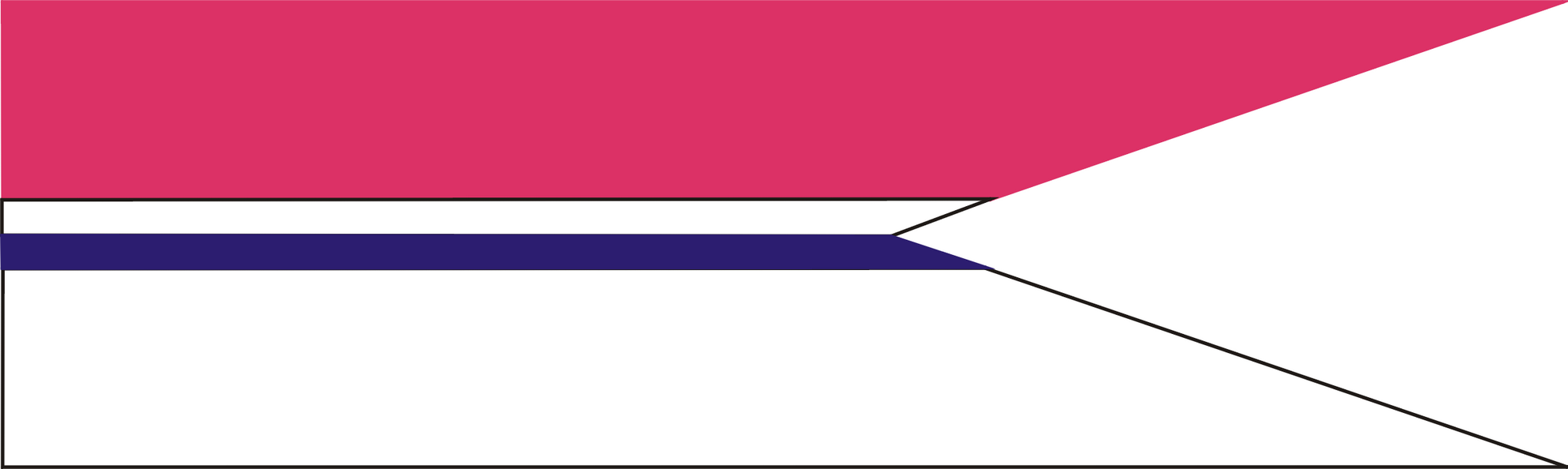
- 10 Lithuanian Cavalry Regiment (Polish: 10 Pułku Ułanów Litewskich)

== Organization ==
The regiment has the following component sub-units:

- Regimental Command Staff
- Command Company
- Logistics Company
- 1st Reconnaissance Company
- 2nd Reconnaissance Company
- 3rd Reconnaissance Company
- 4th Reconnaissance Company
- 5th Reconnaissance Company
- 6th Reconnaissance Company
