= 12th Mechanised Division (Poland) =

Division of the Polish Armed Forces

Coordinates: 49.8513°N 18.3097°E

12th "Bolesław Krzywousty Szczecin" Mechanised Division
- 12 Szczecińska Dywizja Zmechanizowana im. Bolesława Krzywoustego
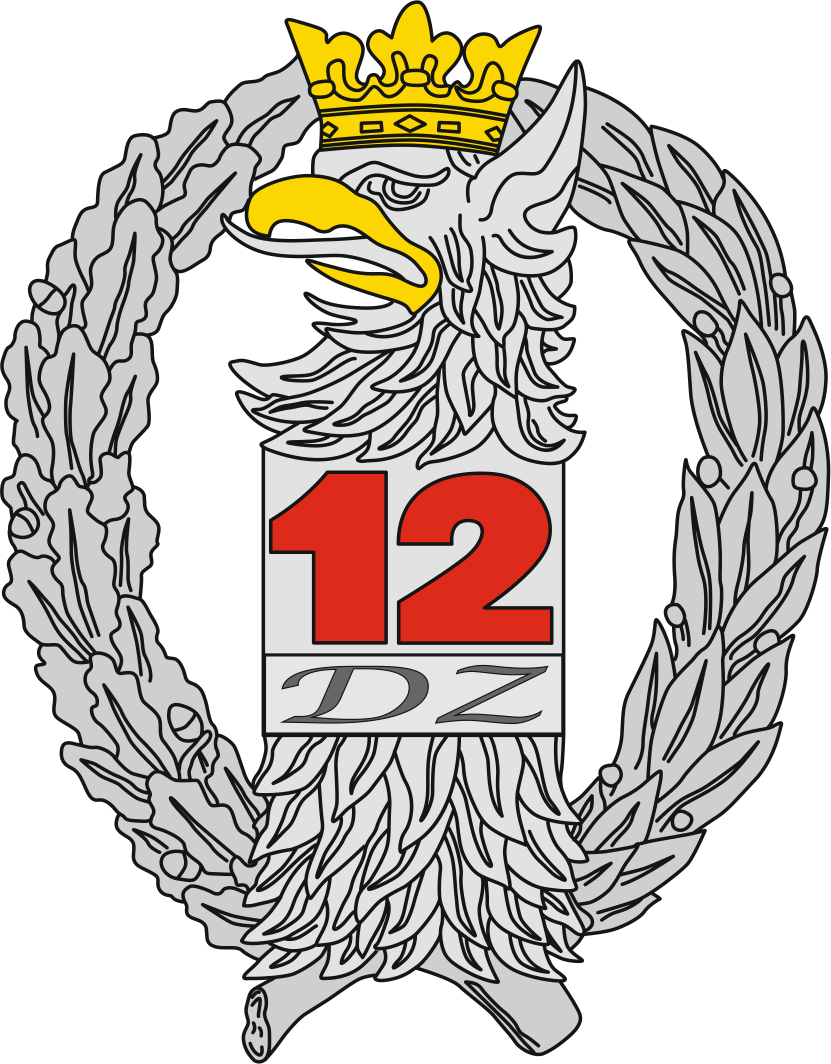
- Active: 1958–present (traditions from 1919)
- Country: Poland
- Branch: Polish Land Forces
- Type: Mechanised infantry
- Part of: Armed Forces General Command
- Garrison/HQ: Szczecin
- Patron: Boleslaw Krywousty
- Anniversaries: 28 June (feast day since 2008), 15 March (feast day before 2008)
- Engagements: Polish–Soviet War; World War II; Iraq War; War in Afghanistan
- Battle honours: Szczecin
- Website: 12sdz.wp.mil.pl/pl/

Commanders
- Current commander: Major General Maciej Jabłoński

Insignia
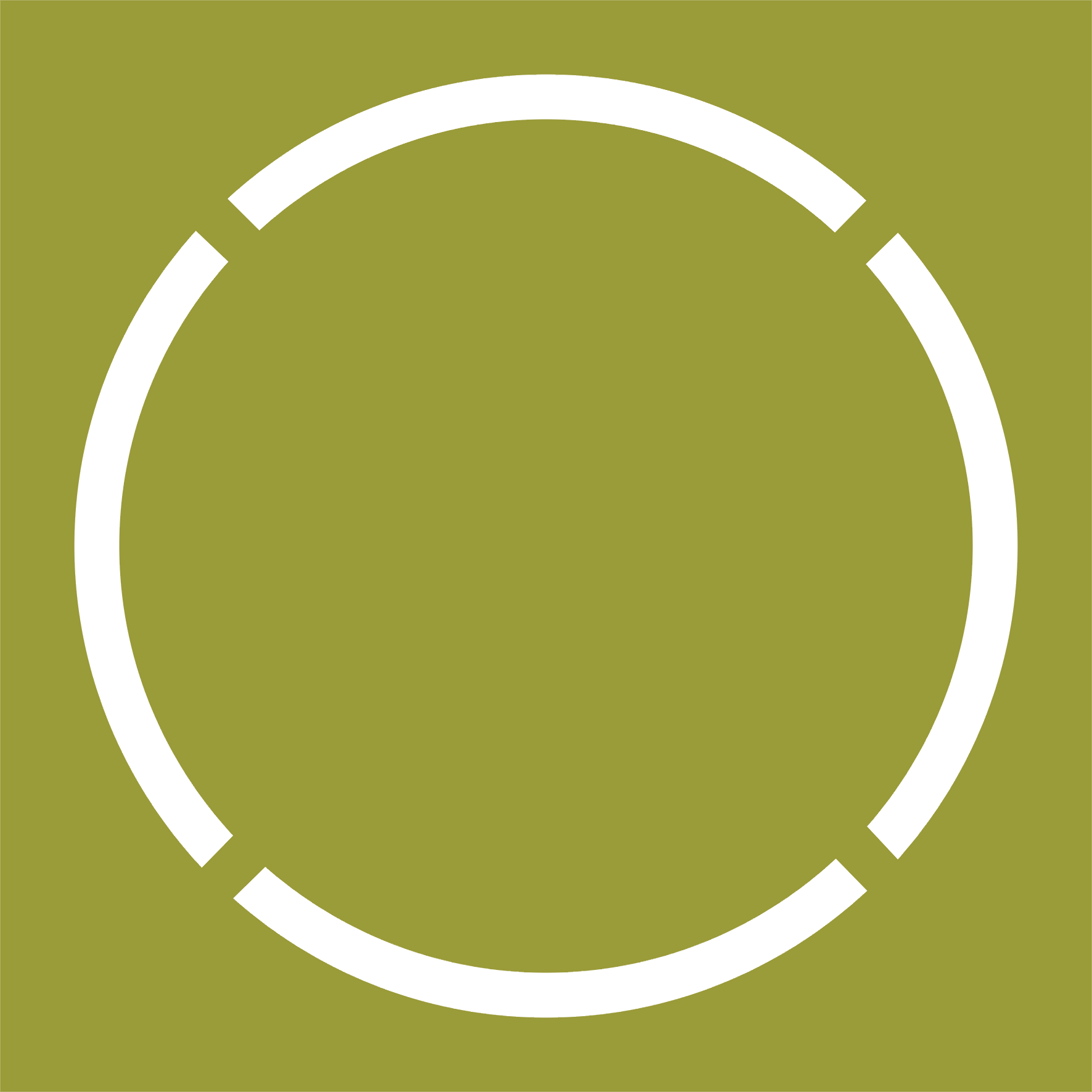
- Vehicle identification symbol (Polish People's Army)

The Bolesław Krzywousty Szczecin 12th Mechanised Division (Polish: 12 Szczecińska Dywizja Zmechanizowana im. Bolesława Krzywoustego (12 DZ, 12 SDZ)) is a division of the Polish Armed Forces, headquartered in Szczecin.

It traces its heritage back to the 1919 formation of the 6th Polish Rifle Division of the Blue Army in France. The division returned to Poland and was redesignated as the 12th Infantry Division (Polish: 12 Dywizja Piechoty) later that year, fighting in the Polish–Soviet War. During the September 1939 Invasion of Poland, the division was part of the southern group of the Prusy Army and was surrounded and destroyed by German forces during the Battle of Radom. It was briefly reformed in 1944 as part of the Home Army, and later that year the Polish People's Army briefly formed a 12th Infantry Division as part of the abortive 3rd Polish Army, but it was quickly broken up. The Polish People's Army reformed the division in Poznań during the final weeks of World War II, and it was sent to Szczecin to secure the area and expel the German population in the immediate postwar period. The division has remained headquartered at Szczecin since then, and was converted into a mechanised division in 1958.

== History ==
=== Interwar period ===
Between the wars, the division was stationed in Tarnopol. It consisted of several regiments, scattered in towns of Podolia:

- 51st Giuseppe Garibaldi Kresy Rifles Infantry Regiment, stationed in Brzeżany and Czortków,
- 52nd Kresy Rifles Infantry Regiment, stationed in Złoczów,
- 54th Kresy Rifles Infantry Regiment, stationed in Tarnopol,
- 12th Kresy Light Artillery Regiment, stationed in Złoczów,
- 12th Heavy Artillery Regiment, stationed in Tarnopol.

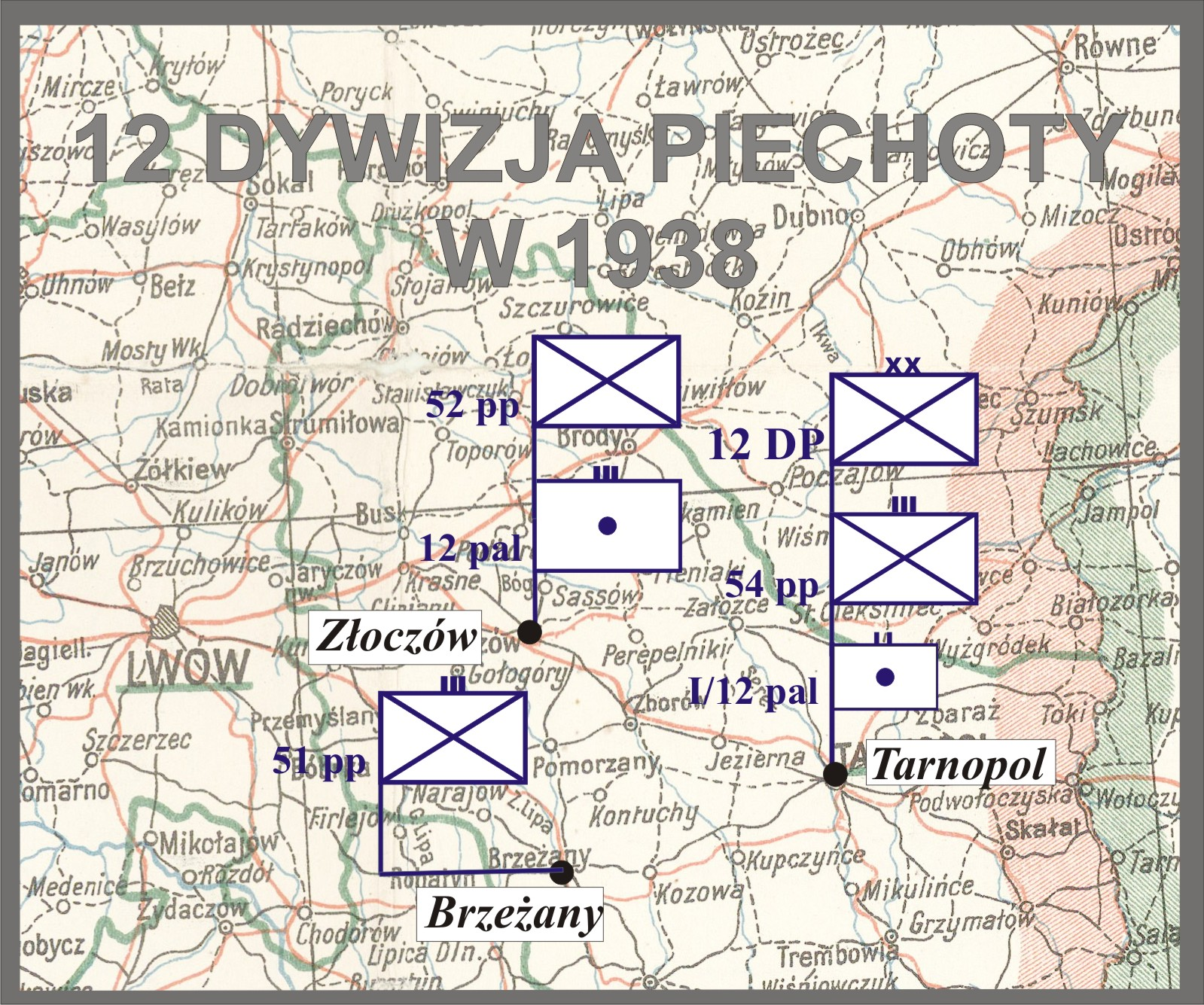
Location of the 12th Infantry Division in 1938

=== Polish September Campaign ===
In June 1939 the Division, under General Gustaw Paszkiewicz, was ordered to remain in reserve and became part of the southern wing of the Prusy Army. In early September 1939, it was transported from Tarnopol to the area of Kielce.

On September 7, 12th I.D. left its positions by Skarżysko-Kamienna and headed towards Iłża. There, it engaged in combat with 3rd Light Division of the Wehrmacht. In the following days, the unit fought a bloody battle with German XV Light Corps of General Hermann Hoth. On September 9, Polish soldiers got to German positions but were stopped by tanks. As a result, the Poles panicked, the Division was cut off from the line of the Vistula and as such ceased to exist. Its remnants crossed the river and were recreated as brigades, taking part in the Battle of Tomaszów Lubelski, where they capitulated on September 27.

=== Home Army ===
In the first half of 1944, when Operation Tempest was prepared, the 12th I.D. was recreated in the area of Tarnopol and Lwów.

=== Polish People's Army ===
The 12th Infantry Division was formed by the Polish People's Army in the Zamość region beginning on 6 October 1944. It was intended to become part of the 3rd Polish Army, and included the 19th, 21st, and 25th Infantry Regiments, the 41st Light Artillery Regiment, and the 8th Self-Propelled Artillery Battalion equipped with the SU-76, among other support units. The attempt to create the 3rd Polish Army was abandoned on 15 November, and the personnel of the 12th, still beginning their organization, were dispersed to units of the 2nd Polish Army, while the weapons and equipment were returned to the storage of the 1st Belorussian Front.

The second 12th Infantry Division of the Polish People's Army began forming on 15 March 1945 under the command of Red Army officer Colonel Viktor Lemantovich. Its headquarters, 41st Rifle Regiment, 34th Light Artillery Regiment, and 15th Anti-Tank Artillery Battalion, with other support units, formed in Poznań, while the 43rd Rifle Regiment formed in Biedrusko and the 39th Rifle Regiment and remaining support units formed in Gniezno. It completed its formation by May. After the end of the war, the elements of the division left their places of formation on 9 June and became part of the 2nd Polish Army in Western Pomerania. There, they participated in agricultural work and mine clearance, securing the region and organizing military settlement.

Its main task was to protect the border in the region of Szczecin. A combined infantry regiment from the division took part in Operation Vistula in 1947, against the Ukrainian Insurgent Army.

In December 1958 the 12th Infantry Division was reorganized as a mechanised division (pl:12 Dywizja Zmechanizowana). Headquarters was located as Szczecin.

== Structure ==
On 19 April 1994, the division received the honorific Szczecin in honor of its headquarters location, and Medieval Duke of Poland Bolesław III Wrymouth was made its patron. By a 16 March 2009 decision of the Polish Minister of National Defence, the 12th Mechanised Division inherited the traditions of the 6th Polish Rifle Division, 12th Infantry Division, 12th Infantry Division of the Home Army, in addition to those of the 12th Infantry Division of the Polish People's Army. Its feast day was changed to 28 June, the anniversary of the establishment of the 6th Polish Rifle Division.

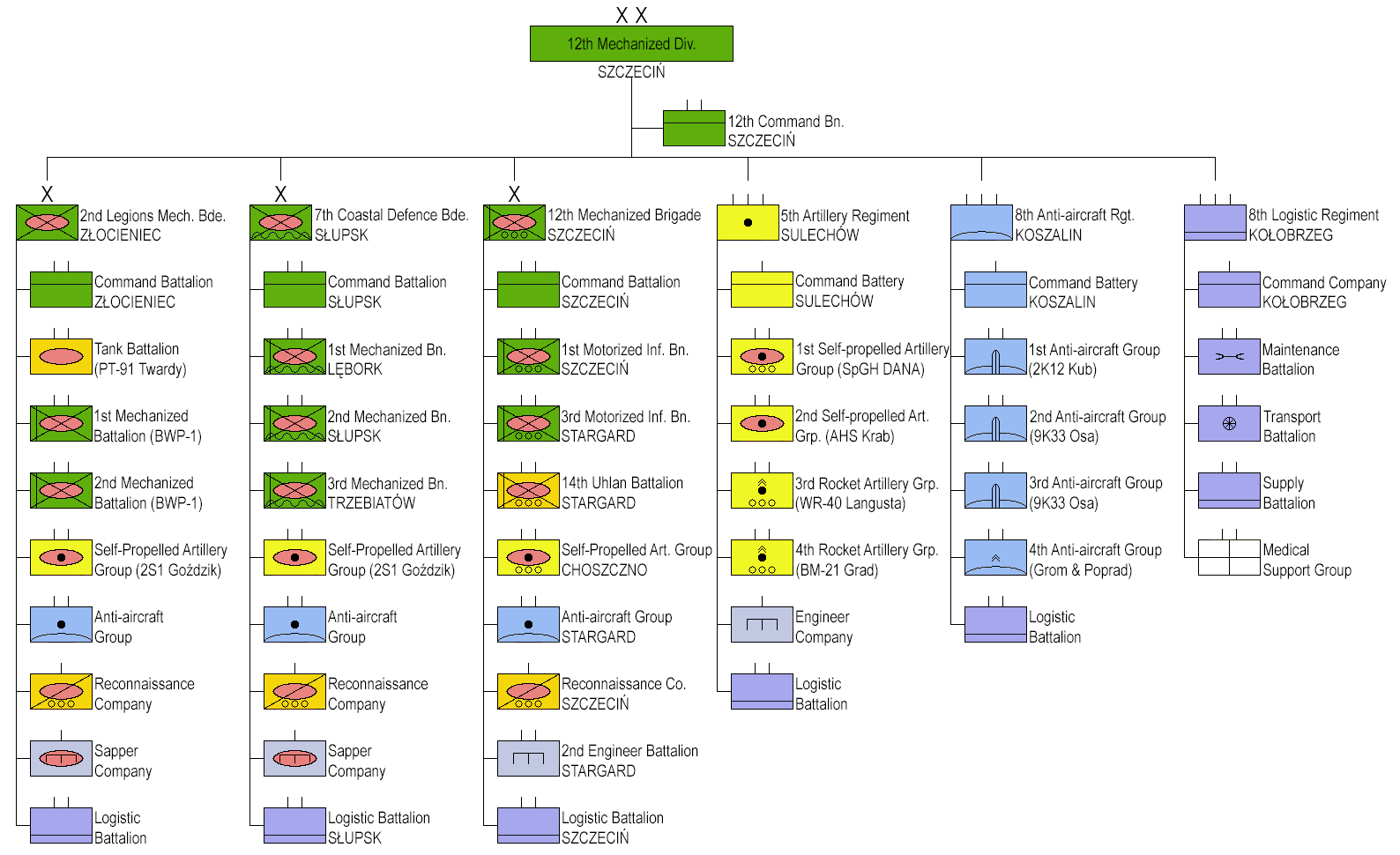
12th Mechanised Division Organisation (click image to enlarge)

12th Mechanised Division units 2020

As of 2020, the 12th Mechanised Division consists of:

- 12th Command Battalion in Szczecin
- 2nd Legion Mechanised Brigade in Złocieniec
- 7th Coastal Defense Brigade in Słupsk
- 12th Mechanised Brigade in Szczecin
- 5th Artillery Regiment in Sulechów
- 8th Air-defense Regiment in Koszalin
- 8th Logistic Regiment in Kołobrzeg

The division is part of the NATO-aligned Multinational Corps North East.

== Commanders ==
- Major General Maciej Jabłoński (29 June 2018–present)

== See also ==
- Polish army order of battle in 1939
- List of Polish divisions in World War II
