= Cavalry Squadron of the Polish Armed Forces =

Cavalry Squadron of Polish Armed Forces
- Szwadron Kawalerii Wojska Polskiego
- Shoulder patch
- Active: 1 June 2000–Present
- Country: Poland
- Branch: Polish Land Forces
- Type: Cavalry
- Role: Public duties
- Size: 2 Troops
- Part of: Representative Honor Guard Regiment of the Polish Armed Forces under Warsaw Garrison Command
- HQ: Franciszka Hynka Street, Warsaw

Insignia
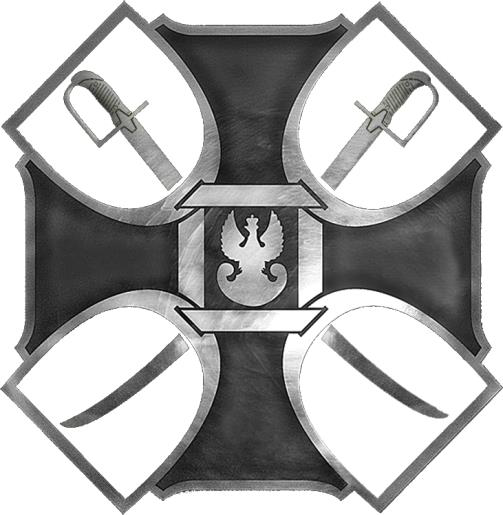
- Distinctive unit insignia

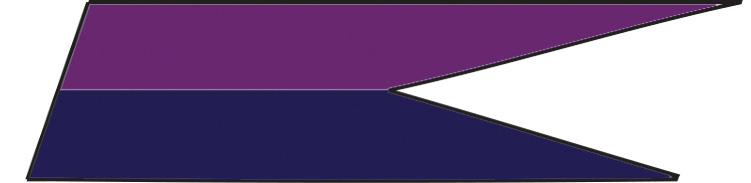
- Beret flash

The Cavalry Squadron of Polish Armed Forces (Polish: Szwadron Kawalerii Wojska Polskiego) is a cavalry unit (dressed in the traditions of the uhlans) that is part of the Representative Honor Guard Regiment. It serves as the travelling mounted escort of the President of Poland, who serves as the Supreme Commander of the Polish Armed Forces. This cavalry unit, raised in 2000, is the successor of the heritage and traditions of the cavalry units of the Polish Land Forces dating from many centuries. Apart from the escort of dignitaries, it also participates in ceremonial military parades, official anniversary celebrations and historical reenactments.

== Brief history and description ==
Cavalry units existed in the Polish Army for most of the Second World War and even during the early post-war years as purely combat units until 27 January 1947, when the 1st Warsaw Cavalry Division was disbanded. That same year, the Representative Squadron of the President of Poland founded to serve the leadership of the Provisional Government of National Unity. It followed the customs of Polish-Lithuanian light cavalry. It was disbanded the following July due to the rise of the creation People's Republic of Poland and the usurpation of power by the Polish United Workers' Party.

After the Fall of Nations and the Soviet Union between 1989 and 1991, there was hope from civil society and military historians that the military would expand to allow Polish cavalry units once again. After a public effort by enthusiasts, including negotiations between the Ministry of National Defense and the Association of Horse Squadrons on 12 November 1996, a Representative Squadron under the auspices of the Land Forces was raised in 2000. Originally, it was part of the 2nd Mińsk Mazowiecki Brigade of Territorial Defense Forces. From 2005, the unit was transferred to the command of the 3rd Security Battalion of the Land Forces Command in Warsaw. Since 2009, it has been part of the 1st Guards Battalion, Representative Honor Guard Regiment and have been composed of only professional soldiers instead of volunteers.

On 25 June 2007, the Cavalry Squadron began the practice of taking part in state arrival ceremonies at the Presidential Palace for visiting heads of state. Despite the fact that it is officially a reconnaissance unit, it has only representative functions. Members of the squadron are armed with ceremonial sabres and lances with red and black pennant banners. An identification mark and beret pennant was introduced in April 2015.

== Gallery ==
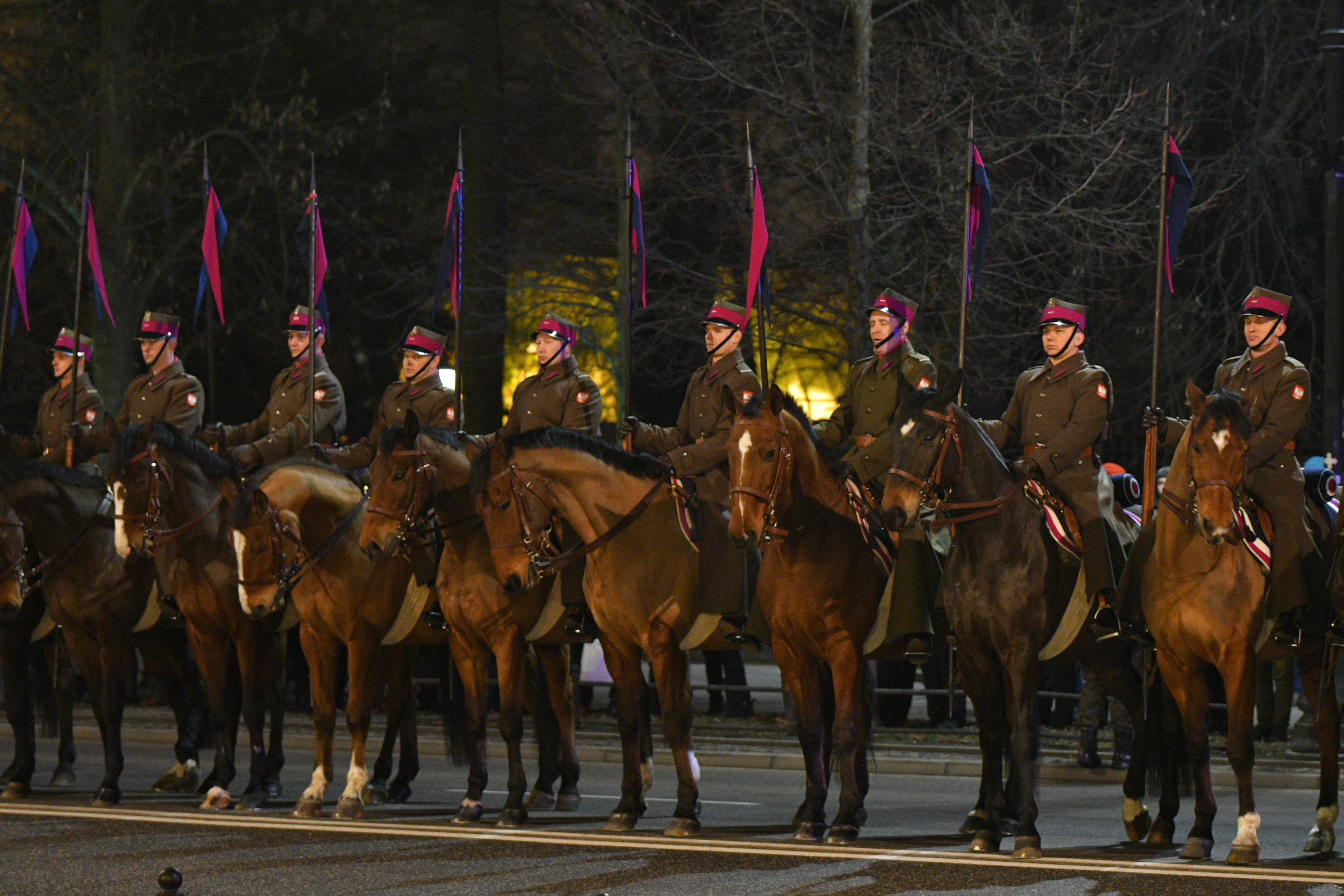
The squadron at nighttime

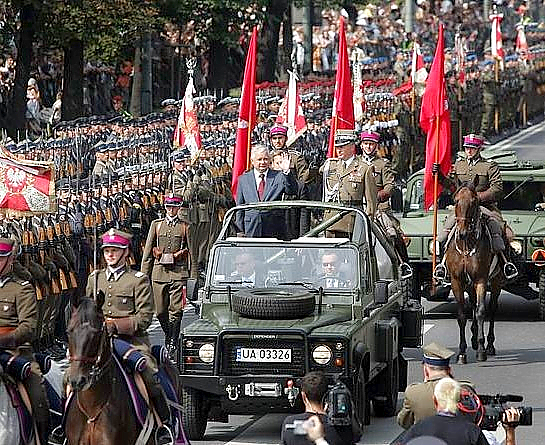
The squadron escorting President Lech Kaczyński during the 2007 Armed Forces Day parade.

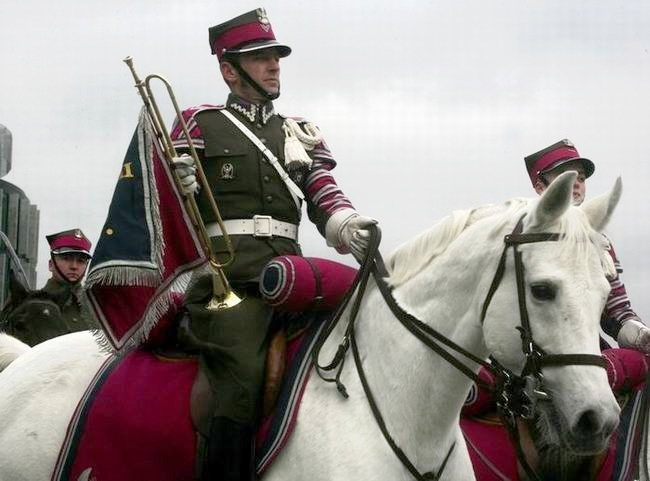
A fanfare trumpets of the squadron at the 2007 National Independence Day ceremonies.

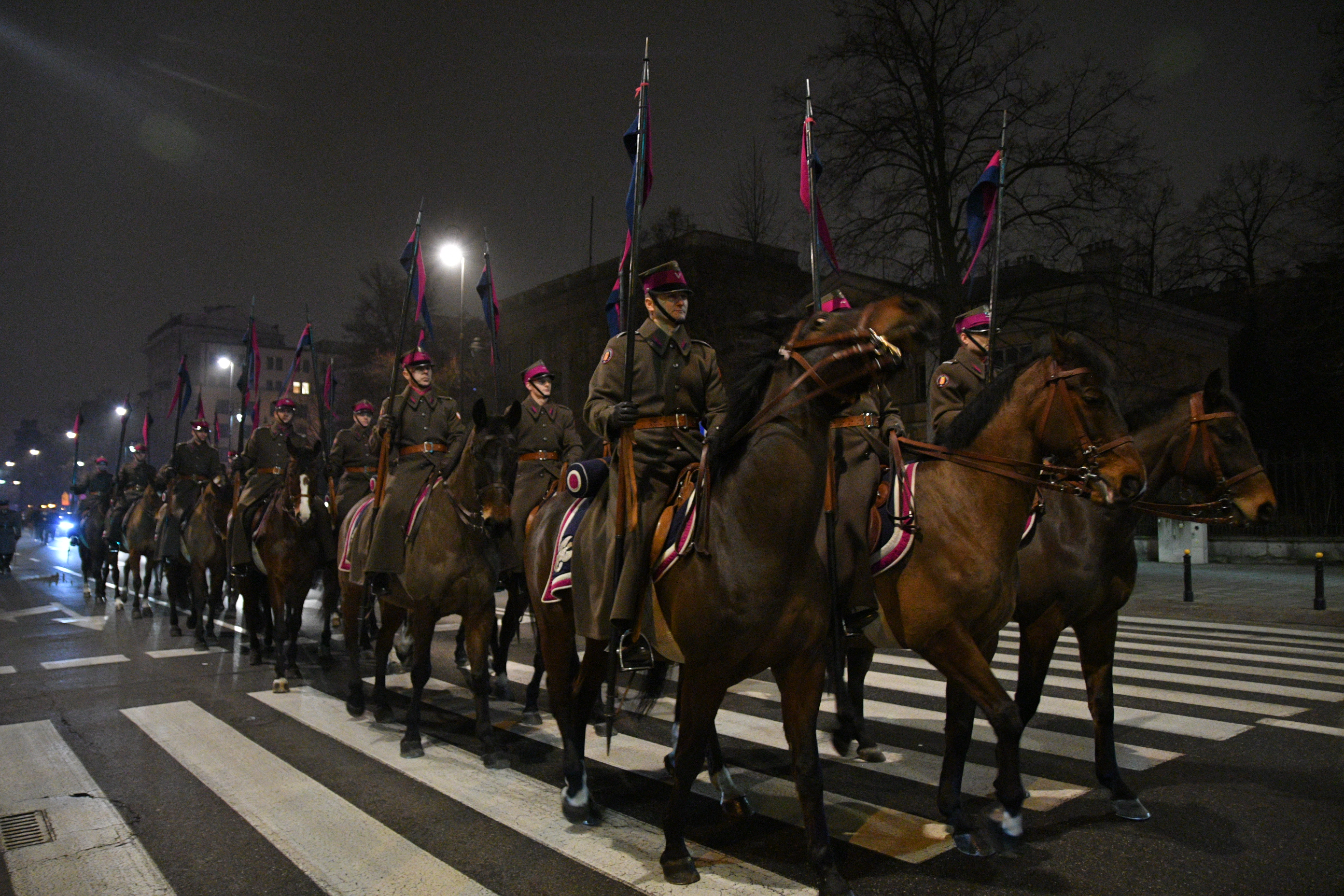

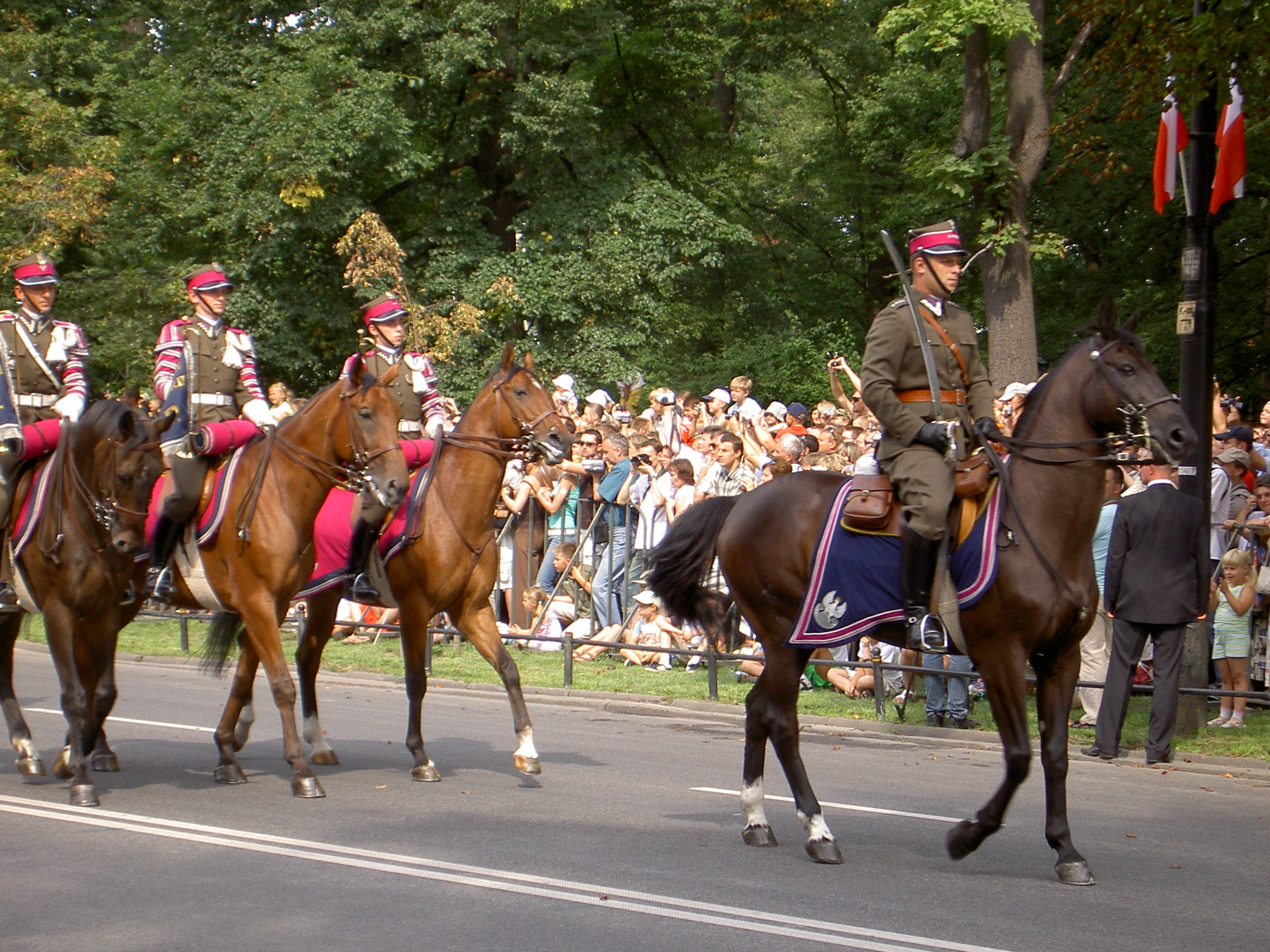
The squadron on Ujazdów Avenue.

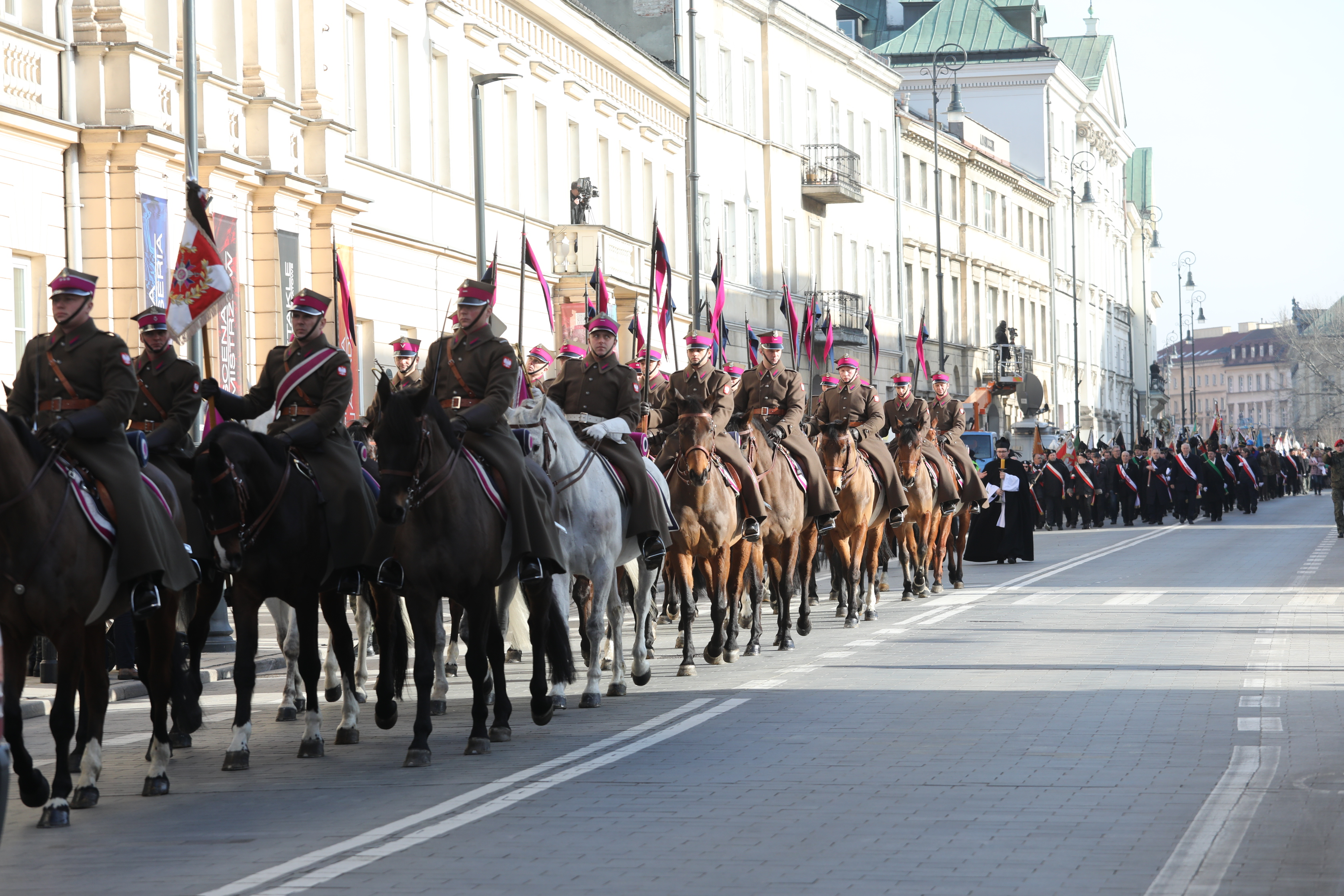
Squadron escorting the coffin of former Prime Minister of Poland Jan Olszewski during his funeral ceremony in February 2019.
