= Hibneryt =

Hibernyt
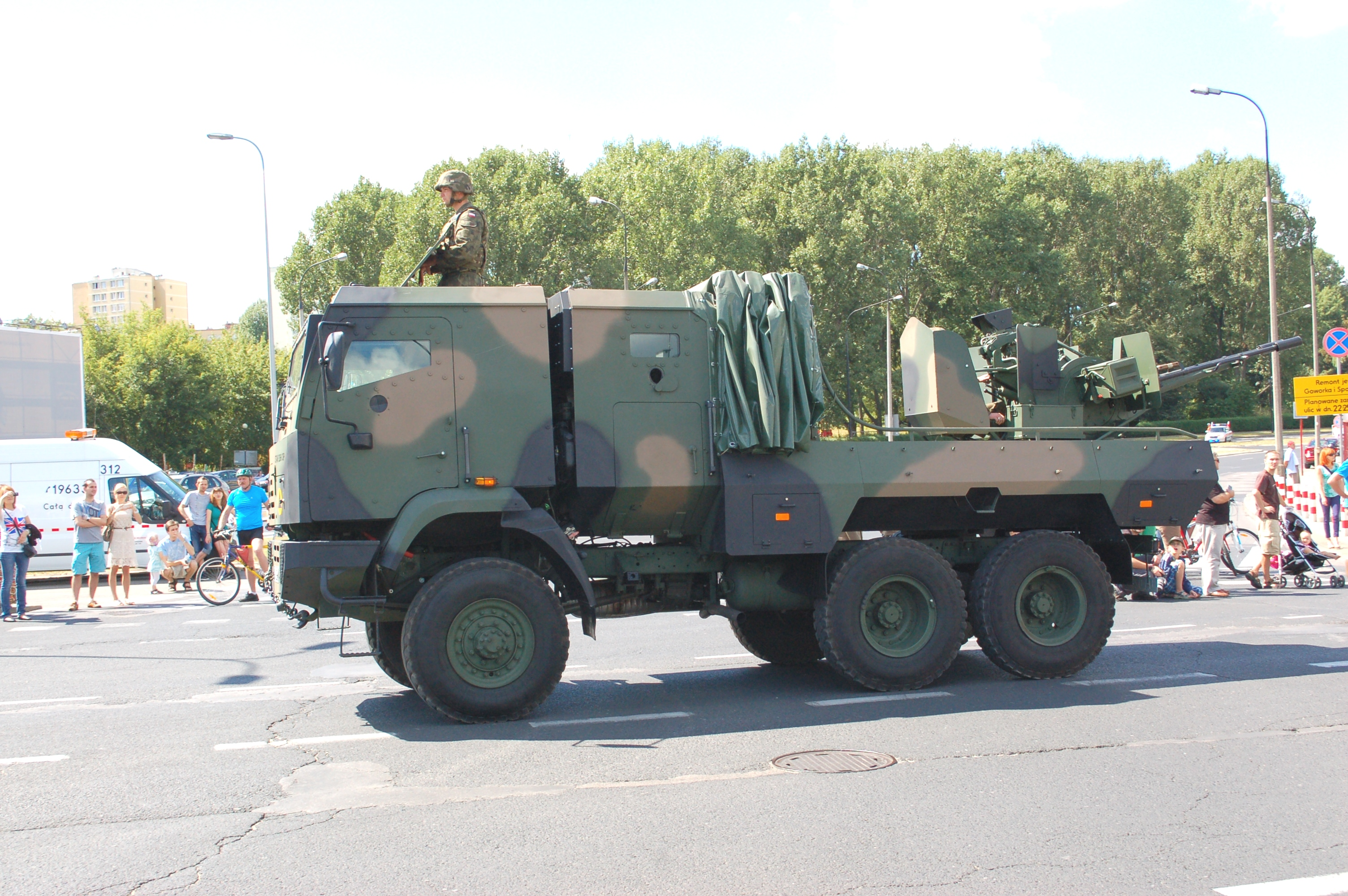
- Hibernyt-3
- Place of origin: Poland

Service history
- Used by: Poland; Ukraine
- Wars: Russo-Ukrainian War: Russian invasion of Ukraine

Specifications
- Mass: 11 370 kg (combat weight)
- Length: 7090 mm (Hibneryt-3)
- Width: 2540 mm (Hibneryt-3)
- Height: 2986 mm (Hibneryt-3)
- Crew: 5
- Maximum speed: 80 km/h

The Hibneryt is a Polish armored radar-directed self-propelled anti-aircraft gun system. A ZU-23-2 or ZUR-23-2S short-range air defense towed twin 23 mm autocannon fitted onto the Star 266's truck bed which has been modified and elevated to allow the AA gun to fire more freely. The wheels haven't been removed which allows the crew to remove the autocannon if need be which can be used as it originally was. The vehicle carries the ammo and equipment for the AA gun.

- Hibneryt-KG - Hibneryt armed with ZUR-23-2KG Jodek-G short-range air defense towed twin 23 mm autocannon. It has a storage space for the GROM missiles as well as engine-generator for the AA gun.
- Hibneryt-P - Custom variant made by soldiers from 3rd District Technological Workshops in Nowy Dwór Mazowiecki.

== See also ==
- Flakpanzer Gepard
- Marksman
- K30 Biho
- Type 87
- 9K22 Tunguska
