= ZSU-23-4MP Biała =

ZSU-23-4 Biała
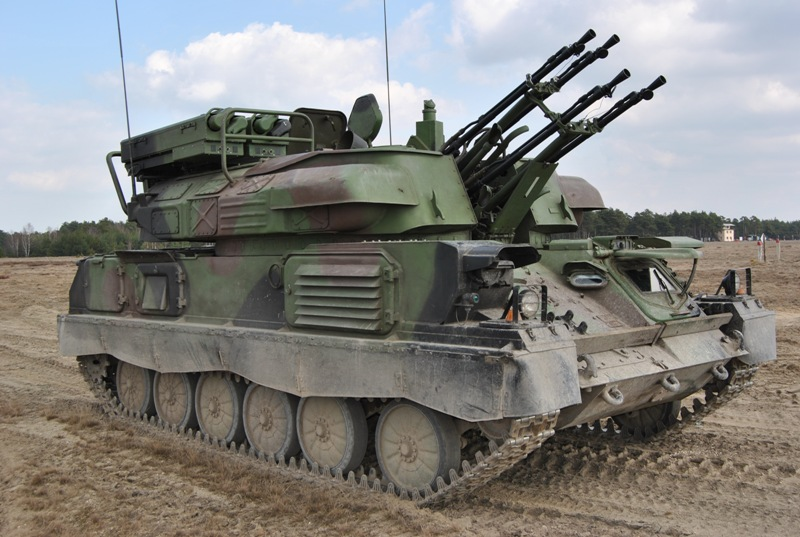
- Photo of the ZSU-23-4 Biała
- Type: Self-propelled anti-aircraft gun
- Place of origin: Poland

Service history
- Used by: See Operators

Production history
- Manufacturer: Zakłady Mechaniczne Tarnów

Specifications
- Mass: 20.5 t
- Length: 6.54 m
- Width: 2.95 m
- Height: 2.25 m
- Crew: 3
- Armor: 8.3-9.2 mm
- Main armament: 4 23 mm AZP-23 autocannons (2,000 rounds)
- Secondary armament: 4 PZR Grom missiles
- Engine: V-6R 6 cylinder inline diesel 280 hp (210 kW)
- Power/weight: 13.7 hp/tonne
- Suspension: torsion bar
- Operational range: 450 km
- Maximum speed: 50 km/h

The ZSU-23-4MP "Biała" (pl. White, also the name of more than one small Polish river) is a Polish modification of the ZSU-23-4 Shilka self-propelled anti-aircraft gun.

== History ==
The ZSU-23-4MP Biała was adopted in December of 2005 with a prototype delivered in February 2005. A contract for service on the vehicles between 2021 and 2024 was signed in November 2021.

== Description ==
The ZSU-23-4MP "Biała" includes a new digital optical targeting system and 4 Grom surface-to-air missile launcher. The AZP-23 autocannons are equipped with modern ammunition and have an increased effective anti-aircraft range to about 3.5 km, 0.5–1 km more than the original ZSU-23-4. The Grom missiles' maximum range is about 5.5 km.

== Operators ==
=== Current ===
- Poland - 20 ZSU-23-4MP Białas in service, along with 2 unmodified ZSU-23-4 Shilkas as of 2022
