= Święte =

Święte may refer to:

- Święte, Lower Silesian Voivodeship (south-west Poland)
- Święte, Aleksandrów County in Kuyavian-Pomeranian Voivodeship (north-central Poland)
- Święte, Grudziądz County in Kuyavian-Pomeranian Voivodeship (north-central Poland)
- Święte, Świecie County in Kuyavian-Pomeranian Voivodeship (north-central Poland)
- Święte, Subcarpathian Voivodeship (south-east Poland)
- Święte, Gniezno County in Greater Poland Voivodeship (west-central Poland)
- Święte, Konin County in Greater Poland Voivodeship (west-central Poland)
- Święte, Lubusz Voivodeship (west Poland)
- Święte, Pomeranian Voivodeship (north Poland)
- Święte, West Pomeranian Voivodeship (north-west Poland)

== See also ==
- Kolonia Święte
- Święte Laski
- Święte Miejsce, Masovian Voivodeship
- Święte Nowaki
