= Sierakowice =

Sierakowice may refer to:

- Sierakowice, Silesian Voivodeship, a village in Gliwice County, Silesian Voivodeship, Poland
- Gmina Sierakowice, an administrative district in Kartuzy County, Pomeranian Voivodeship, Poland
- Sierakowice, Pomeranian Voivodeship, the seat of Gmina Sierakowice
- Sierakowice (PKP station), a railway station in Sierakowice, Pomeranian Voivodeship
- Sierakowice-Wybudowanie, a settlement in Gmina Sierakowice
- Sierakowice Prawe, a village in Gmina Skierniewice
- Sierakowice Lewe, a village in Gmina Skierniewice
