= Rzymiec, Skierniewice County =

Rzymiec
- Village
- Location within Poland
- Coordinates: 51°54′15″N 20°8′45″E
- Country: Poland
- Voivodeship: Łódź
- County: Skierniewice
- Gmina: Skierniewice

Rzymiec [ˈʐɨmjɛt͡s] is a village in the administrative district of Gmina Skierniewice, within Skierniewice County, Łódź Voivodeship, in central Poland.
