= Bonarów =

- Village
- Location within Poland
- Coordinates: 51°52′N 19°55′E
- Country: Poland
- Voivodeship: Łódź
- County: Skierniewice
- Gmina: Słupia

Bonarów [bɔˈnaruf] is a village in the administrative district of Gmina Słupia, within Skierniewice County, Łódź Voivodeship, in central Poland.
