= Maria Rodziewiczówna =

Polish writer

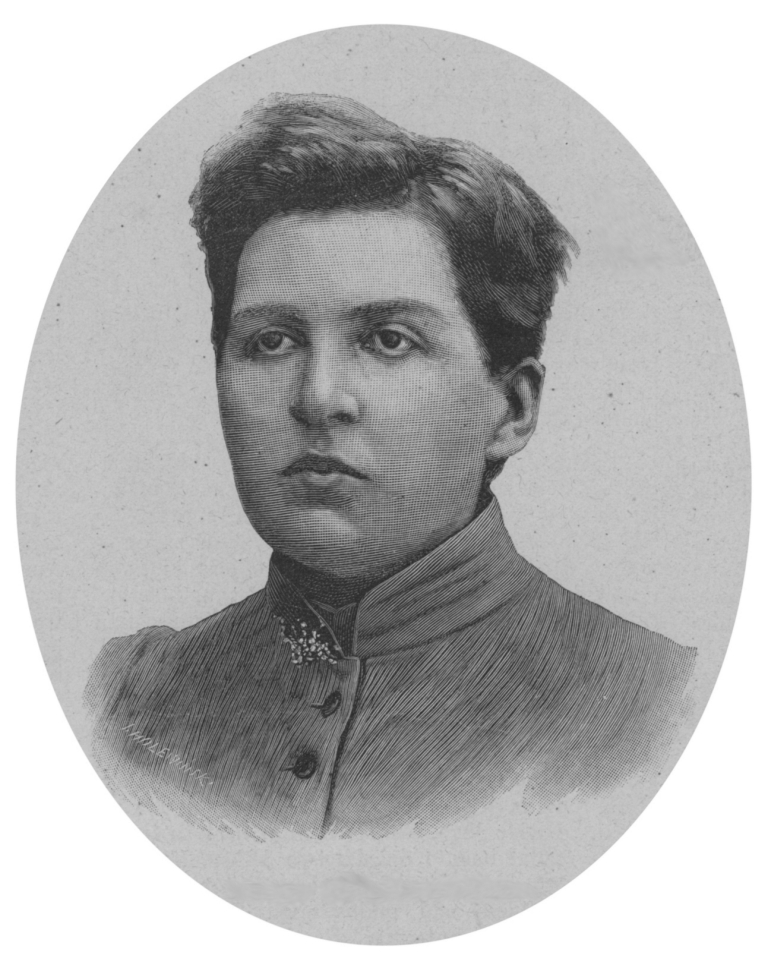
- Born: 2 February 1863; Pieniuha, Volkovyssky Uyezd, Grodno Governorate (now Belarus)
- Died: 6 November 1944 (aged 81) near Żelazna, Poland
- Occupation: novelist
- Writing career
- Pen name: Žmogus; Mario; Weryho
- Notable works: Lato leśnych ludzi, Między ustami a brzegiem pucharu, Straszny dziadunio

Maria Rodziewiczówna (2 February 1863 – 6 November 1944, near Żelazna) was a Polish writer, among the most famous of the interwar years. Her works often addressed patriotism, rural life, and praised the countryside and peasantry. Rodziewiczówna is also noted for advocating for women's rights. Her writings include Wrzos (Heather), Dewajtis, Lato leśnych ludzi (Summer of the Forest People), Straszny dziadunio (Eerie Grandpa).

== Biography ==
=== Early life ===
Rodziewiczówna came from a land-owning nobility family. She was the daughter of Henryk Rodziewicz and Amelia (née Kurzeniecki). Her parents were sentenced to confiscation of their family estate at Pieniuha in Vawkavysk and to deportation to Siberia for help given to the January uprising insurgents (storing weapons). Amelia, who was pregnant with Maria at that time, was allowed to give birth and a few months later was deported in a carriage, for which she had paid. During her parents' stay in exile, the Rodziewicz children were put in the care of various relatives. Initially, Maria's grandparents took care of the Kurzeniecki family in the Zamosze estate near Janów, and after their deaths, a friend and distant relative of her mother, Maria Skirmuntt, took care of her in Korzeniów in the Pinsk region.

In 1871, as a result of the amnesty, Maria's parents returned from exile. At that time, they could only settle outside the lands referred to as 'taken' by the Russians, i.e. not in the Grodno region, where the Rodziewicz family had relatives. They settled in Warsaw, where they found themselves in a very difficult financial situation (her father worked at a tenement house and her mother for some time in a cigarette factory). The family's situation improved somewhat when a distant relative, Ksawery Pusłowski, made Maria's father the administrator of his property. However, real improvement occurred in 1875, when Henryk Rodziewicz inherited the property Hruszowa in Polesie (1,533 hectares (3,790 acres) from his childless brother Teodor. It had not been a family property for long. (Rodziewiczówna's great-grandfather had bought it from Alexander Suvorov.)

During her stay in Warsaw, Rodziewiczówna started to attend Mrs Kuczyńska's finishing school. At the end of 1876, due to improvement in the family's financial situation, she was placed in the girls' lyceum in Yazlovets, Jazłowiec, run by the Congregation of the Sisters of the Immaculate Conception of the Blessed Virgin Mary, whose superior was Marcelina Darowska (beatified by John Paul II). There she stayed until the summer of 1879, when due to her father's illness and lack of money for further education she had to return to her family (she completed fifth or sixth grade). Staying at a school in Jazłowiec, where girls in a religious but patriotic atmosphere were prepared primarily for the future role of wife and mother, had a great impact on Rodziewiczówna. Her first works were also to be created here, most likely Kwiat lotosu (lotus flower).

=== Reign over Hruszowa ===
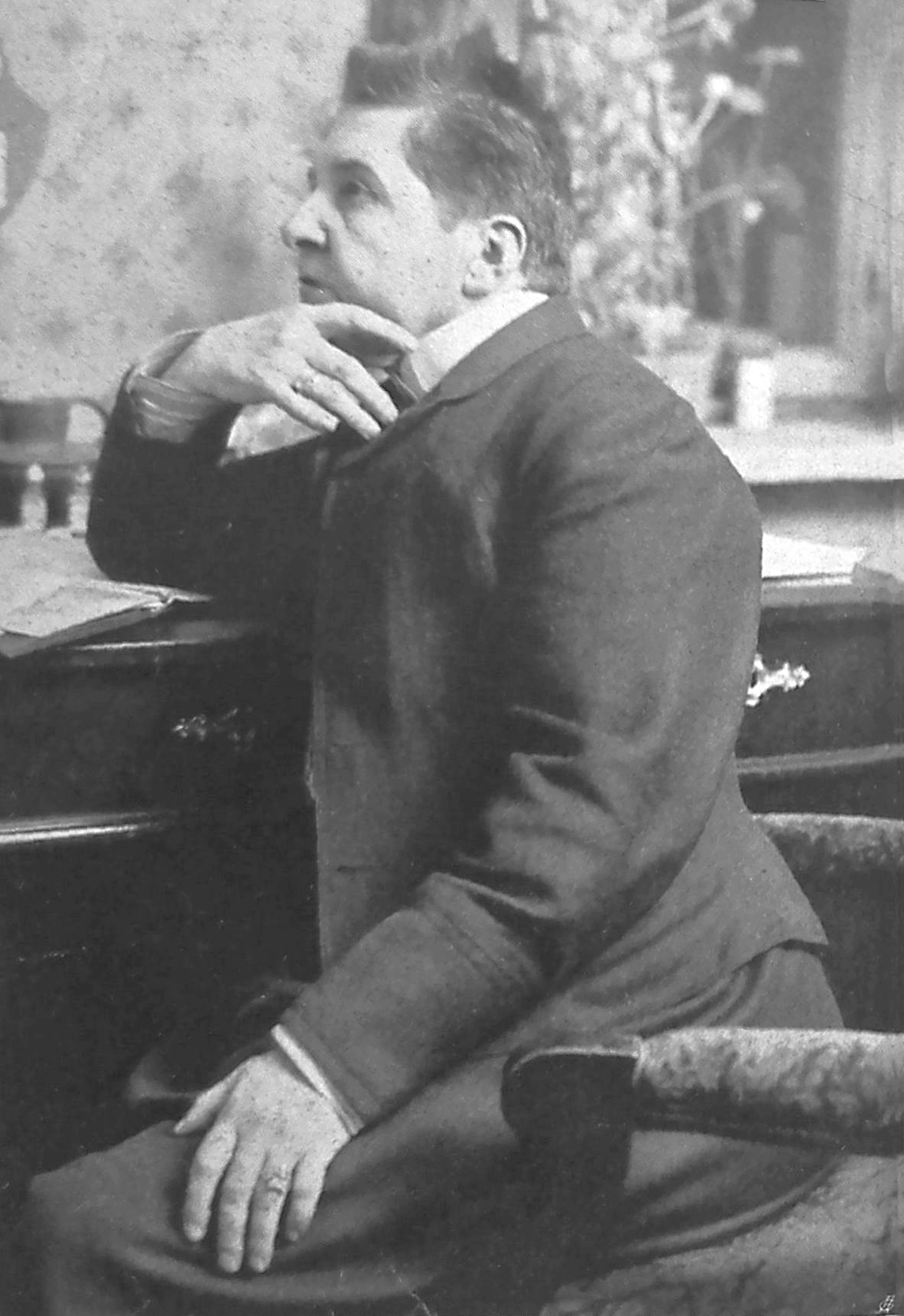
Maria Rodziewiczówna (1911)

In 1881 Rodziewiczówna's father died. After his death, she gradually began to take control of his estate until 1887, when she took it over formally (with the burden of her father's and uncle's debts as well as the need to repay her siblings). She cut her hair short with her mother's permission and in a short skirt and masculine coat she took care of Hruszowa, which, however, did not bring much income (despite a large acreage, farmland was at most a third of it).

In 1882 Maria Rodziewiczówna debuted under the pen name Mario in the third and fourth issues of Dziennik Anonsowy with two novelettes – Gama uczuć and Z dzienniczka reportera. She used the same pen name in 1884 in Świt, edited by Maria Konopnicka, with a story entitled Jazon Bobrowski, and a humoresque (a short, lively piece of music) published in 1885, Farsa Panny Heni. Her novel debut was Straszny dziadunio, which won in an 1886 competition held by Świt, which published the novel in episodic format.

The relationships of the estate with local Belarusian peasants varied. In 1890 the writer could face up to two weeks of arrest for the active assault (beating) of an Antopol shepherd (the case was solved amicably by paying the shepherd 5 rubles). In December 1900 there was an arson (a barn, threshers, and barn with fifty cattle burned). The estate dedicated itself to spreading culture, and local peasants could find medical aid there. In 1937, for the 50th anniversary of governing Hruszowa and 50 years of literary work, the villagers gave Rodziewiczówna a dedicated album, bought bells to her chapel and delivered bricks for free to the construction site of a Catholic church in Antopol (the church was co-founded by her).

After the death of her grandmother, mother and sister in the mid-90s, the writer lived alone at Hruszowa for some time. It is difficult to say when Helena Weychert, who Rodziewiczówna met in the Stowarzyszenie Ziemianek (landowners' association) moved to the estate as her life partner. Weychert introduced changes in the maintenance of the farm (such as introducing crop rotation or starting a distillery), which improved income. After a few years, she moved to Warsaw, buying, together with Rodziewiczówna, a flat on Bracka Street and a property near Falenica.

In 1919 her place was taken in Hruszowa by a new (introduced as a distant relative) partner of the writer - Jadwiga Skirmuntt. Jadwiga dealt with the "womanly household and farmkeeping", while Maria "left business and masculine farmkeeping to herself". This relation was described by Skirmuntt in her memoirs with the German word Wahlverwandtschaft, meaning spiritual affinity or affinity by choice.

The writer spent time at her estate in the company of Jadwiga Skirmuntt or Helena Weychert until World War I. Only in winter did she go to Warsaw for 2–3 months. She also made several trips abroad: to Rome (for 500 rubles obtained as a reward for Dewajtis), 2-3 times to southern France, and at least once to Munich, Sweden and Norway.

In 1905 she began organizing social activities; social tensions and the image of workers' misery made a great impression on her. In 1906, she founded the secret women's association Unia. She also contributed to the establishment of a grocery store and a store selling folk products in Warsaw, as well as a common room in the Kobryń poviat.

=== World War I ===
The outbreak of World War I found Rodziewiczówna in Warsaw. She took part in the organization of a military hospital; she also helped organize cheap kitchens for intelligentsia and academic assistance. In 1915 she returned to Hruszowa for some time, taking care of the refugees she had tried to keep there. In the years 1919–1920 she initiated a number of social activities in the area of Hruszowa, establishing an agricultural circle, building a steam room, and rebuilding the cheder in Antopol. During the Polish-Bolshevik war, she was in Warsaw, where she was the secretary of the Main Committee of the Polish Red Cross and was appointed commander of the Women's Volunteer Committee for the Relief of Lviv in the city of Warsaw. For her activity in this field, she was awarded the Orlęta Medal of Honor, which was accompanied by a diploma signed by General Tadeusz Rozwadowski. After the end of war, she returned to Hruszowa. Years later, Rodziewiczówna considered this diploma the most important memento of her activity.

=== Interwar period ===
In the interwar period, she tried to continue her educational and social activities; among others, she organized the Polish House in Antopol and financed the construction of a floor at the Kobryn School in her name). However, government policy in Kresy aroused her disapproval. She ideologically associated the maintenance of "Polishness" in these lands with the role of landowners and the Church. Meanwhile, the authorities demanded that her part of the estate 150 hectares (370 acres) be handed over for the needs of the settlement, which were also personally disputed with the starosta from Kobryn. She became a protector and co-founder of the Union of Homeland Nobility.

Rodziewiczówna had a critical attitude towards Jews based on her own experiences and observations of the environment, whom she considered exploiters (usury), who significantly contributed to the poverty of the Polesie village and the financial problems of the borderland landowners. This has often been reflected in her works, featuring the character of an evil Jew, but some of them had examples of positive and kind people who help Poles in trouble (e.g. Jaskółczym szlakiem).

In 1937 she was invited to join the authorities of Oboz Zjednoczenia Narodowego. She accepted the invitation but in 1938, in protest against their actions, she left the organization.

=== World War II ===
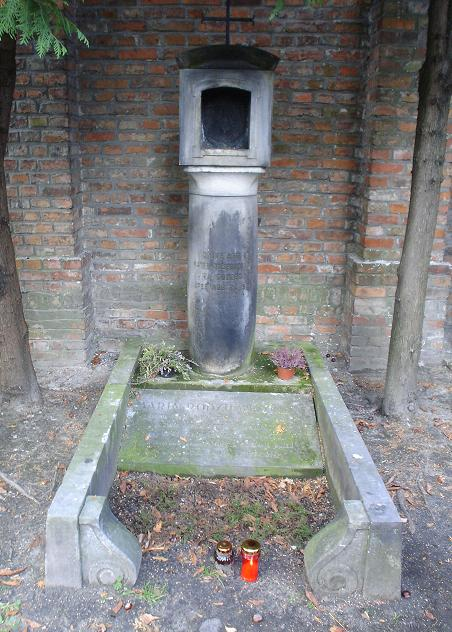
The grave of Maria Rodziewiczówna in Powązki

The outbreak of World War II found her in Hruszowa. She was displaced from it in October 1939 (the property, after the area was taken over by the Red Army, was taken over by a committee of local people). Based on false documents, she crossed the border of the German occupation and, together with Skirmuntt, got to the transit camp in Łódź at ul. Łąkowa 4, from which they were removed in March 1940 by the Mazaraki family, owners of the property near Tuszyn.

Shortly afterwards she went to Warsaw, i.e. to the General Government, where, assisted by friends, she spent the last years of her life in very difficult material conditions. During the Warsaw Uprising, the elderly writer was moved to several different homes or looked after by friends, the Polish Red Cross and the insurgents.

She left Warsaw after the surrender, spending a few weeks in Milanówek, and then heading to Żelazna, Aleksander Mazaraki, Jr's property near Skierniewice. Placed in a nearby forester's cabin in Leonów, she died of pneumonia in November 1944.

Initially, she was buried in Żelazna, but was re-interred in the Avenue of the Distinguished at the Powązki Cemetery in Warsaw.

=== Private life ===
As a teenager Maria declared that she would never marry. She spent her life with Helena Weychert and Jadwiga Skirmuntt, and their arrangement was that Maria would spend a few winter months in Warsaw with Helena, and the rest of the year in Hruszowa with Jadwiga. During her life only Irena Krzywicka would publicly imply that she was a lesbian, in a 1936 article in Wiadomości Literackie. Maria's behavior and attire were very masculine and noted by her contemporaries for that. Krzysztof Tomasik called her "the first butch of Polish literature".
