= Podłęcze =

Podłęcze may refer to the following places:

- Podłęcze, Łódź Voivodeship (central Poland)
- Podłęcze, Masovian Voivodeship (east-central Poland)
- Podłęcze, Gryfice County in West Pomeranian Voivodeship (north-west Poland)
- Podłęcze, Stargard County in West Pomeranian Voivodeship (north-west Poland)
