= Michowice =

- Village
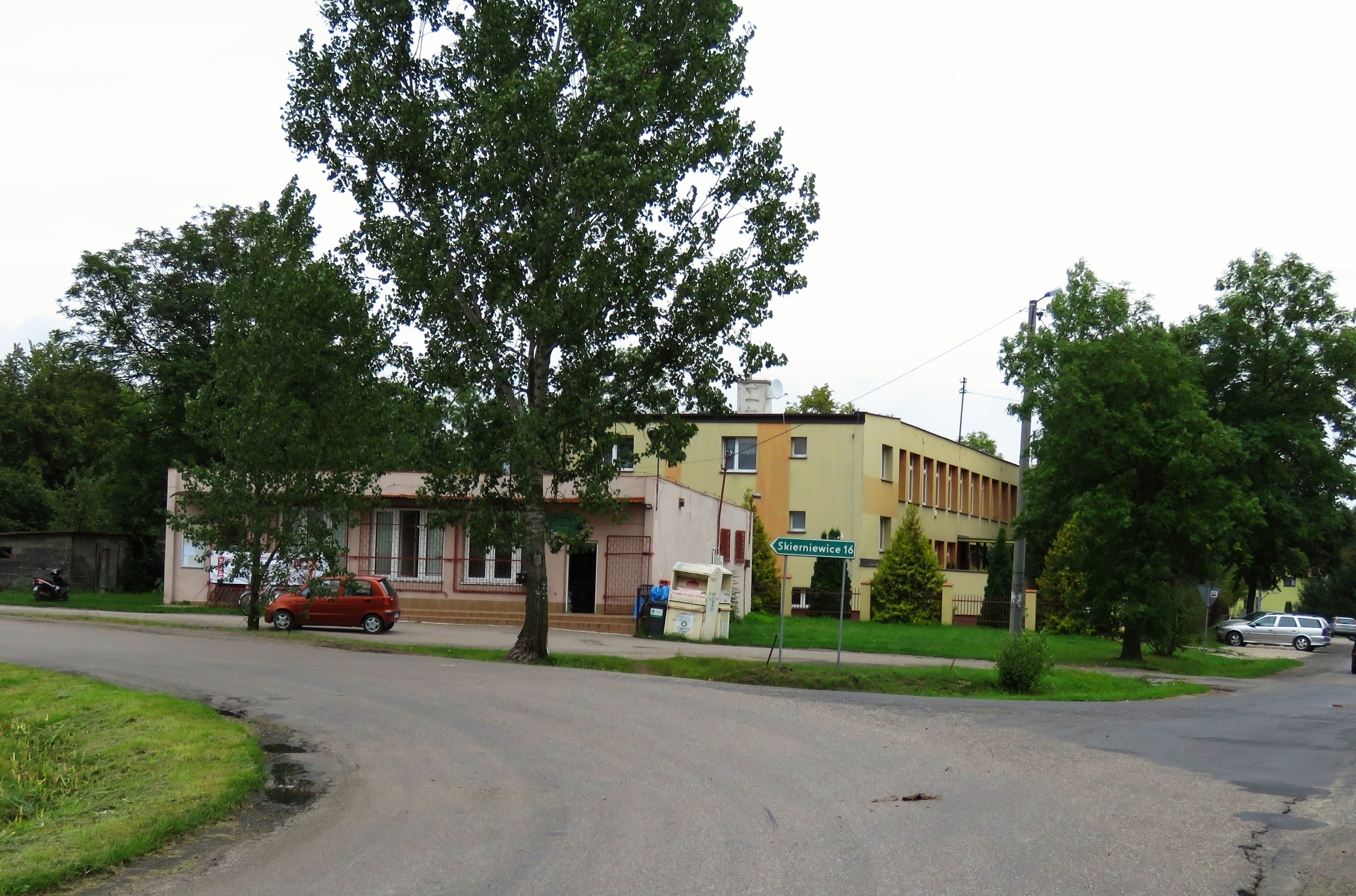

- Location within Poland
- Coordinates: 51°49′33″N 20°5′51″E
- Country: Poland
- Voivodeship: Łódź
- County: Skierniewice
- Gmina: Głuchów

Michowice [mixɔˈvit͡sɛ] is a village in the administrative district of Gmina Głuchów, within Skierniewice County, Łódź Voivodeship, in central Poland.
