= Ludwików, Skierniewice County =

Ludwików
- Village
- Location within Poland
- Coordinates: 51°55′41″N 20°8′11″E
- Country: Poland
- Voivodeship: Łódź
- County: Skierniewice
- Gmina: Skierniewice
- Population: 70

Ludwików [ludˈvikuf] is a village in the administrative district of Gmina Skierniewice, within Skierniewice County, Łódź Voivodeship, in central Poland.
