= Sielce Prawe =

- Village
- Location within Poland
- Coordinates: 51°59′18″N 20°3′5″E
- Country: Poland
- Voivodeship: Łódź
- County: Skierniewice
- Gmina: Maków
- Population: 150

Sielce Prawe [ˈɕɛlt͡sɛ ˈpravɛ] is a village in the administrative district of Gmina Maków, within Skierniewice County, Łódź Voivodeship, in central Poland.
