= Bonarów-Działki =

- Village
- Location within Poland
- Coordinates: 51°51′34″N 19°54′36″E
- Country: Poland
- Voivodeship: Łódź
- County: Skierniewice
- Gmina: Słupia

Bonarów-Działki [bɔˈnaruf ˈd͡ʑau̯ki] is a village in the administrative district of Gmina Słupia, within Skierniewice County, Łódź Voivodeship, in Central Poland.
