= Płyćwia =

- Village
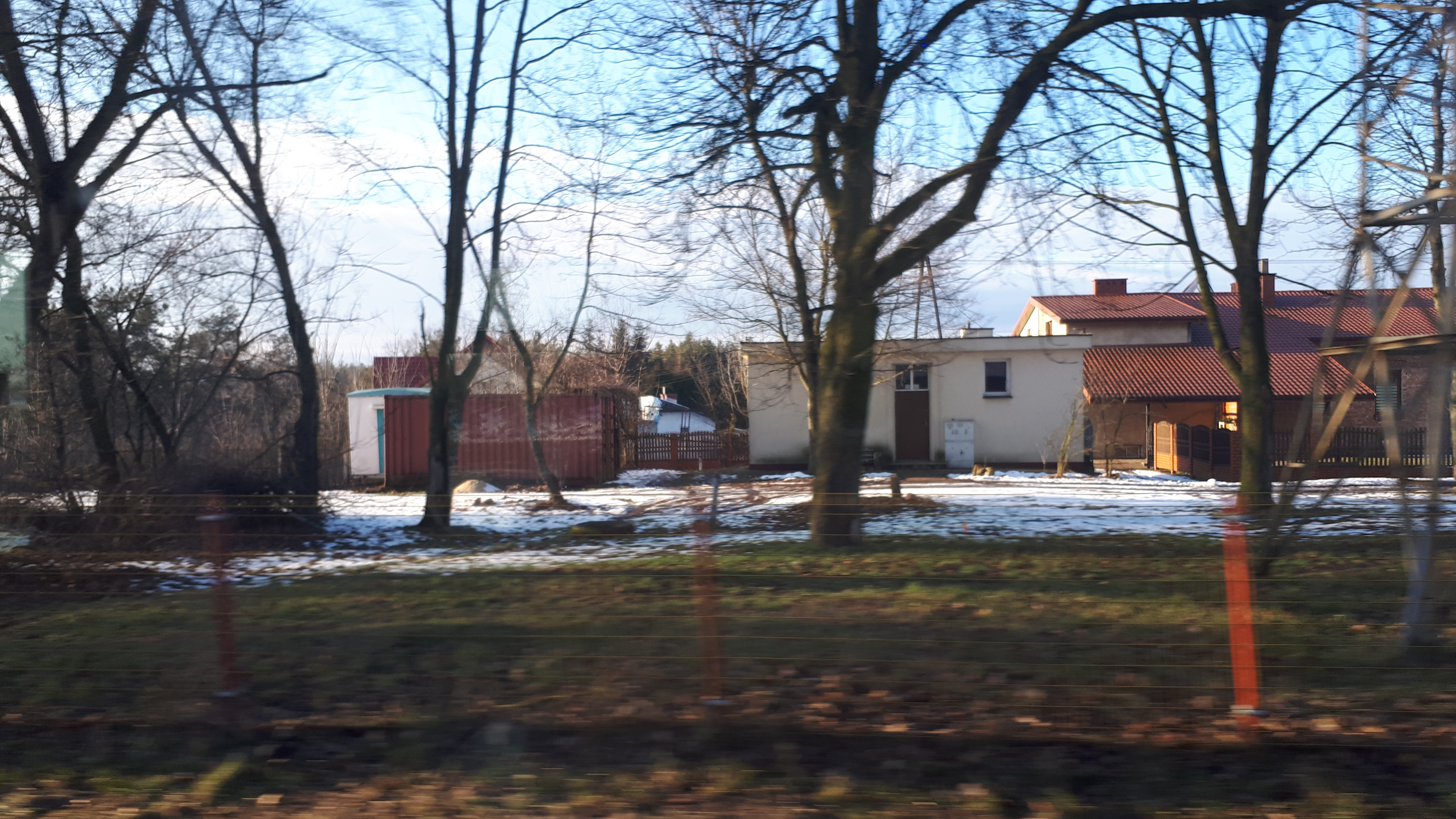

- Location within Poland
- Coordinates: 51°55′15″N 20°0′59″E
- Country: Poland
- Voivodeship: Łódź
- County: Skierniewice
- Gmina: Godzianów
- Population: 511

Płyćwia (Polish pronunciation: [ˈpwɨt͡ɕfja]) is a village in the administrative district of Gmina Godzianów, within Skierniewice County, Łódź Voivodeship, in central Poland.
