= Chlebów =

Chlebów may refer to the following places:

- Chlebów, Greater Poland Voivodeship (west-central Poland)
- Chlebów, Łódź Voivodeship (central Poland)
- Chlebów, Lubusz Voivodeship (west Poland)
