= Prandotów =

- Village
- Location within Poland
- Coordinates: 51°55′38″N 20°14′21″E
- Country: Poland
- Voivodeship: Łódź
- County: Skierniewice
- Gmina: Nowy Kawęczyn

Prandotów [pranˈdɔtuf] is a village in the administrative district of Gmina Nowy Kawęczyn, within Skierniewice County, Łódź Voivodeship, in central Poland.
