= Retniowiec =

- Village
- Location within Poland
- Coordinates: 51°56′N 19°57′E
- Country: Poland
- Voivodeship: Łódź
- County: Skierniewice
- Gmina: Lipce Reymontowskie

Retniowiec [rɛtˈɲɔvjɛt͡s] is a village in the administrative district of Gmina Lipce Reymontowskie, within Skierniewice County, Łódź Voivodeship, in central Poland.
