= Wysokienice =

- Village
- Location within Poland
- Coordinates: 51°48′N 20°8′E
- Country: Poland
- Voivodeship: Łódź
- County: Skierniewice
- Gmina: Głuchów
- Population: 830

Wysokienice [vɨsɔkʲɛˈnit͡sɛ] is a village in the administrative district of Gmina Głuchów, within Skierniewice County, Łódź Voivodeship, in central Poland.
