= Raducz =

- Village
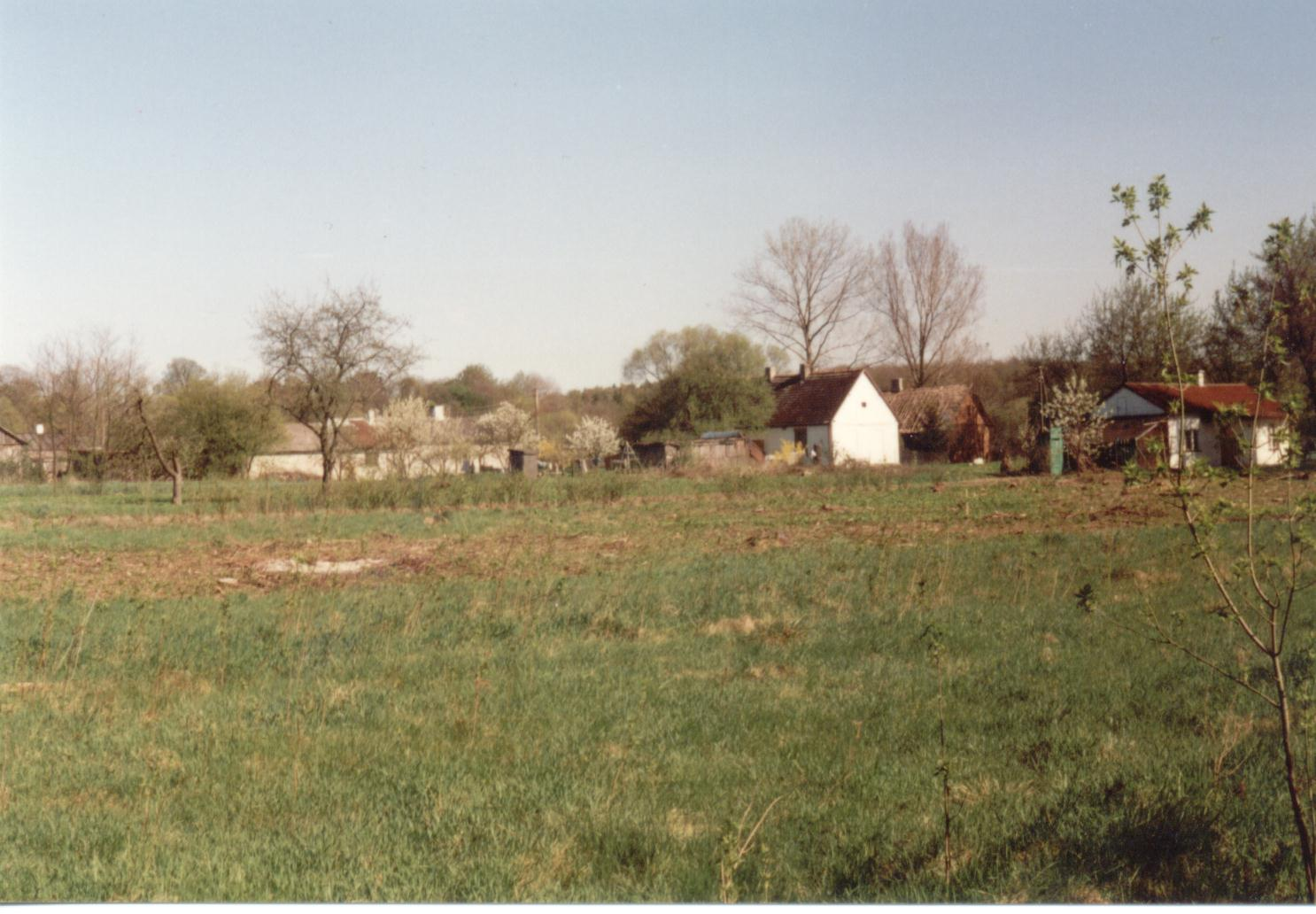

- Location within Poland
- Coordinates: 51°51′37″N 20°18′28″E
- Country: Poland
- Voivodeship: Łódź
- County: Skierniewice
- Gmina: Nowy Kawęczyn
- Elevation: 140 m (460 ft)
- Population: 30

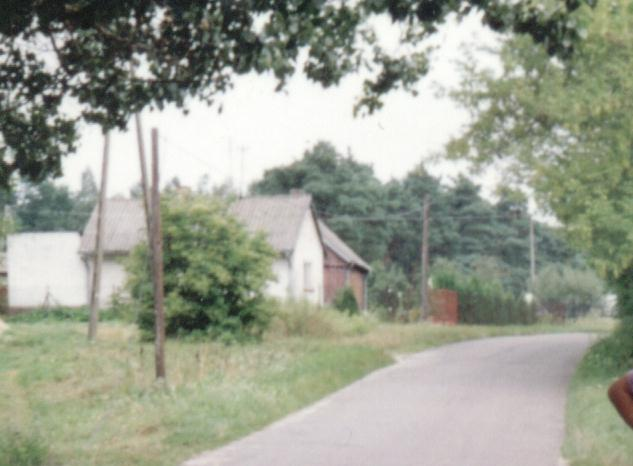
Houses in Raducz

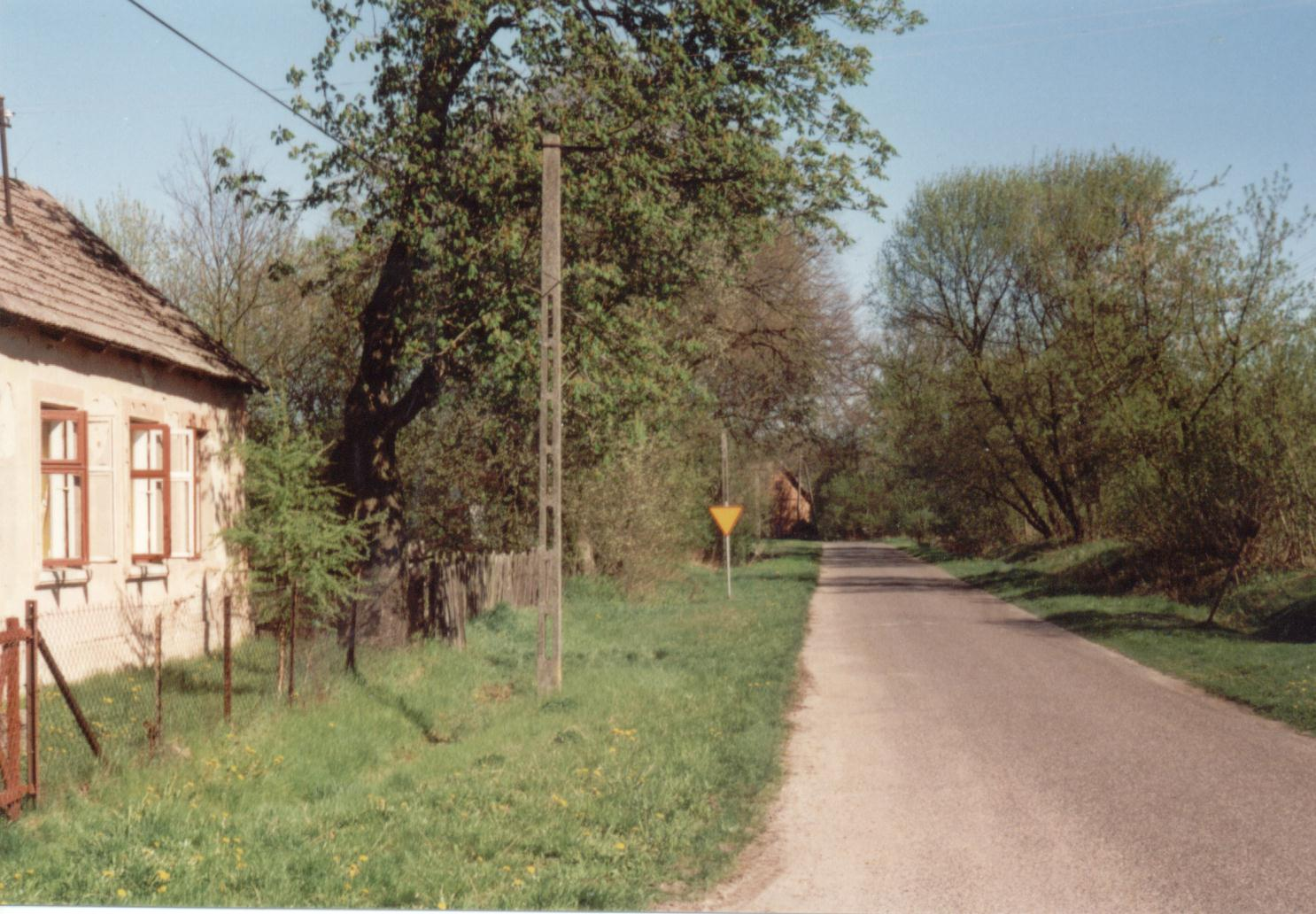
Street in Raducz

Raducz [ˈradut͡ʂ] is a village in the administrative district of Gmina Nowy Kawęczyn, within Skierniewice County, Łódź Voivodeship, in central Poland.

In 2004 the village had a population of 30.
