= Balcerów =

- Village
- Location within Poland
- Coordinates: 51°55′N 20°9′E
- Country: Poland
- Voivodeship: Łódź
- County: Skierniewice
- Gmina: Skierniewice

Balcerów [balˈt͡sɛruf] is a village in the administrative district of Gmina Skierniewice, within Skierniewice County, Łódź Voivodeship, in central Poland.
