= Janisławice, Łódź Voivodeship =

Janisławice
- Village
- Location within Poland
- Coordinates: 51°50′44″N 20°3′18″E
- Country: Poland
- Voivodeship: Łódź
- County: Skierniewice
- Gmina: Głuchów

Janisławice [janiswaˈvit͡sɛ] is a village in the administrative district of Gmina Głuchów, within Skierniewice County, Łódź Voivodeship, in central Poland.
