= Lnisno =

- Village
- Location within Poland
- Coordinates: 51°51′17″N 20°5′52″E
- Country: Poland
- Voivodeship: Łódź
- County: Skierniewice
- Gmina: Godzianów
- Population: 407

Lnisno [ˈlnisnɔ] is a village in the administrative district of Gmina Godzianów, within Skierniewice County, Łódź Voivodeship, in central Poland.
