= Budy Trzcińskie =

Village in Gmina Nowy Kawęczyn, Poland

- Village
- Location within Poland
- Coordinates: 51°54′51″N 20°13′18″E
- Country: Poland
- Voivodeship: Łódź
- County: Skierniewice
- Gmina: Nowy Kawęczyn

Budy Trzcińskie [ˈbudɨ ˈtʂt͡ɕiɲskʲɛ] is a village in the administrative district of Gmina Nowy Kawęczyn, within Skierniewice County, Łódź Voivodeship, in central Poland.
