= Franciszkany =

- Village
- Location within Poland
- Coordinates: 51°54′N 20°13′E
- Country: Poland
- Voivodeship: Łódź
- County: Skierniewice
- Gmina: Nowy Kawęczyn

Franciszkany [frant͡ɕiʂˈkanɨ] is a village in the administrative district of Gmina Nowy Kawęczyn, within Skierniewice County, Łódź Voivodeship, in central Poland.
