= Nowy Ludwików =

- Village
- Location within Poland
- Coordinates: 51°53′32″N 20°5′43″E
- Country: Poland
- Voivodeship: Łódź
- County: Skierniewice
- Gmina: Skierniewice

Nowy Ludwików [ˈnɔvɨ ludˈvikuf] is a village in the administrative district of Gmina Skierniewice, within Skierniewice County, Łódź Voivodeship, in central Poland.
