= Krosnowa =

- Village
- Location within Poland
- Coordinates: 51°51′43″N 19°55′43″E
- Country: Poland
- Voivodeship: Łódź
- County: Skierniewice
- Gmina: Słupia

Krosnowa [krɔsˈnɔva] is a village in the administrative district of Gmina Słupia, within Skierniewice County, Łódź Voivodeship, in central Poland.
