= Wólka Krosnowska =

- Village
- Location within Poland
- Coordinates: 51°53′N 19°54′E
- Country: Poland
- Voivodeship: Łódź
- County: Skierniewice
- Gmina: Lipce Reymontowskie

Wólka Krosnowska [ˈvulka krɔsˈnɔfska] is a village in the administrative district of Gmina Lipce Reymontowskie, within Skierniewice County, Łódź Voivodeship, in central Poland.
