= Miedniewice, Łódź Voivodeship =

Miedniewice
- Village
- Location within Poland
- Coordinates: 51°57′53″N 20°12′12″E
- Country: Poland
- Voivodeship: Łódź
- County: Skierniewice
- Gmina: Skierniewice
- Population: 790

Miedniewice [mjɛdɲɛˈvit͡sɛ] is a village in the administrative district of Gmina Skierniewice, within Skierniewice County, Łódź Voivodeship, in central Poland.
