= Mszadla, Łódź Voivodeship =

Mszadla
- Village
- Location within Poland
- Coordinates: 51°53′58″N 19°53′54″E
- Country: Poland
- Voivodeship: Łódź
- County: Skierniewice
- Gmina: Lipce Reymontowskie
- Time zone: UTC+1 (CET)
  - Summer (DST): UTC+2 (CEST)
- Postal code: 96-127
- Vehicle registration: ESK

Mszadla [ˈmʂadla] is a village in the administrative district of Gmina Lipce Reymontowskie, within Skierniewice County, Łódź Voivodeship, in central Poland.

== History ==
In the interwar period, it was administratively located in the Skierniewice County in the Warsaw Voivodeship. According to the 1921 census, the village had a population of 715, entirely Polish by nationality and Roman Catholic by confession.

During the German invasion of Poland at the start of World War II, German forces on 10 September 1939 murdered 153 Poles in the village (see Nazi crimes against the Polish nation). The victims were local farmers, refugees, four children as young as three years old.
