= Kawęczyn, Skierniewice County =

Kawęczyn
- Village
- Location within Poland
- Coordinates: 51°54′2″N 20°0′31″E
- Country: Poland
- Voivodeship: Łódź
- County: Skierniewice
- Gmina: Godzianów
- Population: 246

Kawęczyn [kaˈvɛnt͡ʂɨn] is a village in the administrative district of Gmina Godzianów, within Skierniewice County, Łódź Voivodeship, in central Poland.
