= Miedniewice-Topola =

- Village
- Location within Poland
- Coordinates: 51°58′23″N 20°11′41″E
- Country: Poland
- Voivodeship: Łódź
- County: Skierniewice
- Gmina: Skierniewice
- Population: 153

Miedniewice-Topola [mjɛdɲɛˈvit͡sɛ tɔˈpɔla] is a village in the administrative district of Gmina Skierniewice, within Skierniewice County, Łódź Voivodeship, in central Poland.
