= Modła =

Modła may refer to the following places in Poland:

- Modła, Bolesławiec County in Lower Silesian Voivodeship (south-west Poland)
- Modła, Głogów County in Lower Silesian Voivodeship (south-west Poland)
- Modła, Łódź Voivodeship (central Poland)
- Modła, Ciechanów County in Masovian Voivodeship (east-central Poland)
- Modła, Mława County in Masovian Voivodeship (east-central Poland)
- Modła, Kalisz County in Greater Poland Voivodeship (west-central Poland)
- Modła, Konin County in Greater Poland Voivodeship (west-central Poland)
- Modła, Pomeranian Voivodeship (north Poland)
