= Jacochów =

- Village
- Location within Poland
- Coordinates: 51°59′13″N 19°58′53″E
- Country: Poland
- Voivodeship: Łódź
- County: Skierniewice
- Gmina: Maków

Jacochów [jaˈt͡sɔxuf] is a village in the administrative district of Gmina Maków, within Skierniewice County, Łódź Voivodeship, in central Poland.
