= Wólka-Nazdroje =

- Village
- Location within Poland
- Coordinates: 51°52′32″N 19°54′8″E
- Country: Poland
- Voivodeship: Łódź
- County: Skierniewice
- Gmina: Słupia

Wólka-Nazdroje [ˈvulka nazˈdrɔjɛ] is a village in the administrative district of Gmina Słupia, within Skierniewice County, Łódź Voivodeship, in central Poland.
