= Nowe Rowiska =

- Village
- Location within Poland
- Coordinates: 51°53′56″N 20°7′7″E
- Country: Poland
- Voivodeship: Łódź
- County: Skierniewice
- Gmina: Skierniewice

Nowe Rowiska [ˈnɔvɛ rɔˈviska] is a village in the administrative district of Gmina Skierniewice, within Skierniewice County, Łódź Voivodeship, in central Poland.
