= Budy Grabskie =

- Village
- Location within Poland
- Coordinates: 52°0′45″N 20°12′33″E
- Country: Poland
- Voivodeship: Łódź
- County: Skierniewice
- Gmina: Skierniewice

Budy Grabskie [ˈbudɨ ˈɡrapskʲɛ] is a village in the administrative district of Gmina Skierniewice, within Skierniewice County, Łódź Voivodeship, in central Poland.
