= Pokora =

Pokora is a Polish word meaning humility.

Pokora may also refer to:

== Places ==
- Słupia-Pokora, village in the administrative district of Gmina Słupia, within Skierniewice County, Łódź Voivodeship, in central Poland

== People ==
- M. Pokora (born 1985), real name Matthieu Tota, French singer, songwriter, dancer
- Roman Pokora (1948-2021), Soviet Ukrainian football player
- Timoteus Pokora (1928–1985), Czech sinologist
- Wojciech Pokora (1934–2018), Polish film and television actor
