= Adamów, Skierniewice County =

Adamów
- Village
- Location within Poland
- Coordinates: 51°54′59″N 20°14′14″E
- Country: Poland
- Voivodeship: Łódź
- County: Skierniewice
- Gmina: Nowy Kawęczyn

Adamów [aˈdamuf] is a village in the administrative district of Gmina Nowy Kawęczyn, within Skierniewice County, Łódź Voivodeship, in central Poland.
