= Nowy Dwór-Parcela =

- Village
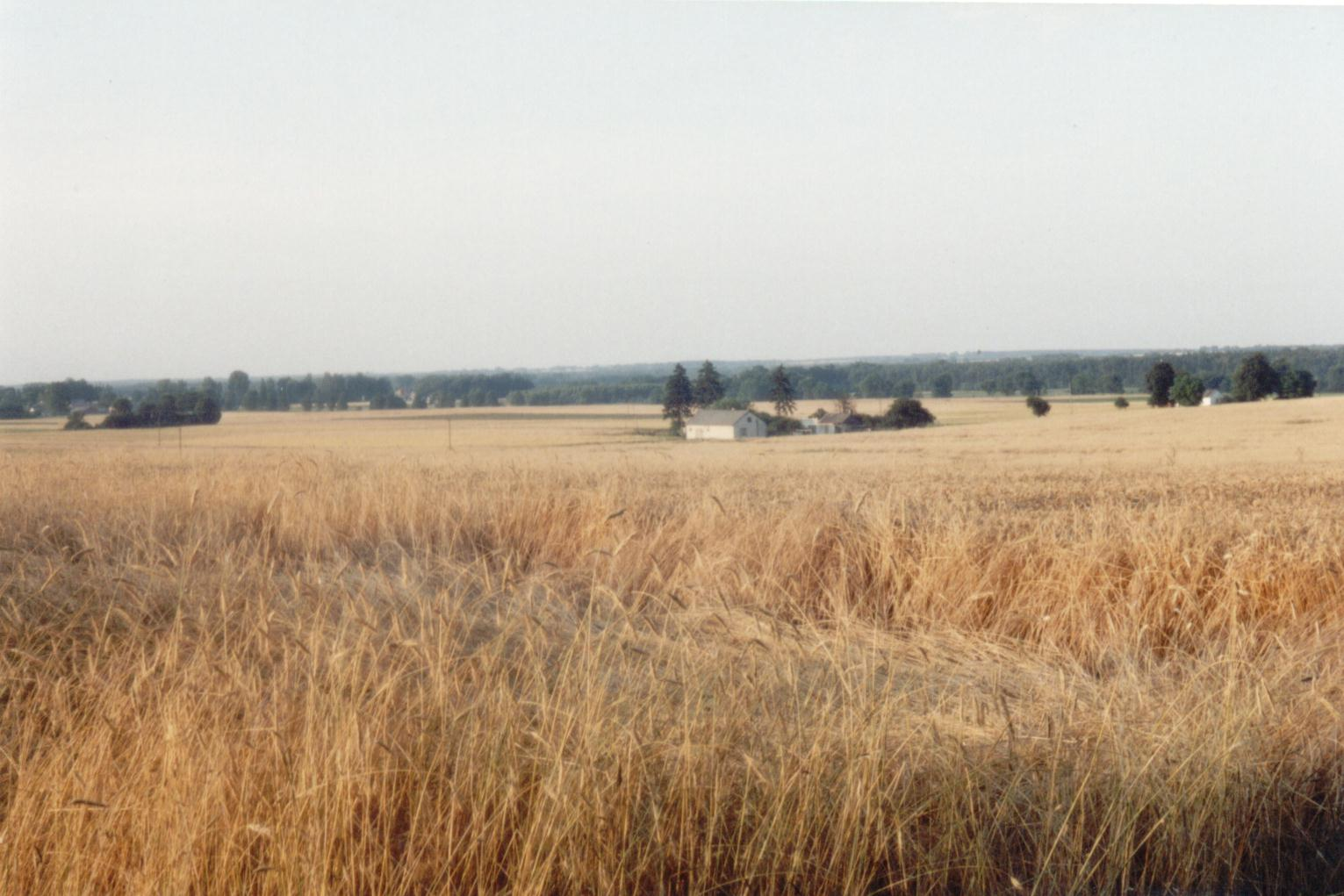
- View of a fragment of the village of Nowy Dwór-Parcela

- Location within Poland
- Coordinates: 51°52′08″N 20°15′43″E
- Country: Poland
- Voivodeship: Łódź
- County: Skierniewice
- Gmina: Nowy Kawęczyn

Nowy Dwór-Parcela [ˈnɔvɨ ˈdvur parˈt͡sɛla] is a village in the administrative district of Gmina Nowy Kawęczyn, within Skierniewice County, Łódź Voivodeship, in central Poland.
