= Stare Rowiska =

- Village
- Location within Poland
- Coordinates: 51°54′31″N 20°5′54″E
- Country: Poland
- Voivodeship: Łódź
- County: Skierniewice
- Gmina: Skierniewice

Stare Rowiska [ˈstarɛ rɔˈviska] is a village in the administrative district of Gmina Skierniewice, within Skierniewice County, Łódź Voivodeship, in central Poland.
