= Rawiczów =

- Village
- Location within Poland
- Coordinates: 51°55′N 20°12′E
- Country: Poland
- Voivodeship: Łódź
- County: Skierniewice
- Gmina: Nowy Kawęczyn

Rawiczów [raˈvit͡ʂuf] is a village in the administrative district of Gmina Nowy Kawęczyn, within Skierniewice County, Łódź Voivodeship, in central Poland.
