= Mokra Prawa =

- Village
- Location within Poland
- Coordinates: 51°59′16″N 20°6′47″E
- Country: Poland
- Voivodeship: Łódź
- County: Skierniewice
- Gmina: Skierniewice
- Population: 950

Mokra Prawa [ˈmɔkra ˈprava] is a village in the administrative district of Gmina Skierniewice, within Skierniewice County, Łódź Voivodeship, in central Poland.
