= Suliszew =

- Village
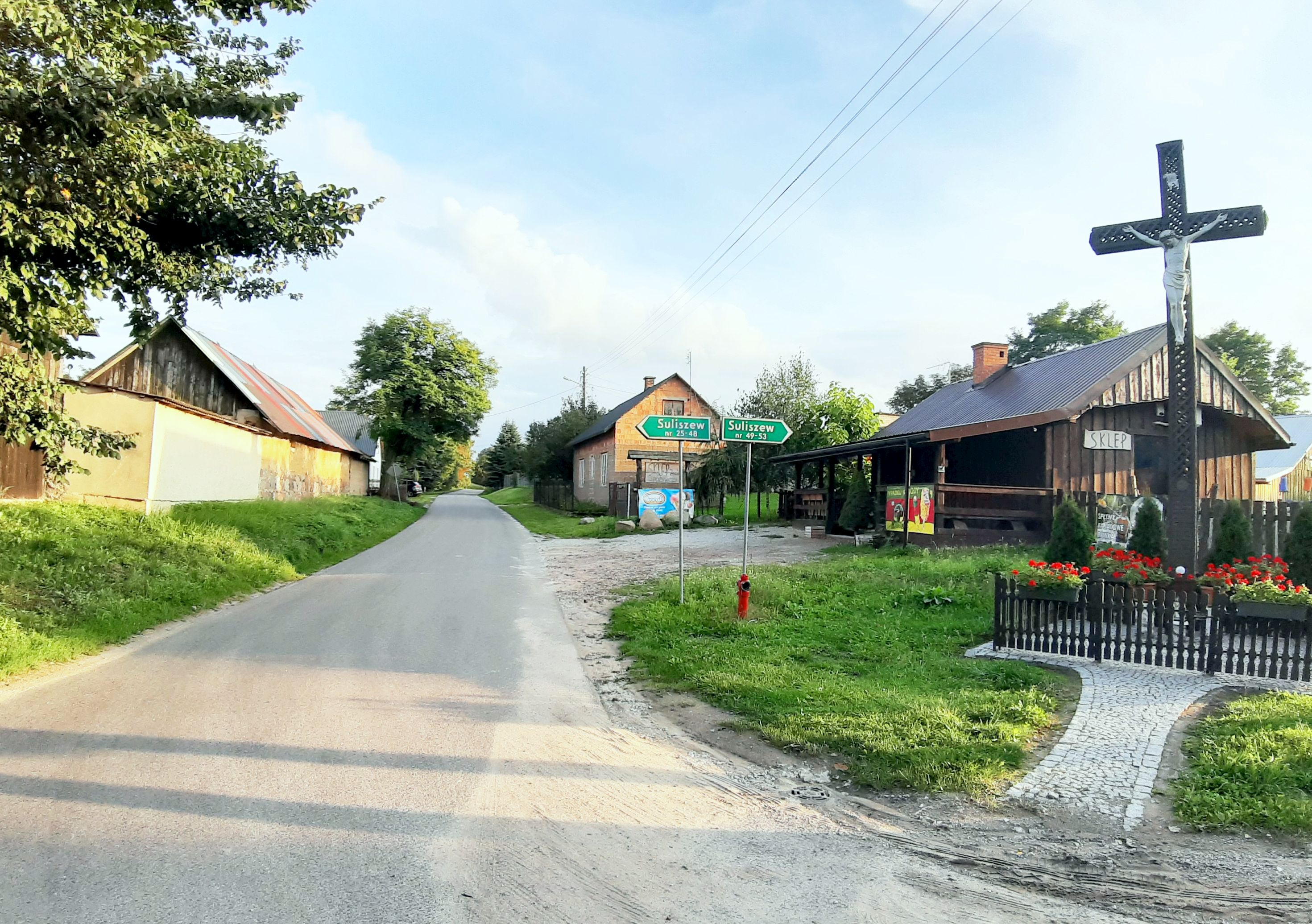

- Location within Poland
- Coordinates: 51°56′N 20°17′E
- Country: Poland
- Voivodeship: Łódź
- County: Skierniewice
- Gmina: Nowy Kawęczyn
- Population (approx.): 150

Suliszew [suˈliʂɛf] is a village in the administrative district of Gmina Nowy Kawęczyn, within Skierniewice County, Łódź Voivodeship, in central Poland.

The village has an approximate population of 150.
