= Rzeczków, Skierniewice County =

Rzeczków
- Village
- Location within Poland
- Coordinates: 51°52′50″N 20°9′23″E
- Country: Poland
- Voivodeship: Łódź
- County: Skierniewice
- Gmina: Skierniewice

Rzeczków [ˈʐɛt͡ʂkuf] is a village in the administrative district of Gmina Skierniewice, within Skierniewice County, Łódź Voivodeship, in central Poland.
