= Mokra, Łódź Voivodeship =

Mokra
- Village
- Location within Poland
- Coordinates: 51°58′43″N 20°6′2″E
- Country: Poland
- Voivodeship: Łódź
- County: Skierniewice
- Gmina: Skierniewice
- Population: 149

Mokra [ˈmɔkra] is a village in the administrative district of Gmina Skierniewice, within Skierniewice County, Łódź Voivodeship, in central Poland.
