= Białynin =

- Village
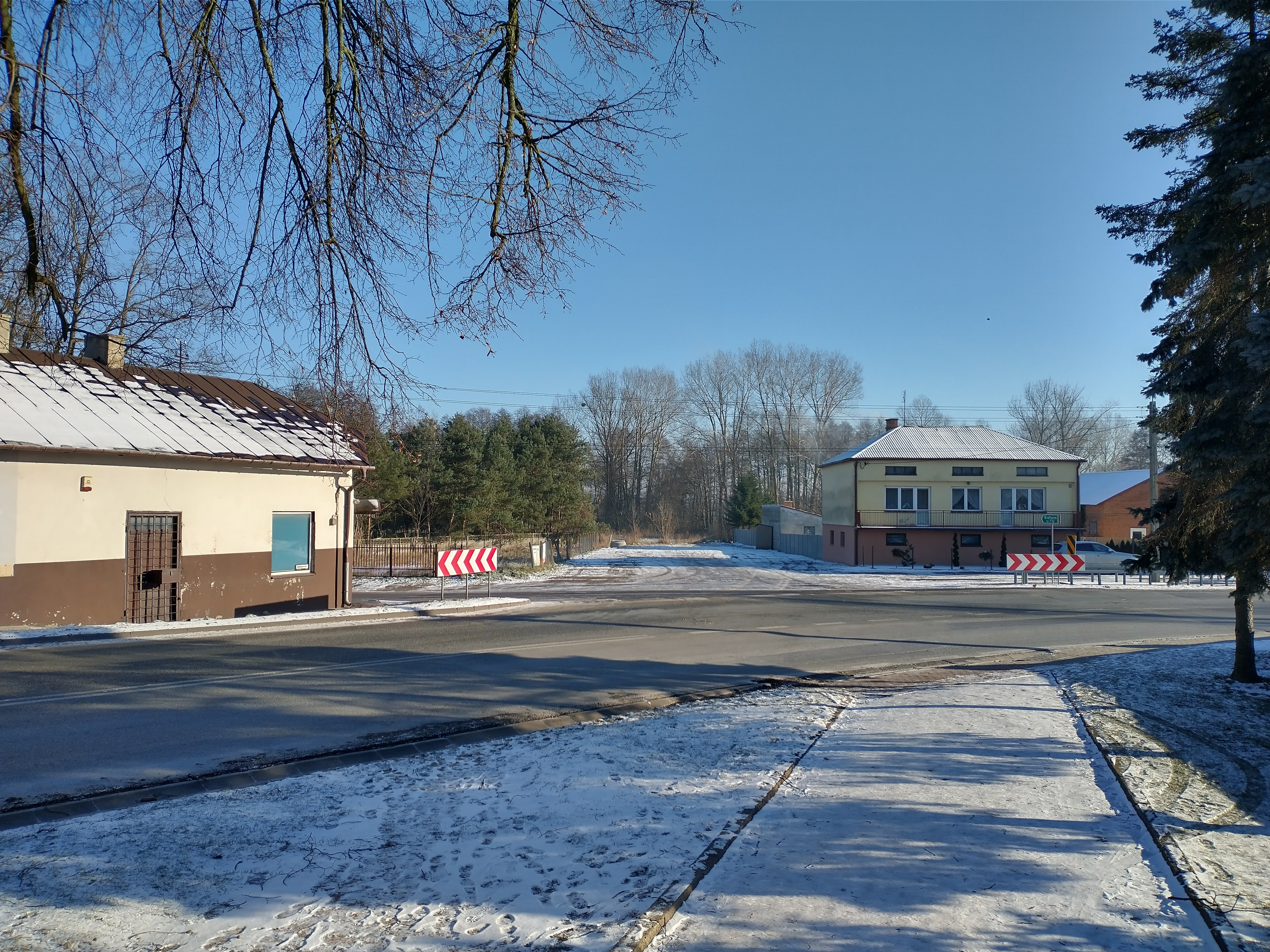

- Location within Poland
- Coordinates: 51°48′27″N 20°0′49″E
- Country: Poland
- Voivodeship: Łódź
- County: Skierniewice
- Gmina: Głuchów
- Population: 330

Białynin [bjaˈwɨnin] is a village in the administrative district of Gmina Głuchów, within Skierniewice County, Łódź Voivodeship, in central Poland.

The village has a population of 330.
