= Pamiętna =

- Village
- Location within Poland
- Coordinates: 51°56′N 20°14′E
- Country: Poland
- Voivodeship: Łódź
- County: Skierniewice
- Gmina: Skierniewice

Pamiętna [paˈmjɛntna] is a village in the administrative district of Gmina Skierniewice, within Skierniewice County, Łódź Voivodeship, in central Poland.
