= Białynin-Południe =

- Village
- Location within Poland
- Coordinates: 51°47′57″N 20°0′31″E
- Country: Poland
- Voivodeship: Łódź
- County: Skierniewice
- Gmina: Głuchów

Białynin-Południe [bjaˈwɨnin pɔˈwudɲɛ] is a village in the administrative district of Gmina Głuchów, within Skierniewice County, Łódź Voivodeship, in central Poland.
