= Nowy Dwór, Łódź Voivodeship =

Nowy Dwór
- Village
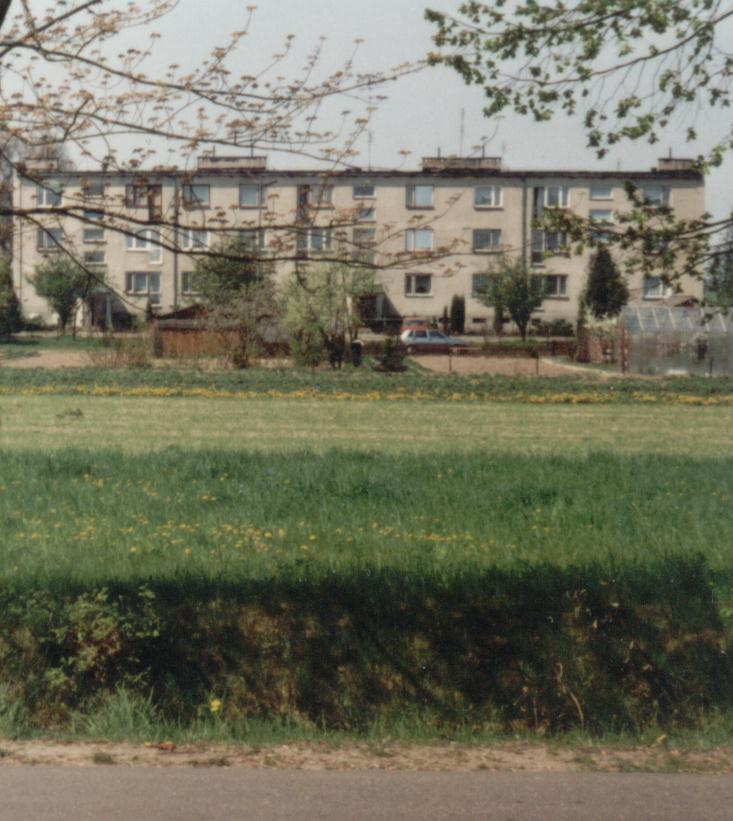

- Location within Poland
- Coordinates: 51°51′35″N 20°16′46″E
- Country: Poland
- Voivodeship: Łódź
- County: Skierniewice
- Gmina: Nowy Kawęczyn

Nowy Dwór [ˈnɔvɨ ˈdvur] is a village in the administrative district of Gmina Nowy Kawęczyn, within Skierniewice County, Łódź Voivodeship, in central Poland.
