= Pruszków, Skierniewice County =

Pruszków
- Village
- Location within Poland
- Coordinates: 51°53′28″N 20°8′58″E
- Country: Poland
- Voivodeship: Łódź
- County: Skierniewice
- Gmina: Skierniewice

Pruszków [ˈpruʂkuf] is a village in the administrative district of Gmina Skierniewice, within Skierniewice County, Łódź Voivodeship, in central Poland.
