= Psary, Skierniewice County =

Psary
- Village
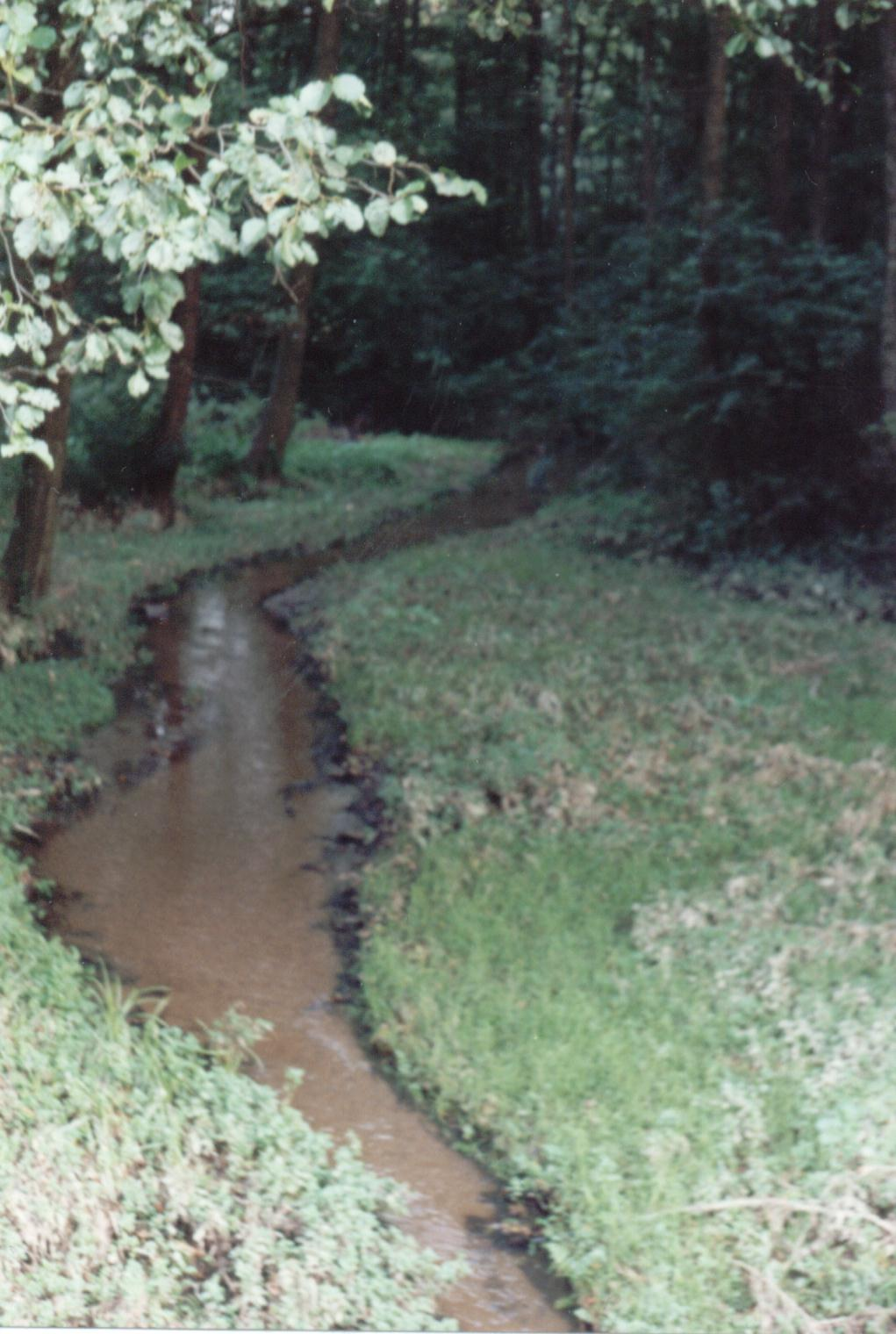

- Location within Poland
- Coordinates: 51°52′36″N 20°18′38″E
- Country: Poland
- Voivodeship: Łódź
- County: Skierniewice
- Gmina: Nowy Kawęczyn
- Population: 60

Psary [ˈpsarɨ] is a village in the administrative district of Gmina Nowy Kawęczyn, within Skierniewice County, Łódź Voivodeship, in central Poland.
