= Stara Rawa =

- Village
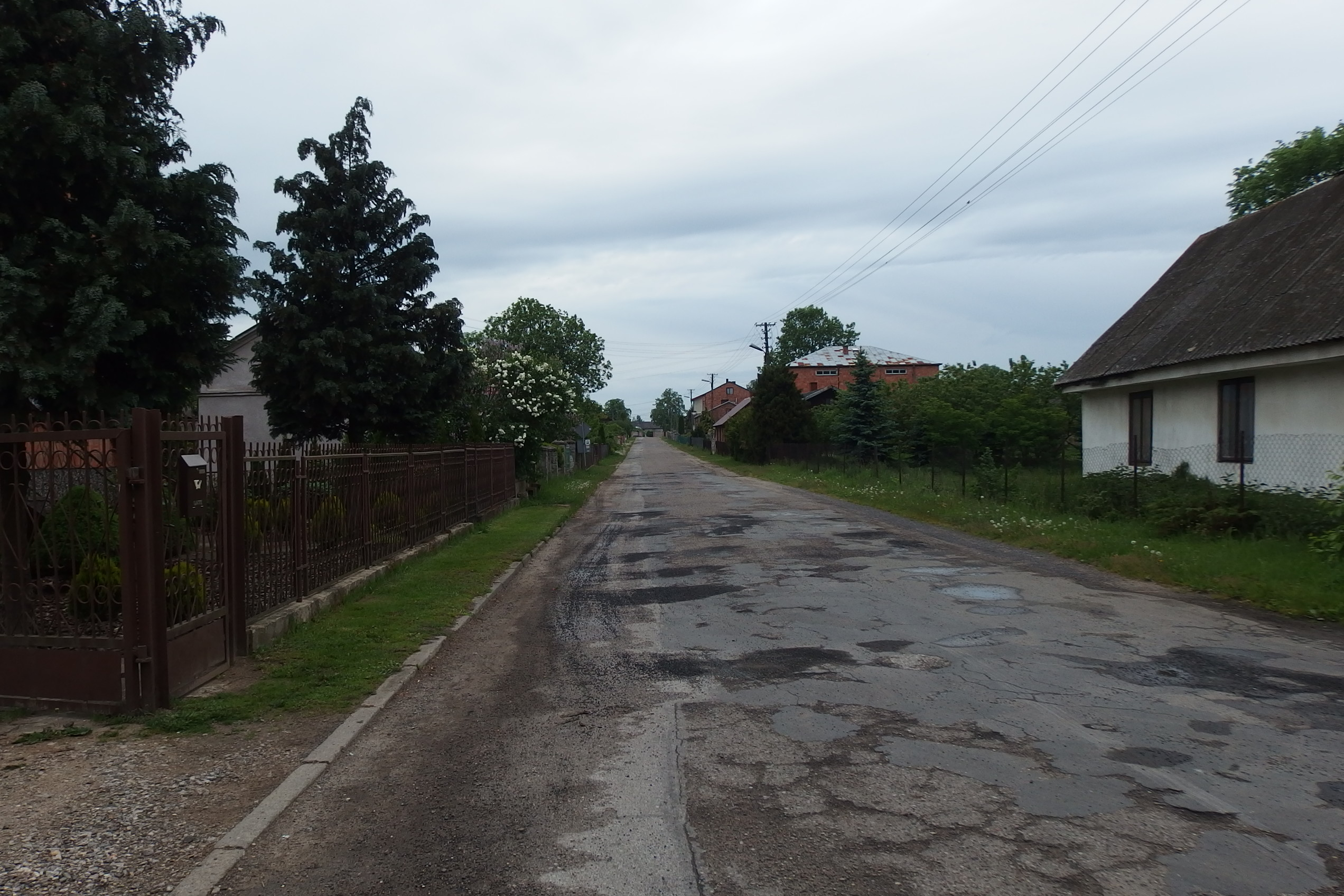

- Location within Poland
- Coordinates: 51°53′N 20°17′E
- Country: Poland
- Voivodeship: Łódź
- County: Skierniewice
- Gmina: Nowy Kawęczyn
- Population (approx.): 280

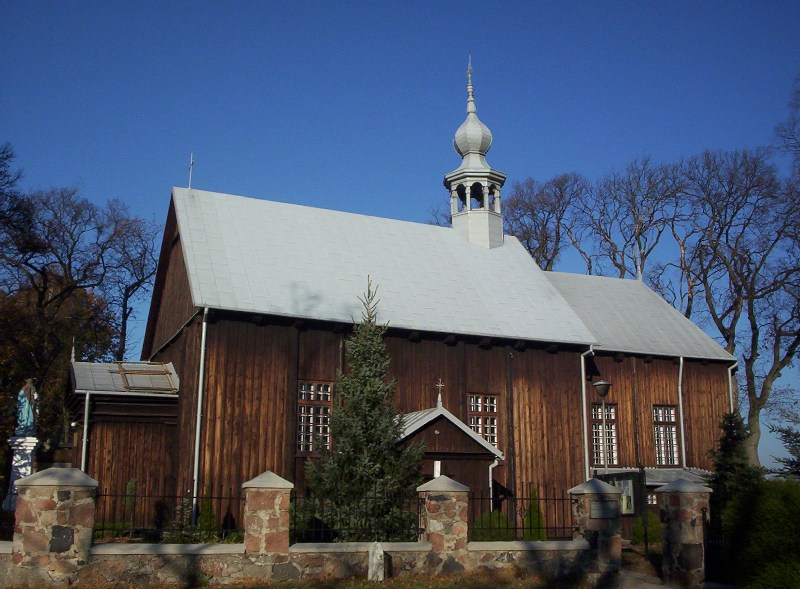
Church in Stara Rawa (1731)

Stara Rawa [ˈstara ˈrava] is a village in the administrative district of Gmina Nowy Kawęczyn, within Skierniewice County, Łódź Voivodeship, in central Poland.

In 2004 the village had a population of 280.

The village, as the town of Rawa, was founded probably in the 11th century.
