= Wola Drzewiecka =

- Village
- Location within Poland
- Coordinates: 51°55′N 19°59′E
- Country: Poland
- Voivodeship: Łódź
- County: Skierniewice
- Gmina: Lipce Reymontowskie

Wola Drzewiecka [ˈvɔla dʐɛˈvjɛt͡ska] is a village in the administrative district of Gmina Lipce Reymontowskie, within Skierniewice County, Łódź Voivodeship, in central Poland.
