= Nowy Rzędków =

- Village
- Location within Poland
- Coordinates: 51°53′32″N 20°11′8″E
- Country: Poland
- Voivodeship: Łódź
- County: Skierniewice
- Gmina: Nowy Kawęczyn

Nowy Rzędków [ˈnɔvɨ ˈʐɛntkuf] is a village in the administrative district of Gmina Nowy Kawęczyn, within Skierniewice County, Łódź Voivodeship, in central Poland.
