= Dąbrowice, Gmina Skierniewice =

Dąbrowice
- Village
- Location within Poland
- Coordinates: 51°55′24″N 20°05′58″E
- Country: Poland
- Voivodeship: Łódź
- County: Skierniewice
- Gmina: Skierniewice
- Population: 79

Dąbrowice [dɔmbrɔˈvit͡sɛ] is a village in the administrative district of Gmina Skierniewice, within Skierniewice County, Łódź Voivodeship, in central Poland.
