= Słupia-Folwark =

- Village
- Location within Poland
- Coordinates: 51°51′01″N 19°58′50″E
- Country: Poland
- Voivodeship: Łódź
- County: Skierniewice
- Gmina: Słupia

Słupia-Folwark [ˈswupja ˈfɔlvark] is a village in the administrative district of Gmina Słupia, within Skierniewice County, Łódź Voivodeship, in central Poland.
