= Ruda, Skierniewice County =

Ruda
- Village
- Location within Poland
- Coordinates: 51°59′N 20°13′E
- Country: Poland
- Voivodeship: Łódź
- County: Skierniewice
- Gmina: Skierniewice

Ruda [ˈruda] is a village in the administrative district of Gmina Skierniewice, within Skierniewice County, Łódź Voivodeship, in central Poland.
