= Reczul =

- Village
- Location within Poland
- Coordinates: 51°51′N 20°4′E
- Country: Poland
- Voivodeship: Łódź
- County: Skierniewice
- Gmina: Głuchów

Reczul [ˈrɛt͡ʂul] is a village in the administrative district of Gmina Głuchów, within Skierniewice County, Łódź Voivodeship, in central Poland.
