= Kawęczyn B =

- Village
- Location within Poland
- Coordinates: 51°52′43″N 20°13′9″E
- Country: Poland
- Voivodeship: Łódź
- County: Skierniewice
- Gmina: Nowy Kawęczyn

Kawęczyn B is a village in the administrative district of Gmina Nowy Kawęczyn, within Skierniewice County, Łódź Voivodeship, in central Poland.
