= Winna Góra =

Winna Góra may refer to the following places in Poland:

- Winna Góra, Lower Silesian Voivodeship (south-west Poland)
- Winna Góra, Łódź Voivodeship (central Poland)
- Winna Góra, Greater Poland Voivodeship (west-central Poland)
