= Maków-Kolonia =

- Village
- Location within Poland
- Coordinates: 51°57′35″N 20°3′11″E
- Country: Poland
- Voivodeship: Łódź
- County: Skierniewice
- Gmina: Maków

Maków-Kolonia [ˈmakuf kɔˈlɔɲa] is a village in the administrative district of Gmina Maków, within Skierniewice County, Łódź Voivodeship, in central Poland.

== Curiosities ==
In 2009 a resident of the village had 12.3 per mille of alcohol in blood.
