= Kochanów, Skierniewice County =

Kochanów
- Village
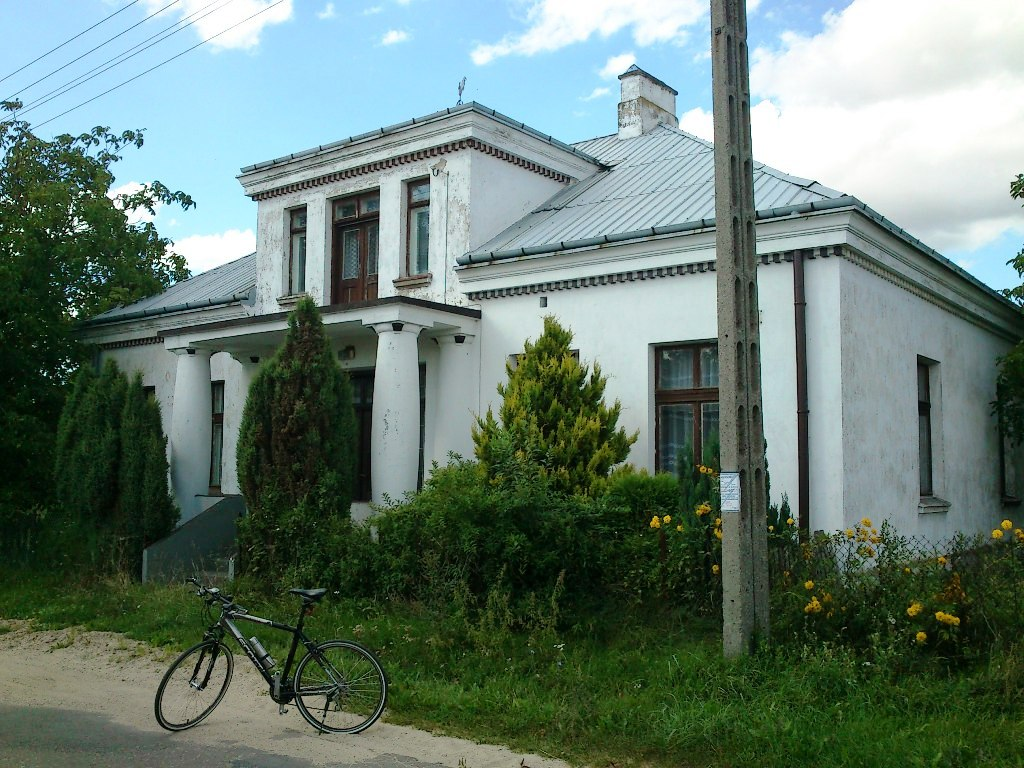

- Location within Poland
- Coordinates: 51°46′29″N 20°0′54″E
- Country: Poland
- Voivodeship: Łódź
- County: Skierniewice
- Gmina: Głuchów

Kochanów [kɔˈxanuf] (German Erdmannsweiler) is a village in the administrative district of Gmina Głuchów, within Skierniewice County, Łódź Voivodeship, in central Poland.
