= Brzozów, Skierniewice County =

Brzozów
- Village
- Location within Poland
- Coordinates: 51°52′34″N 20°5′48″E
- Country: Poland
- Voivodeship: Łódź
- County: Skierniewice
- Gmina: Skierniewice

Brzozów [ˈbʐɔzuf] is a village in the administrative district of Gmina Skierniewice, within Skierniewice County, Łódź Voivodeship, in central Poland.
