= Wola Wysoka =

- Village
- Location within Poland
- Coordinates: 51°52′N 20°7′E
- Country: Poland
- Voivodeship: Łódź
- County: Skierniewice
- Gmina: Skierniewice

Wola Wysoka [ˈvɔla vɨˈsɔka] is a village in the administrative district of Gmina Skierniewice, within Skierniewice County, Łódź Voivodeship, in central Poland.
