= Celigów =

- Village
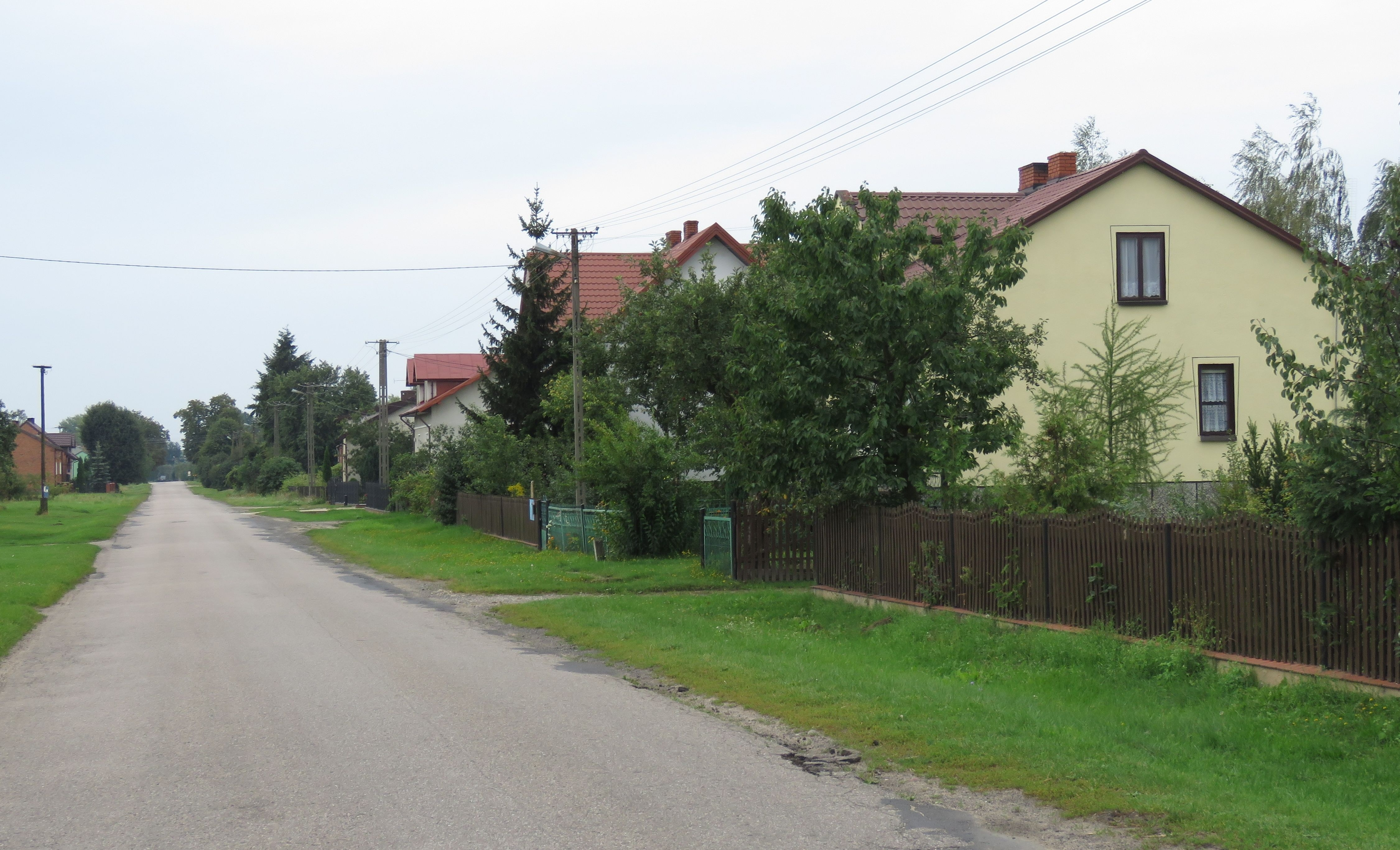

- Location within Poland
- Coordinates: 51°49′N 20°6′E
- Country: Poland
- Voivodeship: Łódź
- County: Skierniewice
- Gmina: Głuchów

Celigów [t͡sɛˈliɡuf] is a village in the administrative district of Gmina Głuchów, within Skierniewice County, Łódź Voivodeship, in central Poland.
