= Samice =

- Village
- Location within Poland
- Coordinates: 51°57′N 20°15′E
- Country: Poland
- Voivodeship: Łódź
- County: Skierniewice
- Gmina: Skierniewice

Samice [saˈmit͡sɛ] is a village in the administrative district of Gmina Skierniewice, within Skierniewice County, Łódź Voivodeship, in central Poland.
