= Podfranciszkany =

- Village
- Location within Poland
- Coordinates: 51°54′5″N 20°12′6″E
- Country: Poland
- Voivodeship: Łódź
- County: Skierniewice
- Gmina: Nowy Kawęczyn
- Population: 80

Podfranciszkany [pɔtfrant͡ɕiʂˈkanɨ] is a village in the administrative district of Gmina Nowy Kawęczyn, within Skierniewice County, Łódź Voivodeship, in central Poland.
