= Pszczonów =

- Village
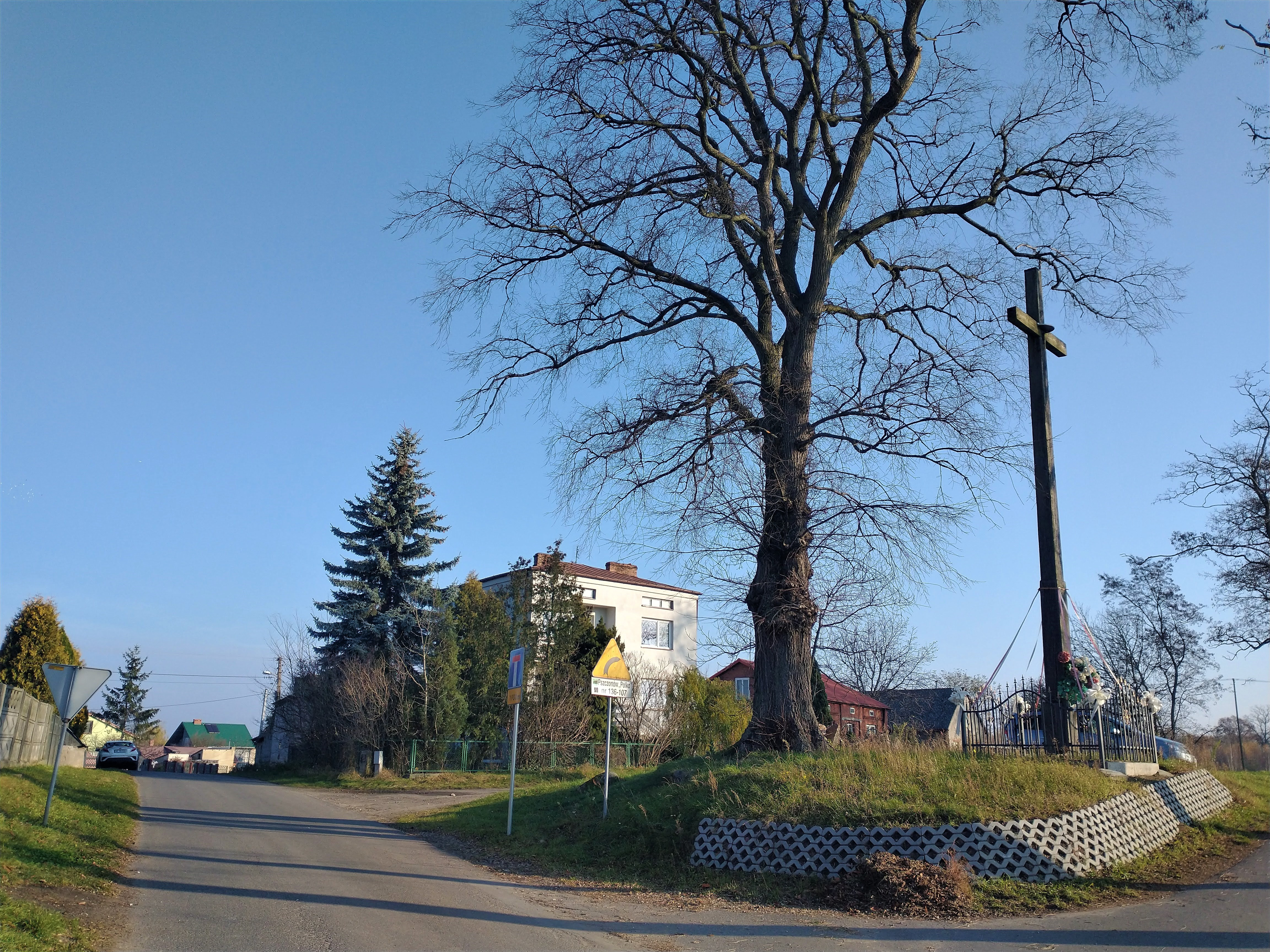

- Location within Poland
- Coordinates: 51°58′N 19°57′E
- Country: Poland
- Voivodeship: Łódź
- County: Skierniewice
- Gmina: Maków

Pszczonów [ˈpʂt͡ʂɔnuf] is a village in the administrative district of Gmina Maków, within Skierniewice County, Łódź Voivodeship, in central Poland.
