= Drzewce, Łódź Voivodeship =

Drzewce
- Village
- Location within Poland
- Coordinates: 51°53′37″N 19°58′50″E
- Country: Poland
- Voivodeship: Łódź
- County: Skierniewice
- Gmina: Lipce Reymontowskie

Drzewce [ˈdʐɛft͡sɛ] is a village in the administrative district of Gmina Lipce Reymontowskie, within Skierniewice County, Łódź Voivodeship, in central Poland.
