= Mokra Lewa =

- Village
- Location within Poland
- Coordinates: 51°58′25″N 20°5′15″E
- Country: Poland
- Voivodeship: Łódź
- County: Skierniewice
- Gmina: Skierniewice
- Population: 810

Mokra Lewa [ˈmɔkra ˈlɛva] is a village in the administrative district of Gmina Skierniewice, within Skierniewice County, Łódź Voivodeship, in central Poland.
