= Zalesie, Skierniewice County =

Zalesie
- Village
- Location within Poland
- Coordinates: 51°51′17″N 20°8′41″E
- Country: Poland
- Voivodeship: Łódź
- County: Skierniewice
- Gmina: Skierniewice

Zalesie [zaˈlɛɕɛ] is a village in the administrative district of Gmina Skierniewice, within Skierniewice County, Łódź Voivodeship, in central Poland.
