= Krężce =

- Village
- Location within Poland
- Coordinates: 51°56′1″N 20°4′45″E
- Country: Poland
- Voivodeship: Łódź
- County: Skierniewice
- Gmina: Maków
- Website: www.krezce.uk.pl

Krężce [ˈkrɛ̃ʂt͡sɛ] is a village in the administrative district of Gmina Maków, within Skierniewice County, Łódź Voivodeship, in central Poland.
