= Stary Rzędków =

- Village
- Location within Poland
- Coordinates: 51°52′55″N 20°10′14″E
- Country: Poland
- Voivodeship: Łódź
- County: Skierniewice
- Gmina: Nowy Kawęczyn

Stary Rzędków [ˈstarɨ ˈʐɛntkuf] is a village in the administrative district of Gmina Nowy Kawęczyn, within Skierniewice County, Łódź Voivodeship, in central Poland.
