= Józefatów, Skierniewice County =

Józefatów
- Village
- Location within Poland
- Coordinates: 51°53′12″N 20°8′25″E
- Country: Poland
- Voivodeship: Łódź
- County: Skierniewice
- Gmina: Skierniewice

Józefatów [juzɛˈfatuf] is a village in the administrative district of Gmina Skierniewice, within Skierniewice County, Łódź Voivodeship, in central Poland.
