= Prusy =

Prusy may refer to:

- Prusy, Aube, France
- Prusy, Bánovce nad Bebravou, Slovakia
- Prusy, Greater Poland Voivodeship (west-central Poland)
- Prusy, Lesser Poland Voivodeship (south Poland)
- Prusy, Łódź Voivodeship (central Poland)
- Prusy, Lower Silesian Voivodeship (south-west Poland)
- Prusy, Grójec County in Masovian Voivodeship (east-central Poland)
- Prusy, Łosice County in Masovian Voivodeship (east-central Poland)
- Prusy, Mińsk County in Masovian Voivodeship (east-central Poland)
- Prusy, Warsaw West County in Masovian Voivodeship (east-central Poland)
- Prusy, Busko County in Świętokrzyskie Voivodeship (south-central Poland)
- Prusy, Opatów County in Świętokrzyskie Voivodeship (south-central Poland)
- Prusy, Warmian-Masurian Voivodeship (north Poland)
- Prusy, the Polish name for Prussia
