= Wola Makowska =

- Village
- Location within Poland
- Coordinates: 51°59′N 20°3′E
- Country: Poland
- Voivodeship: Łódź
- County: Skierniewice
- Gmina: Maków

Wola Makowska [ˈvɔla maˈkɔfska] is a village in the administrative district of Gmina Maków, within Skierniewice County, Łódź Voivodeship, in central Poland.
