= Rzędków, Skierniewice County =

Rzędków
- Village
- Location within Poland
- Coordinates: 51°52′28″N 20°9′43″E
- Country: Poland
- Voivodeship: Łódź
- County: Skierniewice
- Gmina: Nowy Kawęczyn

Rzędków [ˈʐɛntkuf] is a village in the administrative district of Gmina Nowy Kawęczyn, within Skierniewice County, Łódź Voivodeship, in central Poland.
