= Byczki =

- Village
- Location within Poland
- Coordinates: 51°52′25″N 20°2′29″E
- Country: Poland
- Voivodeship: Łódź
- County: Skierniewice
- Gmina: Godzianów
- Population: 437

Byczki [ˈbɨt͡ʂki] is a village in the administrative district of Gmina Godzianów, within Skierniewice County, Łódź Voivodeship, in central Poland.
