= Jasień, Skierniewice County =

Jasień
- Village
- Location within Poland
- Coordinates: 51°48′22″N 20°7′12″E
- Country: Poland
- Voivodeship: Łódź
- County: Skierniewice
- Gmina: Głuchów

Jasień [ˈjaɕɛɲ] is a village in the administrative district of Gmina Głuchów, within Skierniewice County, Łódź Voivodeship, in central Poland.
