= Dąbrowice, Gmina Maków =

Dąbrowice
- Village
- Location within Poland
- Coordinates: 51°55′24″N 20°5′59″E
- Country: Poland
- Voivodeship: Łódź
- County: Skierniewice
- Gmina: Maków

Dąbrowice [dɔmbrɔˈvit͡sɛ] is a village in the administrative district of Gmina Maków, within Skierniewice County, Łódź Voivodeship, in central Poland.
