= Wólka Strobowska =

- Village
- Location within Poland
- Coordinates: 51°53′8″N 20°10′12″E
- Country: Poland
- Voivodeship: Łódź
- County: Skierniewice
- Gmina: Skierniewice

Wólka Strobowska [ˈvulka strɔˈbɔfska] is a village in the administrative district of Gmina Skierniewice, within Skierniewice County, Łódź Voivodeship, in central Poland.
