= Sielce Lewe =

- Village
- Location within Poland
- Coordinates: 51°59′12″N 20°1′43″E
- Country: Poland
- Voivodeship: Łódź
- County: Skierniewice
- Gmina: Maków
- Population: 150

Sielce Lewe [ˈɕɛlt͡sɛ ˈlɛvɛ] is a village in the administrative district of Gmina Maków, within Skierniewice County, Łódź Voivodeship, in central Poland.
