= Marianów, Gmina Nowy Kawęczyn =

Marianów
- Village
- Location within Poland
- Coordinates: 51°53′24″N 20°13′43″E
- Country: Poland
- Voivodeship: Łódź
- County: Skierniewice
- Gmina: Nowy Kawęczyn

Marianów [maˈrjanuf] is a village in the administrative district of Gmina Nowy Kawęczyn, within Skierniewice County, Łódź Voivodeship, in central Poland.
