= Kaczorów =

Kaczorów may refer to the following places in Poland:

- Kaczorów, Lower Silesian Voivodeship (south-west Poland)
- Kaczorów, Łódź Voivodeship (central Poland)
