= Słomków =

Słomków may refer to the following places in Poland:

- Słomków, Łódź Voivodeship
- Słomków, Masovian Voivodeship
