= Kazimierzów, Skierniewice County =

Kazimierzów
- Village
- Location within Poland
- Coordinates: 51°51′17″N 20°12′13″E
- Country: Poland
- Voivodeship: Łódź
- County: Skierniewice
- Gmina: Nowy Kawęczyn

Kazimierzów [kaʑiˈmjɛʐuf] is a village in the administrative district of Gmina Nowy Kawęczyn, within Skierniewice County, Łódź Voivodeship, in central Poland.
