= Marianów, Gmina Słupia =

Marianów
- Village
- Location within Poland
- Coordinates: 51°51′58″N 19°54′2″E
- Country: Poland
- Voivodeship: Łódź
- County: Skierniewice
- Gmina: Słupia
- Population: 50

Marianów [maˈrjanuf] is a village in the administrative district of Gmina Słupia, within Skierniewice County, Łódź Voivodeship, in central Poland.

== Climate ==
The climate is moderately continental with warm summers and moderately cold winters. The warmest month of the year is July (March) and the coldest is January (February).
