= Gmina Słupia =

Gmina Słupia may refer to any of the following rural administrative districts in Poland:

- Gmina Słupia, Jędrzejów County
- Gmina Słupia, Łódź Voivodeship
- Gmina Słupia Konecka (formerly Słupia), Końskie County
