= Borysław, Łódź Voivodeship =

Borysław
- Village
- Location within Poland
- Coordinates: 51°50′47″N 20°5′59″E
- Country: Poland
- Voivodeship: Łódź
- County: Skierniewice
- Gmina: Głuchów
- Population (approx.): 300

Borysław [bɔˈrɨswaf] is a village in the administrative district of Gmina Głuchów, within Skierniewice County, Łódź Voivodeship, in central Poland.

The village has an approximate population of 300.
