= Julków, Łódź Voivodeship =

Julków
- Village
- Location within Poland
- Coordinates: 51°53′6″N 20°7′28″E
- Country: Poland
- Voivodeship: Łódź
- County: Skierniewice
- Gmina: Skierniewice
- Population: 40

Julków [ˈjulkuf] is a village in the administrative district of Gmina Skierniewice, within Skierniewice County, Łódź Voivodeship, in central Poland.
