= Dębowa Góra, Skierniewice County =

Dębowa Góra
- Village
- Location within Poland
- Coordinates: 51°55′4″N 20°7′55″E
- Country: Poland
- Voivodeship: Łódź
- County: Skierniewice
- Gmina: Skierniewice

Dębowa Góra [dɛmˈbɔva ˈɡura] is a village in the administrative district of Gmina Skierniewice, within Skierniewice County, Łódź Voivodeship, in central Poland.
