= Siciska =

- Village
- Location within Poland
- Coordinates: 51°54′10″N 19°52′41″E
- Country: Poland
- Voivodeship: Łódź
- County: Skierniewice
- Gmina: Lipce Reymontowskie
- Population (approx.): 160

Siciska [ɕiˈt͡ɕiska] is a village in the administrative district of Gmina Lipce Reymontowskie, within Skierniewice County, Łódź Voivodeship, in central Poland.

The village has an approximate population of 160.
