= Zagórze, Skierniewice County =

Zagórze
- Village
- Location within Poland
- Coordinates: 51°52′51″N 19°56′33″E
- Country: Poland
- Voivodeship: Łódź
- County: Skierniewice
- Gmina: Słupia

Zagórze [zaˈɡuʐɛ] is a village in the administrative district of Gmina Słupia, within Skierniewice County, Łódź Voivodeship, in central Poland.
