= Marianka, Skierniewice County =

Marianka
- Village
- Location within Poland
- Coordinates: 51°51′N 20°15′E
- Country: Poland
- Voivodeship: Łódź
- County: Skierniewice
- Gmina: Nowy Kawęczyn

Marianka [maˈrjaŋka] is a village in the administrative district of Gmina Nowy Kawęczyn, within Skierniewice County, Łódź Voivodeship, in central Poland.
