= Złota =

Złota may refer to the following places:

- Złota, Lesser Poland Voivodeship (south Poland)
- Złota, Łódź Voivodeship (central Poland)
- Złota, Pińczów County in Świętokrzyskie Voivodeship (south Poland)
- Złota, Sandomierz County in Świętokrzyskie Voivodeship (south-central Poland)
- Złota, Masovian Voivodeship (east-central Poland)
- Złota, Greater Poland Voivodeship (central Poland)

or:

- Złota (river), a tributary of the San river in southeast Poland
