= Słupia, Skierniewice County =

Słupia
- Village
- Location within Poland
- Coordinates: 51°51′20″N 19°58′2″E
- Country: Poland
- Voivodeship: Łódź
- County: Skierniewice
- Gmina: Słupia
- Population: 733

Słupia [ˈswupja] is a village in Skierniewice County, Łódź Voivodeship, in central Poland. It is the seat of the gmina (administrative district) called Gmina Słupia.
