= Złota, Łódź Voivodeship =

Złota
- Village
- Location within Poland
- Coordinates: 51°46′20″N 20°8′28″E
- Country: Poland
- Voivodeship: Łódź
- County: Skierniewice
- Gmina: Głuchów
- Population: 670

Złota [ˈzwɔta] is a village in the administrative district of Gmina Głuchów, within Skierniewice County, Łódź Voivodeship, in central Poland.
