= Chlebów, Łódź Voivodeship =

Chlebów
- Village
- Location within Poland
- Coordinates: 51°55′41″N 19°56′11″E
- Country: Poland
- Voivodeship: Łódź
- County: Skierniewice
- Gmina: Lipce Reymontowskie

Chlebów [ˈxlɛbuf] is a village in the administrative district of Gmina Lipce Reymontowskie, within Skierniewice County, Łódź Voivodeship, in central Poland.
