= Gmina Nowy Kawęczyn =

Gmina Nowy Kawęczyn Nowy Kawęczyn Commune
- Gmina
- Interactive map of Gmina Nowy Kawęczyn
- Coordinates (Nowy Kawęczyn): 51°53′1″N 20°14′58″E
- Country: Poland
- Voivodeship: Łódź
- County: Skierniewice County
- Seat: Nowy Kawęczyn

Area
  - Total: 104.41 km^{2} (40.31 sq mi)

Population (2006)
  - Total: 3,295
  - Density: 31.56/km^{2} (81.74/sq mi)

Gmina Nowy Kawęczyn is a rural gmina (administrative district) in Skierniewice County, Łódź Voivodeship, in central Poland. Its seat is the village of Nowy Kawęczyn, which lies approximately 11 kilometres (7 mi) south-east of Skierniewice and 55 km (34 mi) east of the regional capital Łódź.

The gmina covers an area of 104.41 square kilometres (40.3 sq mi), and as of 2006 its total population is 3,295.

The gmina contains part of the protected area called Bolimów Landscape Park.

== Villages ==
Gmina Nowy Kawęczyn contains the villages and settlements of Adamów, Budy Trzcińskie, Doleck, Dukaczew, Dzwonkowice, Esterka, Franciszkany, Helenków, Kaczorów, Kawęczyn B, Kazimierzów, Kolonia Starorawska, Kwasowiec, Marianka, Marianów, Nowa Trzcianna, Nowy Dwór, Nowy Dwór-Parcela, Nowy Kawęczyn, Nowy Rzędków, Podfranciszkany, Podstrobów, Podtrzcianna, Prandotów, Psary, Raducz, Rawiczów, Rzędków, Sewerynów, Stara Rawa, Stary Rzędków, Strzyboga, Suliszew, Trzcianna, Zglinna Duża and Zglinna Mała.

== Neighbouring gminas ==
Gmina Nowy Kawęczyn is bordered by the gminas of Biała Rawska, Kowiesy, Puszcza Mariańska, Rawa Mazowiecka and Skierniewice.
