= Maków, Łódź Voivodeship =

Maków
- Village
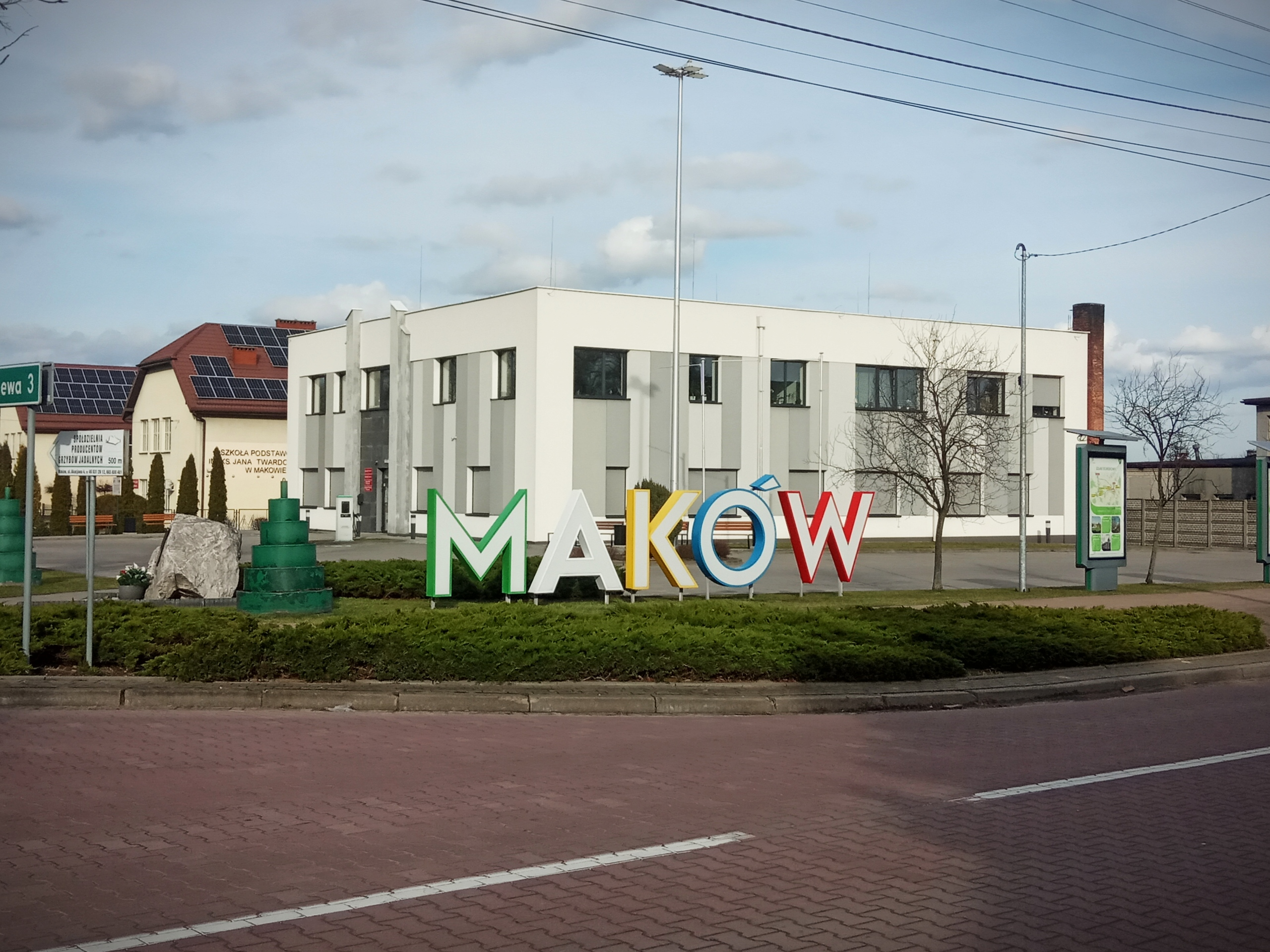
- Gmina office

- Location within Poland
- Coordinates: 51°56′47″N 20°2′51″E
- Country: Poland
- Voivodeship: Łódź
- County: Skierniewice
- Gmina: Maków
- Population: 1,600

Maków [ˈmakuf] is a village in Skierniewice County, Łódź Voivodeship, in central Poland. It is the seat of the gmina (administrative district) called Gmina Maków.
