= Gmina Głuchów =

Gmina Głuchów Głuchów Commune
- Gmina
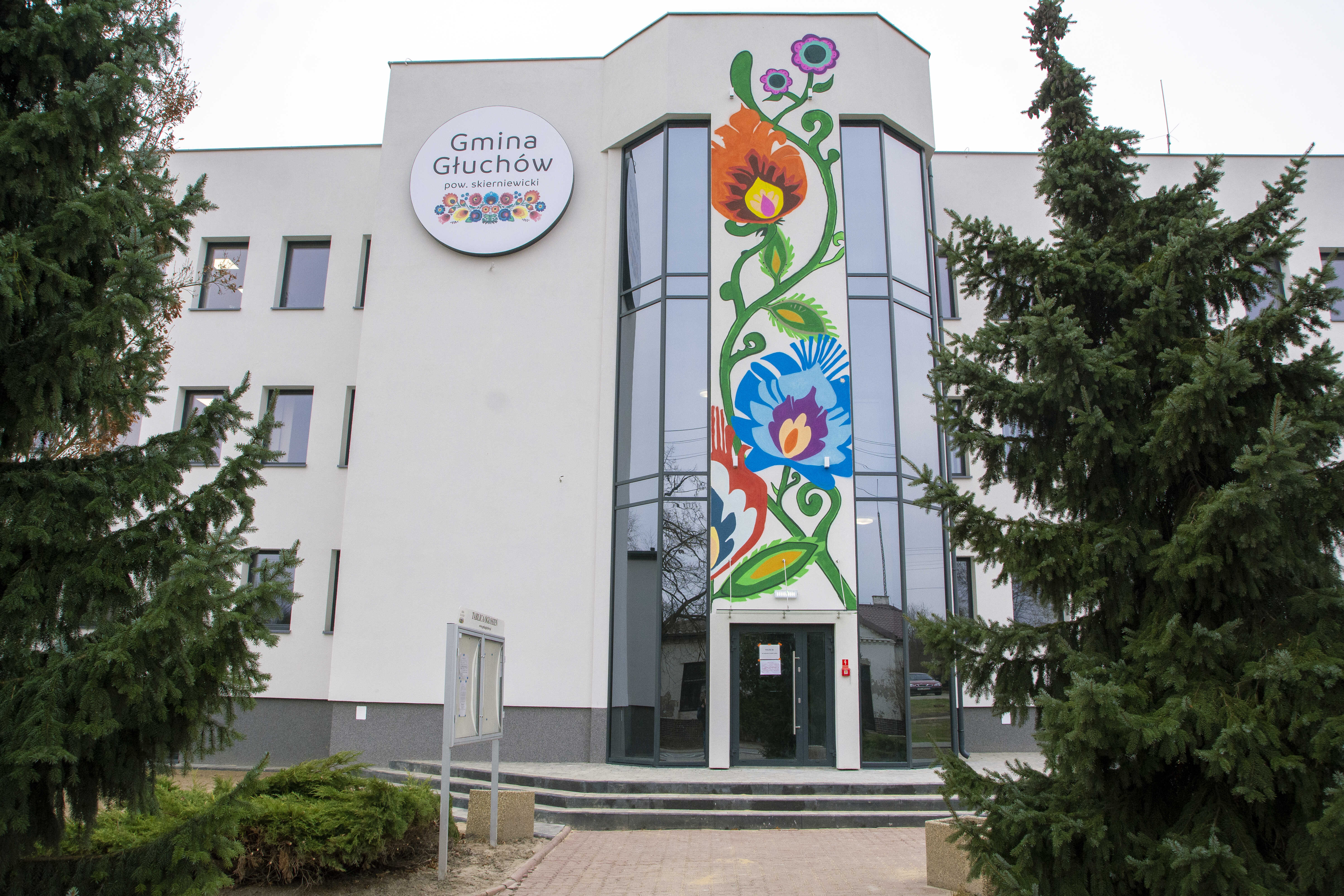
- Municipal office
- Interactive map of Gmina Głuchów
- Coordinates (Głuchów): 51°47′N 20°4′E
- Country: Poland
- Voivodeship: Łódź
- County: Skierniewice County
- Seat: Głuchów

Area
  - Total: 111.31 km^{2} (42.98 sq mi)

Population (2006)
  - Total: 6,001
  - Density: 53.91/km^{2} (139.6/sq mi)
- Time zone: UTC+1 (CET)
  - Summer (DST): UTC+2 (CEST)
- Website: www.gluchow.pl

Gmina Głuchów is a rural gmina (administrative district) in Skierniewice County, Łódź Voivodeship, in central Poland. Its seat is the village of Głuchów, which lies approximately 20 kilometres (12 mi) south of Skierniewice and 42 km (26 mi) east of the regional capital Łódź.

The gmina covers an area of 111.31 square kilometres (43.0 sq mi), and as of 2006, its total population was 6,001.

== Villages ==
Gmina Głuchów contains the villages and settlements of:

- Białynin
- Białynin-Południe
- Borysław
- Celigów
- Głuchów
- Janisławice
- Jasień
- Kochanów
- Michowice
- Miłochniewice
- Prusy
- Reczul
- Skoczykłody
- Wysokienice
- Złota

== Neighbouring gminas ==
Gmina Głuchów is bordered by the gminas of Biała Rawska, Godzianów, Jeżów, Rawa Mazowiecka, Skierniewice, Słupia and Żelechlinek.
