= Nowy Kawęczyn =

- Village
- Location within Poland
- Coordinates: 51°53′1″N 20°14′58″E
- Country: Poland
- Voivodeship: Łódź
- County: Skierniewice
- Gmina: Nowy Kawęczyn
- Population: 110

Nowy Kawęczyn [ˈnɔvɨ kaˈvɛnt͡ʂɨn] is a village in Skierniewice County, Łódź Voivodeship, in central Poland. It is the seat of the gmina (administrative district) called Gmina Nowy Kawęczyn.

In 2004 the village had a population of 110.
