= Sierakowice Lewe =

- Village
- Location within Poland
- Coordinates: 52°0′29″N 20°4′8″E
- Country: Poland
- Voivodeship: Łódź
- County: Skierniewice
- Gmina: Skierniewice
- Population: 640

Sierakowice Lewe [ɕɛrakɔˈvit͡sɛ ˈlɛvɛ] is a village in the administrative district of Gmina Skierniewice, within Skierniewice County, Łódź Voivodeship, in central Poland.
