= Święte Nowaki =

- Village
- Location within Poland
- Coordinates: 51°56′30″N 19°59′33″E
- Country: Poland
- Voivodeship: Łódź
- County: Skierniewice
- Gmina: Maków
- Population: 450

Święte Nowaki (Polish pronunciation: [ˈɕfjɛntɛ nɔˈvakʲi]) is a village in the administrative district of Gmina Maków, within Skierniewice County, Łódź Voivodeship, in central Poland.
