= Święte Laski =

- Village
- Location within Poland
- Coordinates: 51°56′2″N 19°58′27″E
- Country: Poland
- Voivodeship: Łódź
- County: Skierniewice
- Gmina: Maków
- Population: 270

Święte Laski (Polish pronunciation: [ˈɕfjɛntɛ ˈlaskʲi]) is a village in the administrative district of Gmina Maków, within Skierniewice County, Łódź Voivodeship, in central Poland.
