= Gmina Skierniewice =

Gmina Skierniewice Skierniewice Commune
- Gmina
- Flag Coat of arms
- Interactive map of Gmina Skierniewice
- Coordinates (Skierniewice): 51°57′10″N 20°8′30″E
- Country: Poland
- Voivodeship: Łódź
- County: Skierniewice County
- Seat: Skierniewice

Area
  - Total: 131.67 km^{2} (50.84 sq mi)

Population (2006)
  - Total: 6,736
  - Density: 51.16/km^{2} (132.5/sq mi)
- Website: http://gminaskierniewice.w.interia.pl

Gmina Skierniewice is a rural gmina (administrative district) in Skierniewice County, Łódź Voivodeship, in central Poland. Its seat is the town of Skierniewice, although the town is not part of the territory of the gmina.

The gmina covers an area of 131.67 square kilometres (50.8 sq mi), and as of 2006 its total population is 6,736.

== Villages ==
Gmina Skierniewice contains the villages and settlements of Balcerów, Borowiny, Brzozów, Budy Grabskie, Dąbrowice, Dębowa Góra, Józefatów, Julków, Ludwików, Miedniewice, Miedniewice-Topola, Mokra, Mokra Lewa, Mokra Prawa, Nowe Rowiska, Nowy Ludwików, Pamiętna, Pruszków, Ruda, Rzeczków, Rzymiec, Samice, Sierakowice Lewe, Sierakowice Prawe, Stare Rowiska, Strobów, Wola Wysoka, Wólka Strobowska, Zalesie and Żelazna.

== Neighbouring gminas ==
Gmina Skierniewice is bordered by the city of Skierniewice and by the gminas of Bolimów, Głuchów, Godzianów, Łyszkowice, Maków, Nieborów, Nowy Kawęczyn, Puszcza Mariańska and Rawa Mazowiecka.
