= Godzianów =

- Village
- Location within Poland
- Coordinates: 51°53′47″N 20°2′12″E
- Country: Poland
- Voivodeship: Łódź
- County: Skierniewice
- Gmina: Godzianów
- Population: 921

Godzianów [ɡɔˈd͡ʑanuf] is a village in Skierniewice County, Łódź Voivodeship, in central Poland. It is the seat of the gmina (administrative district) called Gmina Godzianów.
