= Modła, Łódź Voivodeship =

Modła
- Village
- Location within Poland
- Coordinates: 51°50′29″N 19°59′29″E
- Country: Poland
- Voivodeship: Łódź
- County: Skierniewice
- Gmina: Słupia

Modła [ˈmɔdwa] is a village in the administrative district of Gmina Słupia, within Skierniewice County, Łódź Voivodeship, in central Poland.
