= Gmina Godzianów =

Gmina Godzianów Godzianów Commune
- Gmina
- Interactive map of Gmina Godzianów
- Coordinates (Godzianów): 51°53′47″N 20°2′12″E
- Country: Poland
- Voivodeship: Łódź
- County: Skierniewice County
- Seat: Godzianów

Area
  - Total: 44.06 km^{2} (17.01 sq mi)

Population (2006)
  - Total: 2,709
  - Density: 61.48/km^{2} (159.2/sq mi)
- Time zone: UTC+1 (CET)
  - Summer (DST): UTC+2 (CEST)
- Website: www.godzianow.pl

Gmina Godzianów is a rural gmina (administrative district) in Skierniewice County, Łódź Voivodeship, in central Poland. Its seat is the village of Godzianów, which lies approximately 10 kilometres (6 mi) south-west of Skierniewice and 42 km (26 mi) east of the regional capital Łódź.

The gmina covers an area of 44.06 square kilometres (17.0 sq mi), and as of 2006 its total population is 2,709.

== Villages ==
Gmina Godzianów contains the villages and settlements of:

- Byczki
- Godzianów
- Kawęczyn
- Lnisno
- Płyćwia
- Zapady

== Neighbouring gminas ==
Gmina Godzianów is bordered by the gminas of Głuchów, Lipce Reymontowskie, Maków, Skierniewice and Słupia.
