= Gmina Lipce Reymontowskie =

Gmina Lipce Reymontowskie Lipce Reymontowskie Commune
- Gmina
- Flag Coat of arms
- Interactive map of Gmina Lipce Reymontowskie
- Coordinates (Lipce Reymontowskie): 51°53′54″N 19°56′27″E
- Country: Poland
- Voivodeship: Łódź
- County: Skierniewice County
- Seat: Lipce Reymontowskie

Area
  - Total: 42.7 km^{2} (16.5 sq mi)

Population (2006)
  - Total: 3,323
  - Density: 77.8/km^{2} (202/sq mi)
- Website: http://www.lipcereymontowskie.pl

Gmina Lipce Reymontowskie is a rural gmina (administrative district) in Skierniewice County, Łódź Voivodeship, in central Poland. Its seat is the village of Lipce Reymontowskie, which lies approximately 16 kilometres (10 mi) south-west of Skierniewice and 36 km (22 mi) east of the regional capital Łódź.

The gmina covers an area of 42.7 square kilometres (16.5 sq mi), and as of 2006 its total population is 3,323.

== Villages ==
Gmina Lipce Reymontowskie contains the villages and settlements of Chlebów, Drzewce, Lipce Reymontowskie, Mszadla, Retniowiec, Siciska, Wola Drzewiecka, Wólka Krosnowska and Wólka Podlesie.

== Neighbouring gminas ==
Gmina Lipce Reymontowskie is bordered by the gminas of Dmosin, Godzianów, Łyszkowice, Maków, Rogów and Słupia.
