= Prusy, Łódź Voivodeship =

Prusy
- Village
- Location within Poland
- Coordinates: 51°48′45″N 20°4′54″E
- Country: Poland
- Voivodeship: Łódź
- County: Skierniewice
- Gmina: Głuchów
- Population: 95

Prusy [ˈprusɨ] is a village in the administrative district of Gmina Głuchów, within Skierniewice County, Łódź Voivodeship, in central Poland.
