= Żelazna, Skierniewice County =

Żelazna
- Village
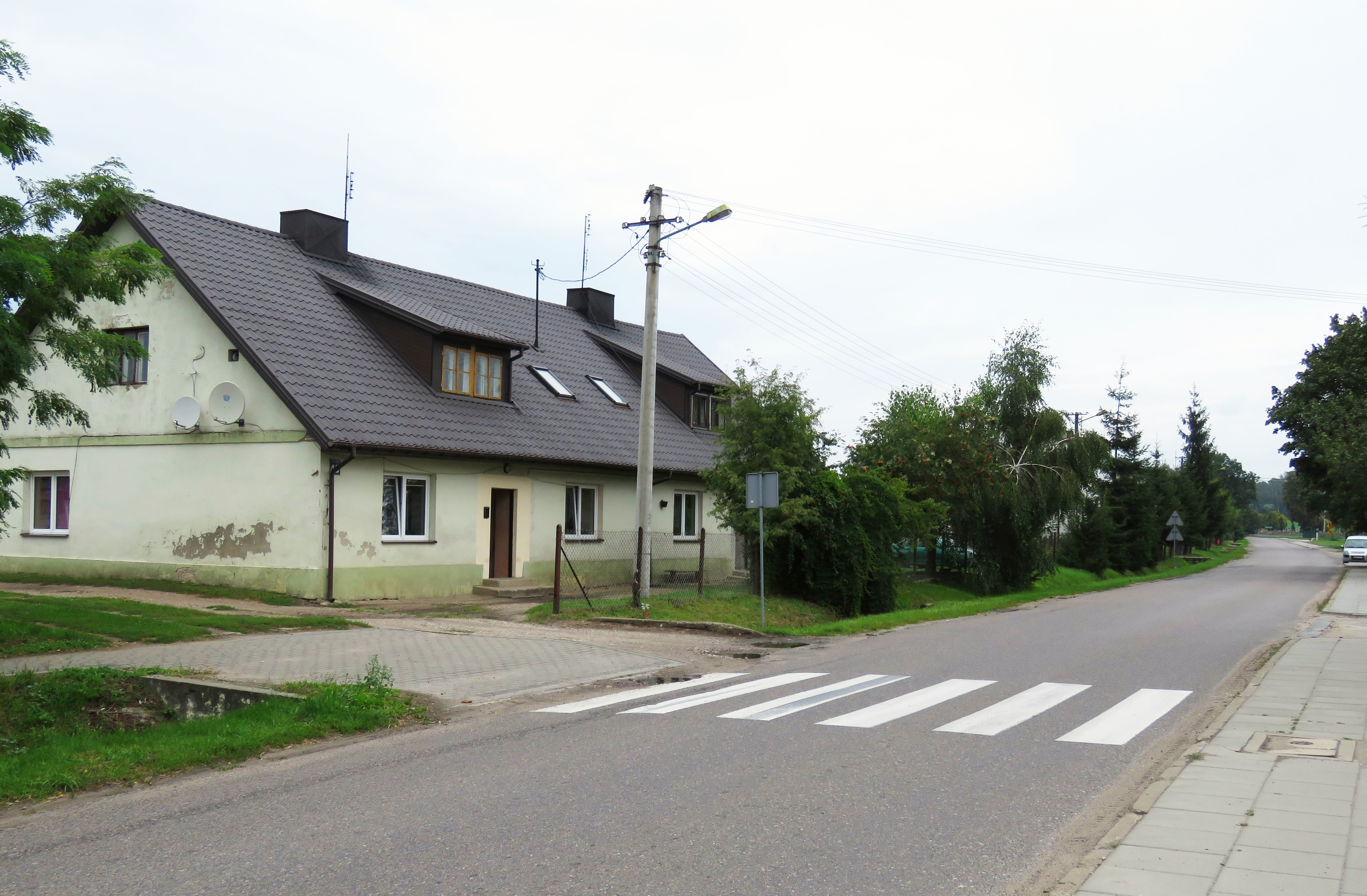

- Location within Poland
- Coordinates: 51°52′2″N 20°8′10″E
- Country: Poland
- Voivodeship: Łódź
- County: Skierniewice
- Gmina: Skierniewice

Żelazna [ʐɛˈlazna] is a village in the administrative district of Gmina Skierniewice, within Skierniewice County, Łódź Voivodeship, in central Poland.
