= Winna Góra, Łódź Voivodeship =

Winna Góra
- Village
- Location within Poland
- Coordinates: 51°52′7″N 19°54′54″E
- Country: Poland
- Voivodeship: Łódź
- County: Skierniewice
- Gmina: Słupia

Winna Góra [ˈvinna ˈɡura] is a village in the administrative district of Gmina Słupia, within Skierniewice County, Łódź Voivodeship, in central Poland.
