= Sierakowice Prawe =

- Village
- Location within Poland
- Coordinates: 52°1′N 20°6′E
- Country: Poland
- Voivodeship: Łódź
- County: Skierniewice
- Gmina: Skierniewice
- Population: 630

Sierakowice Prawe [ɕɛrakɔˈvit͡sɛ ˈpravɛ] is a village in the administrative district of Gmina Skierniewice, within Skierniewice County, Łódź Voivodeship, in central Poland.
