= Głuchów, Skierniewice County =

Głuchów
- Village
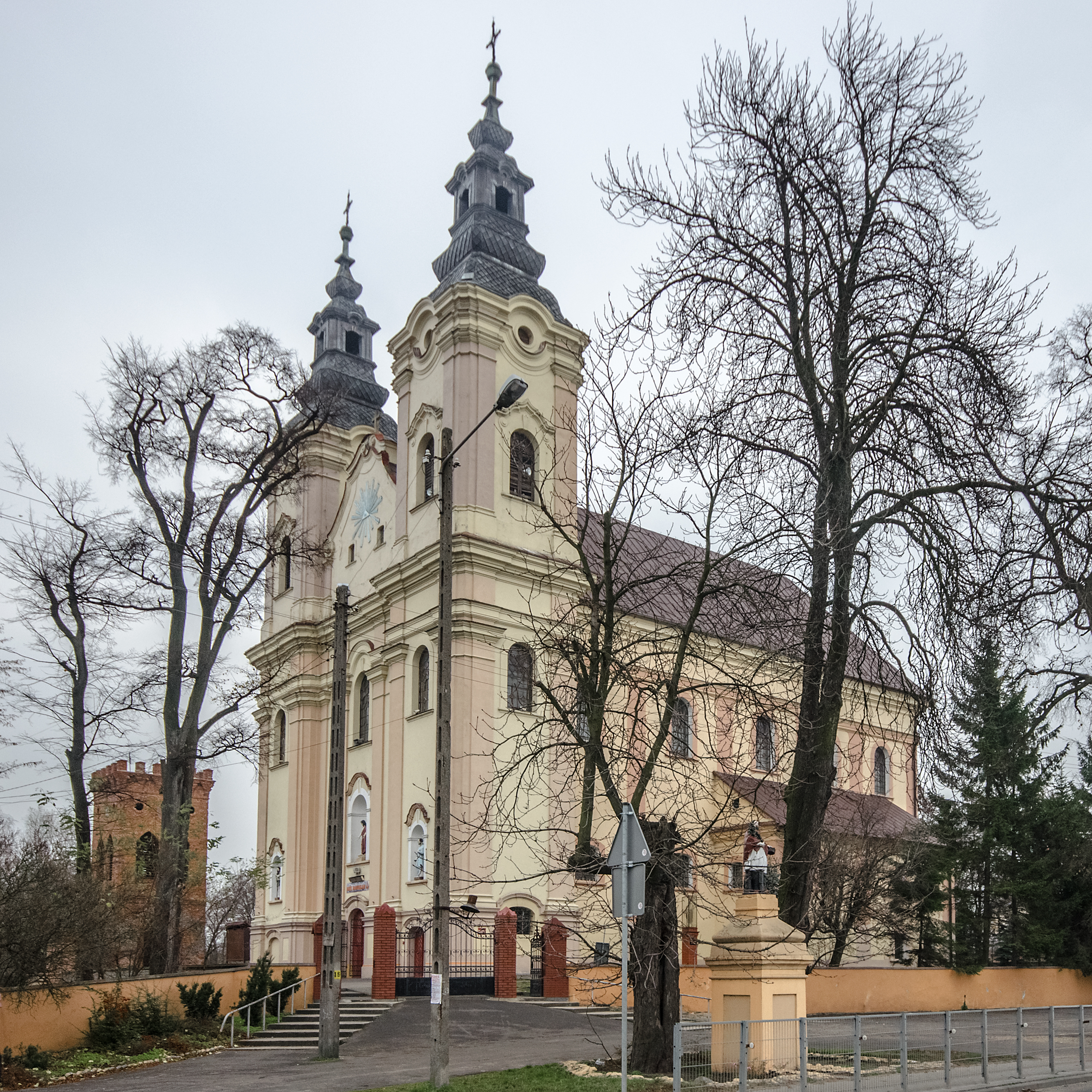
- Saint Wenceslaus church

- Location within Poland
- Coordinates: 51°47′N 20°4′E
- Country: Poland
- Voivodeship: Łódź
- County: Skierniewice
- Gmina: Głuchów
- Population: 1,000

Głuchów [ˈɡwuxuf] is a village in Skierniewice County, Łódź Voivodeship, in central Poland. It is the seat of the gmina (administrative district) called Gmina Głuchów.
