= Gmina Maków =

Gmina Maków Maków Commune
- Gmina
- Coat of arms
- Interactive map of Gmina Maków
- Coordinates (Maków): 51°56′47″N 20°2′51″E
- Country: Poland
- Voivodeship: Łódź
- County: Skierniewice County
- Seat: Maków

Area
  - Total: 82.97 km^{2} (32.03 sq mi)

Population (2006)
  - Total: 5,996
  - Density: 72.27/km^{2} (187.2/sq mi)

Gmina Maków is a rural gmina (administrative district) in Skierniewice County, Łódź Voivodeship, in central Poland. Its seat is the village of Maków, which lies approximately 7 kilometres (4 mi) west of Skierniewice and 44 km (27 mi) north-east of the regional capital Łódź.

The gmina covers an area of 82.97 square kilometres (32.0 sq mi), and as of 2006, its total population was 5,996.

== Villages ==
Gmina Maków contains the villages and settlements of Dąbrowice, Jacochów, Krężce, Maków, Maków-Kolonia, Pszczonów, Sielce Lewe, Sielce Prawe, Słomków, Święte Laski, Święte Nowaki and Wola Makowska.

== Neighbouring gminas ==
Gmina Maków is bordered by the city of Skierniewice and by the gminas of Godzianów, Lipce Reymontowskie, Łyszkowice and Skierniewice.
