= Lipce Reymontowskie =

- Village
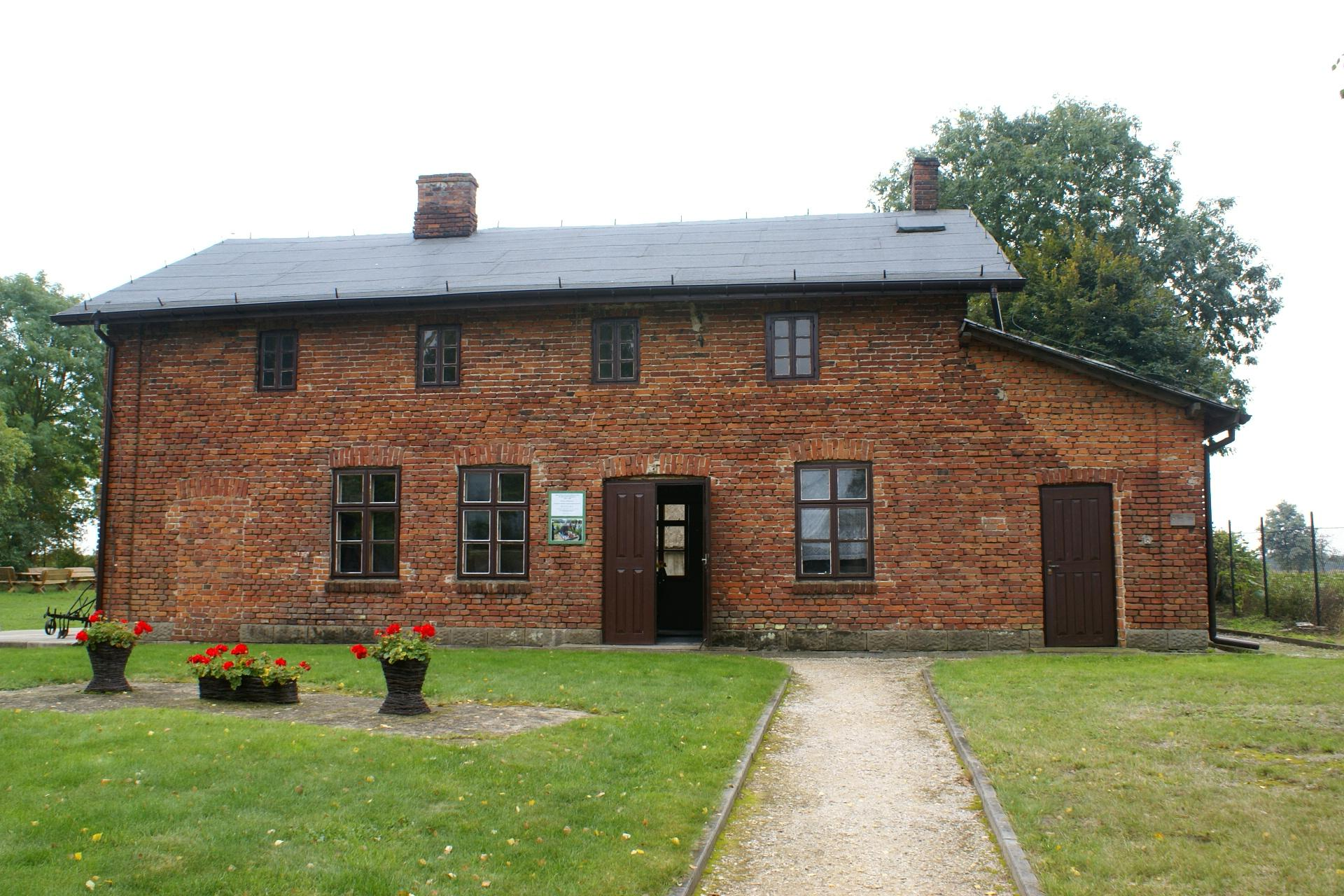
- Regional Museum of Władysław Stanisław Reymont

- Location within Poland
- Coordinates: 51°53′54″N 19°56′27″E
- Country: Poland
- Voivodeship: Łódź
- County: Skierniewice
- Gmina: Lipce Reymontowskie

Population
  - Total: 1,200
- Website: http://lipcereymontowskie.pl/

Lipce Reymontowskie [ˈlipt͡sɛ rɛjmɔnˈtɔfskʲɛ] (until 1984 Lipce) is a village in Skierniewice County, Łódź Voivodeship, in central Poland. It is the seat of the gmina (administrative district) called Gmina Lipce Reymontowskie.

Polish novelist Władysław Stanisław Reymont, after whom the village was renamed in 1983, placed the plot of his novel The Peasants in the village of Lipce.
