= Kaczorów, Łódź Voivodeship =

Kaczorów
- Village
- Location within Poland
- Coordinates: 51°53′10″N 20°14′23″E
- Country: Poland
- Voivodeship: Łódź
- County: Skierniewice
- Gmina: Nowy Kawęczyn

Kaczorów [kaˈt͡ʂɔruf] is a village in the administrative district of Gmina Nowy Kawęczyn, within Skierniewice County, Łódź Voivodeship, in central Poland.
