= Słupia-Pokora =

- Village
- Location within Poland
- Coordinates: 51°51′25″N 19°57′55″E
- Country: Poland
- Voivodeship: Łódź
- County: Skierniewice
- Gmina: Słupia

Słupia-Pokora [ˈswupja pɔˈkɔra] is a village in the administrative district of Gmina Słupia, within Skierniewice County, Łódź Voivodeship, in central Poland.
