= Podłęcze, Łódź Voivodeship =

Podłęcze
- Village
- Location within Poland
- Coordinates: 51°52′13″N 19°53′56″E
- Country: Poland
- Voivodeship: Łódź
- County: Skierniewice
- Gmina: Słupia

Podłęcze [pɔdˈwɛnt͡ʂɛ] is a village in the administrative district of Gmina Słupia, within Skierniewice County, Łódź Voivodeship, in central Poland.
