= Słomków, Łódź Voivodeship =

Słomków
- Village
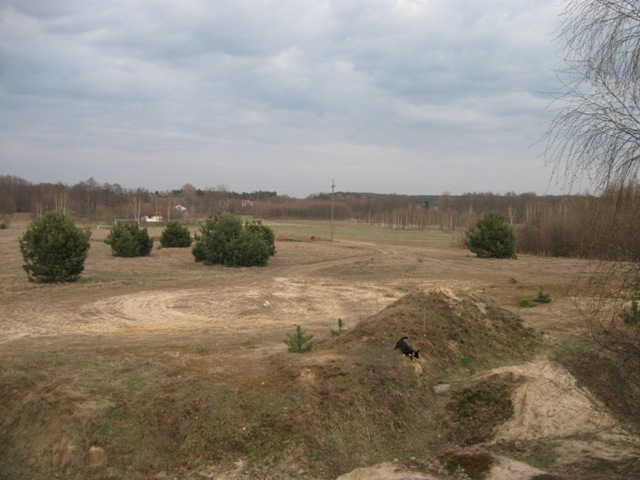

- Location within Poland
- Coordinates: 51°57′30″N 19°59′48″E
- Country: Poland
- Voivodeship: Łódź
- County: Skierniewice
- Gmina: Maków
- Population: 660

Słomków [ˈswɔmkuf] is a village in the administrative district of Gmina Maków, within Skierniewice County, Łódź Voivodeship, in central Poland.
