= Gmina Słupia, Łódź Voivodeship =

Gmina Słupia Słupia Commune
- Gmina
- Flag Coat of arms
- Interactive map of Gmina Słupia
- Coordinates (Słupia): 51°51′20″N 19°58′2″E
- Country: Poland
- Voivodeship: Łódź
- County: Skierniewice County
- Seat: Słupia

Area
  - Total: 41.16 km^{2} (15.89 sq mi)

Population (2006)
  - Total: 2,658
  - Density: 64.58/km^{2} (167.3/sq mi)
- Website: slupia.com.pl

Gmina Słupia is a rural gmina (administrative district) in Skierniewice County, Łódź Voivodeship, in central Poland. Its seat is the village of Słupia, which lies approximately 17 kilometres (11 mi) south-west of Skierniewice and 36 km (22 mi) east of the regional capital Łódź.

The gmina covers an area of 41.16 square kilometres (15.9 sq mi), and as of 2006, its total population was 2,658.

== Villages ==
Gmina Słupia contains the villages and settlements of Bonarów, Bonarów-Działki, Gzów, Krosnowa, Marianów, Modła, Nowa Krosnowa, Podłęcze, Słupia, Słupia-Folwark, Słupia-Pokora, Winna Góra, Wólka-Nazdroje and Zagórze.

== Neighbouring gminas ==
Gmina Słupia is bordered by the gminas of Głuchów, Godzianów, Jeżów, Lipce Reymontowskie and Rogów.
