= Skierniewice County =

Skierniewice County Powiat skierniewicki
- County
- Coat of arms

- Location within the voivodeship
- Coordinates (Skierniewice): 51°57′10″N 20°8′30″E
- Country: Poland
- Voivodeship: Łódź
- Seat: Skierniewice
- Gminas: Total 9: Gmina Bolimów; Gmina Głuchów; Gmina Godzianów; Gmina Kowiesy; Gmina Lipce Reymontowskie; Gmina Maków; Gmina Nowy Kawęczyn; Gmina Skierniewice; Gmina Słupia

Area
  - Total: 756.12 km^{2} (291.94 sq mi)

Population (2006)
  - Total: 37,779
  - Density: 49.964/km^{2} (129.41/sq mi)
- Car plates: ESK
- Website: www.powiat-skierniewice.pl

Skierniewice County (Polish: powiat skierniewicki) is a unit of territorial administration and local government (powiat) in Łódź Voivodeship, central Poland. It came into being on January 1, 1999, as a result of the Polish local government reforms passed in 1998. Its administrative seat is the city of Skierniewice, although the city is not part of the county (it constitutes a separate city county); there are no towns within the county.

The county covers an area of 756.12 square kilometres (291.9 sq mi). As of 2006 its total population is 37,779.

== Neighbouring counties ==
Apart from the city of Skierniewice, Skierniewice County is also bordered by Sochaczew County to the north, Żyrardów County to the east, Rawa County and Tomaszów County to the south, Brzeziny County to the west, and Łowicz County to the north-west.

== Administrative divisions ==
The county is subdivided into nine gminas. These are listed in the following table, in descending order of population.

Gmina	Type	Area (km^{2})	Population (2006)	Seat
Gmina Skierniewice	rural	131.7	6,736	Skierniewice *
Gmina Głuchów	rural	111.3	6,001	Głuchów
Gmina Maków	rural	83.0	5,996	Maków
Gmina Bolimów	rural	112.2	4,026	Bolimów
Gmina Lipce Reymontowskie	rural	42.7	3,323	Lipce Reymontowskie
Gmina Nowy Kawęczyn	rural	104.4	3,295	Nowy Kawęczyn
Gmina Kowiesy	rural	85.6	3,035	Kowiesy
Gmina Godzianów	rural	44.1	2,709	Godzianów
Gmina Słupia	rural	41.2	2,658	Słupia
* seat not part of the gmina
