= Jeruzal =

Jeruzal Jeruzal Skierniewicki
- Village
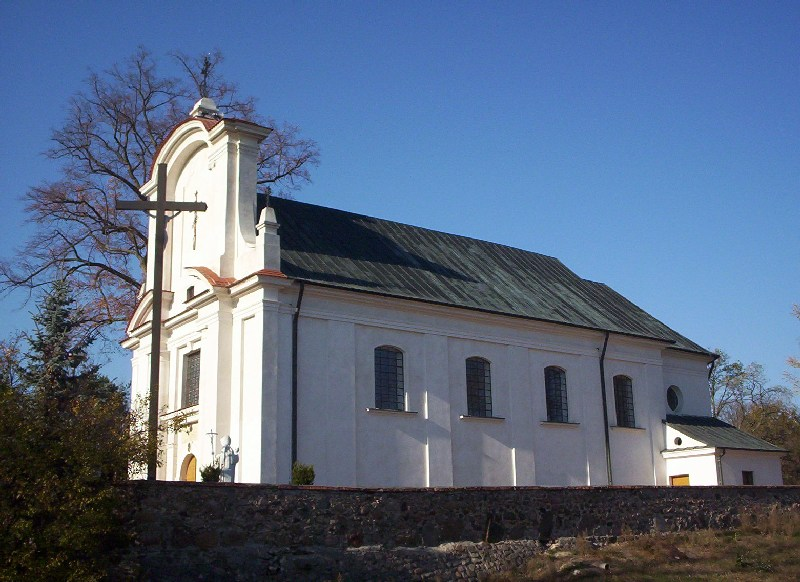
- Church in Jeruzal, built in 1798

- Location within Poland
- Coordinates: 51°55′30″N 20°21′50″E
- Country: Poland
- Voivodeship: Łódź
- County: Skierniewice
- Gmina: Kowiesy
- Population: 208 (in 2,011)
- Postal code: 96-111
- Car plates: ESK

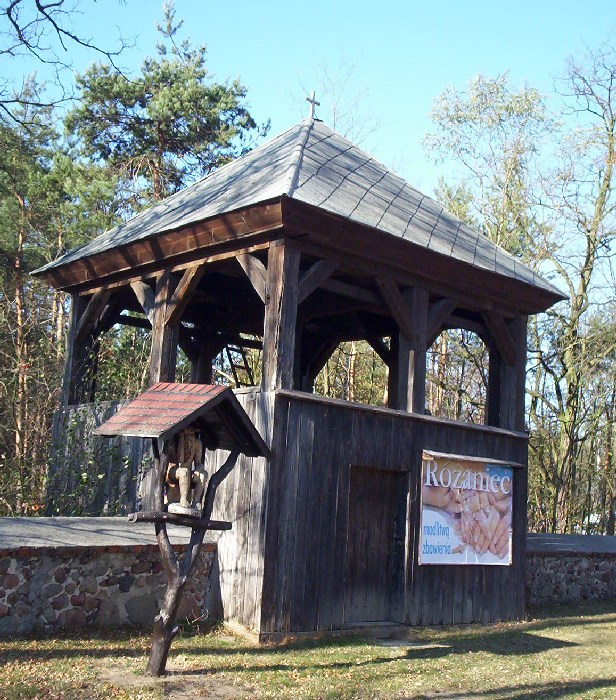
Belfry in Jeruzal

Jeruzal (or Jeruzal Skierniewicki) [jɛˈruzal] is a village in the administrative di.strict of Gmina Kowiesy, within Skierniewice County, Łódź Voivodship, in central Poland.

== Integral parts ==
- Chorbów
- Dębniak
- Jeruzal Poduchowny
- Klin

== History ==
Jeruzal is an old village, probably existing since 12. century, the first information about this comes from 1290 year. Village's name comes from Latin name of Jerusalem. In this time sometimes Jeruzal was called as "Jaruzel".

In 16. century in village lived noble family of Jaruzelski, with Ślepowron coat of arms, in 17. century Jeruzal became the ownership of related with Jaruzelskis Łajszczewski family, with Prawdzic coat of arms.

In this time Jeruzal was a big and populous village, with tavern and few shops, once a month it was a fair.

In next years, along with economic crisis, downfall of Jeruzal happened.

In 1792 Jeruzal became the ownership of Józef Niemirycz, Klamry coat of arms, who later took fortune of Łajszczewski's family. After death of Józef in 1802, Jeruzal was taken by his son, Ignacy.

After second partition of Poland in 1793, Jeruzal became part of Prussia. In 1807 it became a part of Duchy of Warsaw and in 1815 of Congress Poland.

In 1836 Ignacy Niemirycz sold Jeruzal to Adam Napoleon Horbowski, who owned this until his death in 1876.

In the beginning of 20. century in village appeared mariavites, who had a support from vicar, thanks to this their community quickly grew. In August 1906, because of conflict about the right to ownship of Jeruzal's Church, mariavites started occupation of this building. After 3 days powers decided to restore an order with using strength. After this, all mariavites left Jeruzal, part of them moved to neaby Wólka Jeruzalska.

During World War I because of the conflict Jeruzal was in part destroyed (including building of church was damaged); during World War II villages did not have any serious damage.

In 1954-1972, village was a seat of Gromada Jeruzal. Except from Jeruzal, in the area of gromada were also villages: Chełmce, Doleck, Esterka, Lisna, Sewerynów and Wólka Jeruzalska; in 1959-1972 to gromada belonged also: Budy Wolskie, Dzwonkowice, Emilianów Łajszczew Stary, Psary Dzwonkowickie, Sapy and Staropol.

== Cultural properties ==
- Church (since 1967)
- Belfry (since 1967)
- Cementary (since 1994)

== Parish ==
The parish in Jeruzal was established in late 13. century.

In 1798 was built current church.

Currently to parish belong also villages: Budy Wolskie (1-21), Chełmce, Doleck, Dzwonkowice, Emilianów, Esterka, Lisna, Lisowola, Niemieryczew, Nowy Karolinów, Nowy Łajszczew, Paplin (1-42), Paplinek (13-18), Pękoszew, Sapy, Sewerynów, Stary Karolinów, Stary Łajszczew, Wincentów, Wola Pękoszewska, Wólka Jeruzalska, Wycinka Wolska, Wycześniak.
