= Lisna =

Lisna, Líšná or Lişna may refer to places:

== Czech Republic ==
- Líšná (Přerov District), a municipality and village in the Olomouc Region
- Líšná (Rokycany District), a municipality and village in the Plzeň Region
- Líšná (Žďár nad Sázavou District), a municipality and village in the Vysočina Region

== Poland ==
- Lisna, Poland, a village

== Romania ==
- Lişna, village in Suharău commune
