= Ulaski =

Ulaski may refer to:

- Ulaski, Łódź Voivodeship (central Poland)
- Ulaski, Maków County in Masovian Voivodeship (east-central Poland)
- Ulaski, Pułtusk County in Masovian Voivodeship (east-central Poland)
