= Jan Maklakiewicz =

Polish composer, conductor, critic, and music educator

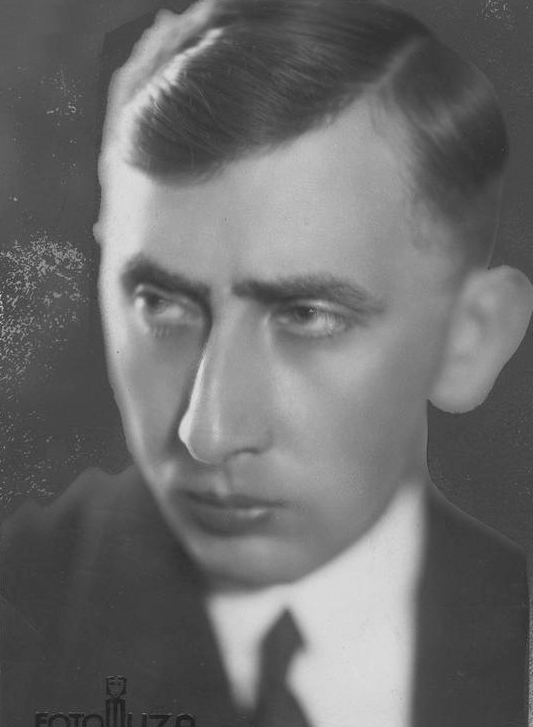
Jan Maklakiewicz

Jan Adam Maklakiewicz (24 November 1899, Chojnata, Congress Poland – 7 February 1954, Warsaw) was a Polish composer, conductor, critic, and music educator. His most known compositions belong to the choral music.

== Selected filmography ==
- Pan Twardowski (1936)

Cultural offices
Preceded by Andrzej Panufnik	Music directors, Warsaw Philharmonic Orchestra; 1947–1948	Succeeded by Witold Rudziński
