= Długokąty =

Długokąty may refer to the following places in Poland:

- Długokąty, Lower Silesian Voivodeship (south-west Poland)
- Długokąty, Mława County in Masovian Voivodeship (east-central Poland)
- Długokąty, Żyrardów County in Masovian Voivodeship (east-central Poland)
