= Jeruzal (disambiguation) =

Jeruzal may refer to the following places:

- Jeruzal in Łódź Voivodeship (central Poland)
- Jeruzal, Białobrzegi County in Masovian Voivodeship (east-central Poland)
- Jeruzal, Mińsk County in Masovian Voivodeship (east-central Poland)
