= Zygmunt Wrzodak =

Polish politician (born 1959)

member of Sejm 2005-2007
- In office 25 September 2005 – 2007

Personal details
- Born: 21 March 1959 (age 67)
- Party: Narodowe Koło Parlamentarne

Zygmunt Wrzodak (born 21 March 1959 in Budy Zaklasztorne) is a Polish politician. He was elected to the Sejm on 25 September 2005, getting 18,921 votes in 23 Rzeszów district as a candidate from the League of Polish Families list.

He was also a member of Sejm 2001-2005.

== See also ==
- Members of Polish Sejm 2005-2007
