= Esterka =

Mistress of Casimir III the Great

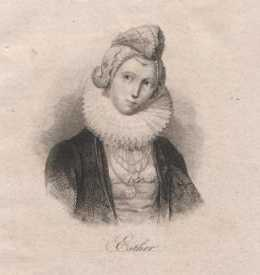
Esterka (undated, pre-1839)

Esterka (also Estera) is the name traditionally given to a Jewish woman who, according to later chronicles and folklore, became the mistress of Casimir III the Great, King of Poland from 1333 to 1370. Medieval Polish and Jewish writers often treated the story as historical, recounting a celebrated romance between the king and the beautiful Jewish woman.

== Legend ==
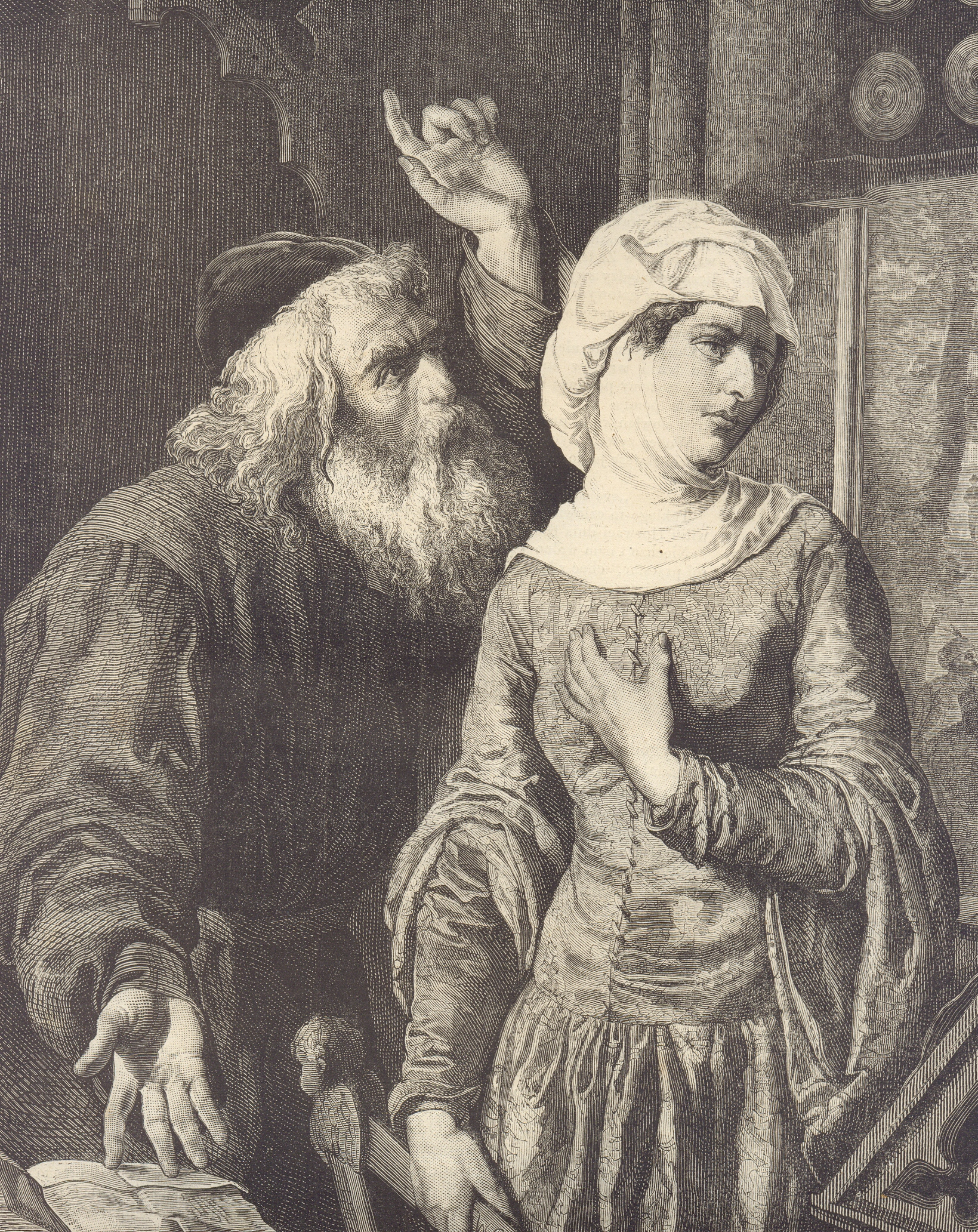
Esterka Małach

The first account of Esterka can be found in scripts of the 15th-century Polish chronicler Jan Długosz and recorded again, a century later, by the famous Jewish chronicler David Gans, who even maintained that Esterka was married to the king. Gans wrote:

"Casimir, the king of Poland, took for himself a concubine - a young Jewess named Esther. Of all the maidens of the land, none compared to her beauty. She was his wife for many years. For her sake, the king extended many privileges to the Jews of his kingdom. She persuaded the king to issue documents of freedom and beneficence."

According to the legend, Esterka was the daughter of a poor tailor from Opoczno named Rafael. Her beauty and intelligence were legendary. She was later installed in the royal palace of Lobzovo near Krakow.

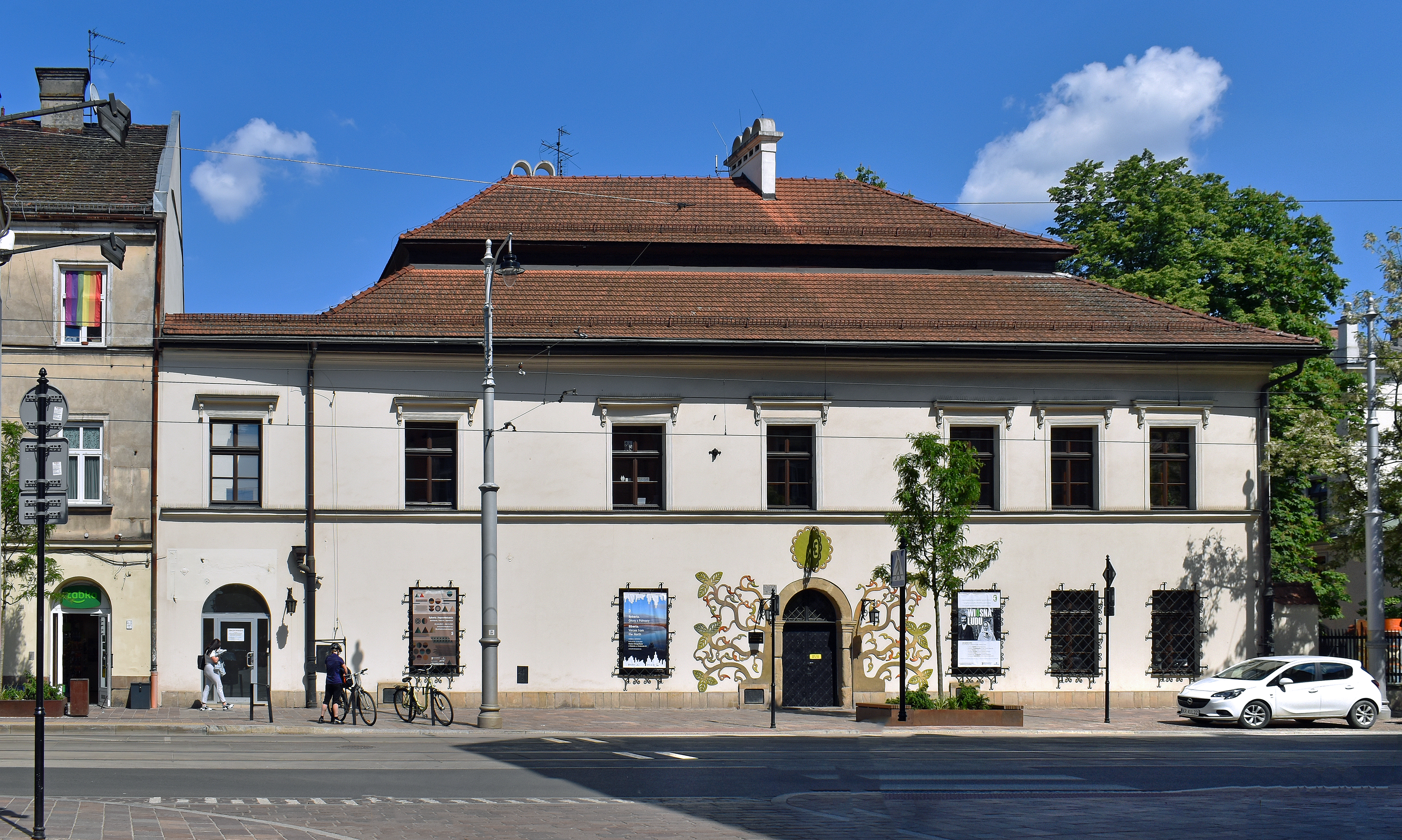
Seweryn Udziela Ethnographic Museum in Krakow. Krakowska street 46. Esterka Building (1872).

Esterka was said to have played a significant role in Casimir's life. In the legend, she performed as a King's adviser in support of various initiatives: free trade, building stone cities, tolerance to representatives of different religious faiths and support of cultural development. Casimir was loyal to the Jews and encouraged them. For many years, Krakow was the home of one of the most important Jewish communities in Europe. He was called The Great King for his intelligence and bright vision, which helped him to increase the size and wealth of Poland. During the years of the Black Death Esterka's influence helped to prevent the murder of many Polish Jews who were scapegoated for the disease.

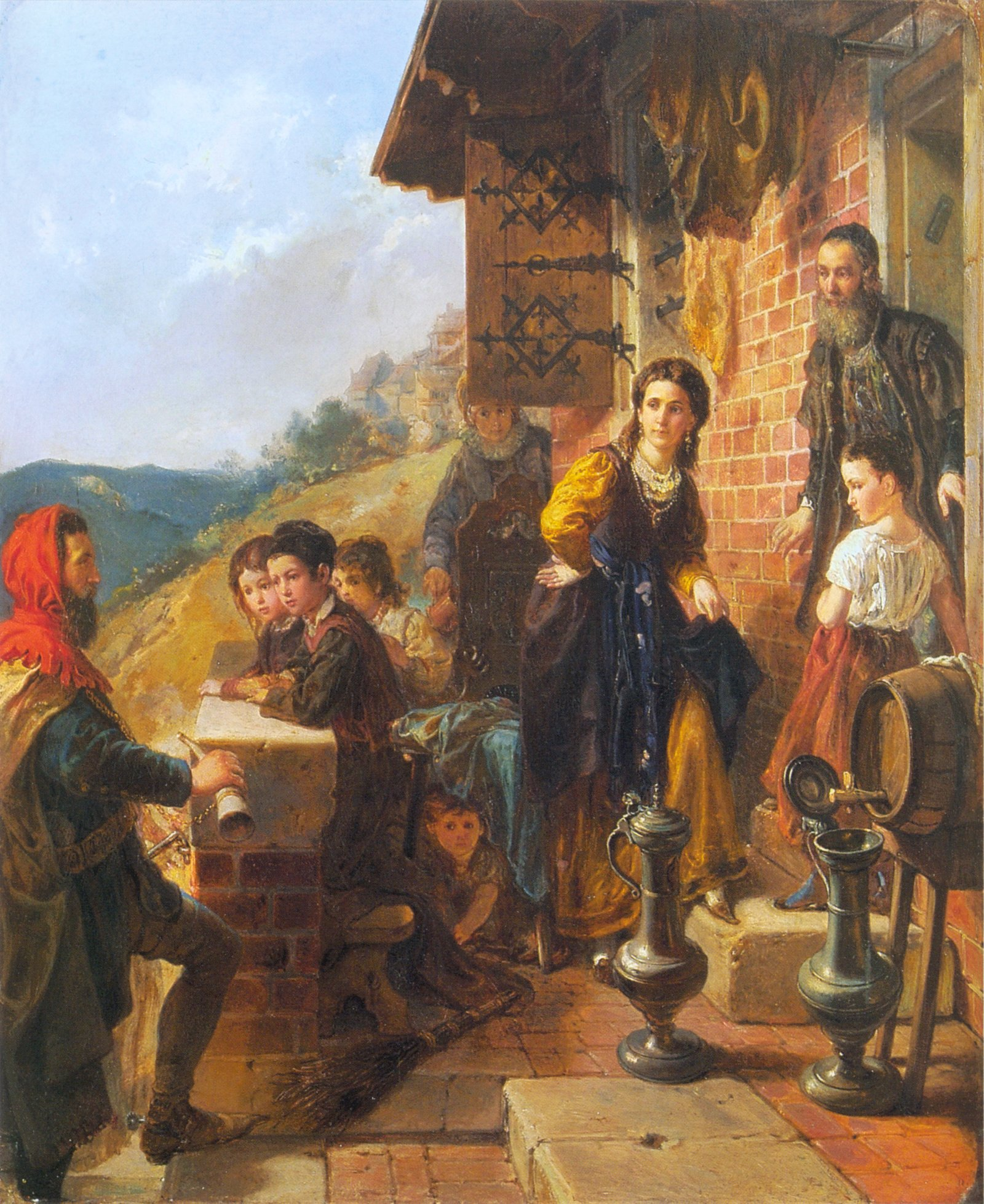
"Casimir the Great Arriving to the House of his Mistress Esterka", by Władysław Łuszczkiewicz (1870)

King Casmir had several wives, but Esterka was said to have been the only one who gave him male offspring despite the fact that they never were officially married. Their sons, Pelko and Nemir, were said in the legend to have been baptized on the request of their father. The two became the mythical ancestors of several Polish noble families. To develop legal and commercial relations between Jews, Poles, and Germans, Pelko was sent to Kraków. In 1363, Nemir was sent to Ruthenia to establish a new knightly order, which later became the patrimonial nest of the Rudanovsky dynasty. She also had two daughters brought up as Jews.

After Casimir's death, his nephew Louis of Hungary became the King of Poland. During his reign, riots broke out against the Jews, especially violent in Krakow. According to the legend, rioters broke into Esterka's palace in Lobzovo and murdered her and her two daughters. Rudanovsky from Rudawa River was considered Esterka's burial.

== Places ==
Esterka House

Seweryn Udziela Ethnographic Museum in Kraków is located at Krakowska street 46.

Wawel Castle

Several places such as villages, streets and monuments in Poland are named after Esterka including a street in Cracow and usually ones associated with her and the King. In some sources Esterka is presented as King's consort who actually lived with him at Wawel Castle.

Royal Palace in Łobzów

King Cazimir built a fortalicium on the trade route leading to Silesia. It was a castle with a tower whose function was to defend the city from the north. But according to the legend, the King built it for his beloved Esterka.

Esterka Mound

Esterka Mound was situated on Rudawa river, more than 3 km to the northwest of Wawel Hill in the gardens of the royal palace at Łobzów. The mound was excavated at the end of the eighteenth century on the initiative of King Stanisław August Poniatowski in the belief that it would contain Esterka's medieval grave. The mound was completely destroyed in the 1950s during the construction of a sports stadium.

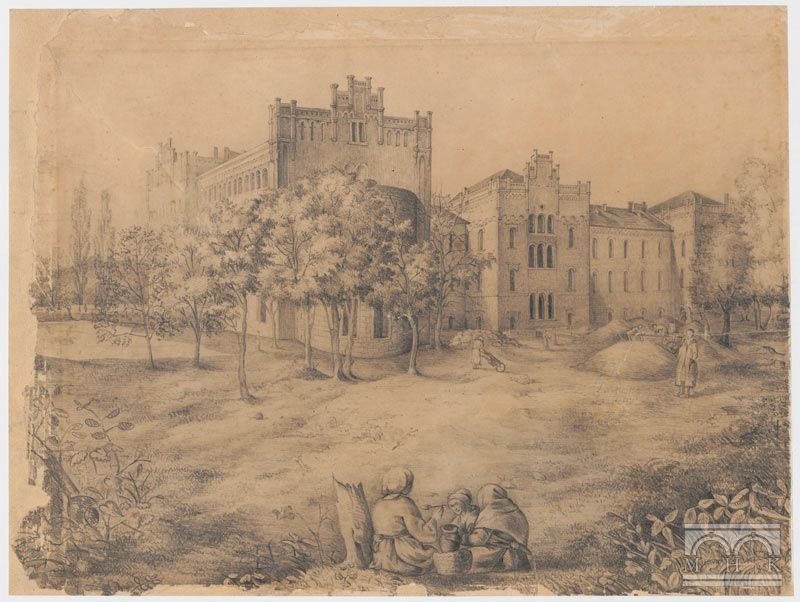
Royal Palace in Łobzów

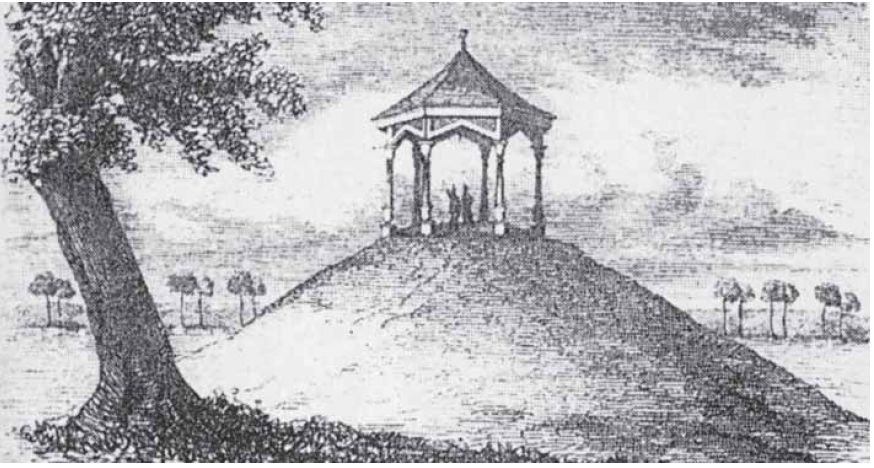
Esterka Mound

== In modern culture ==
A historical mural at Joseph Street was introduced in 2016. It portrays people associated with the district: King Kazimierz the Great and Esterka.

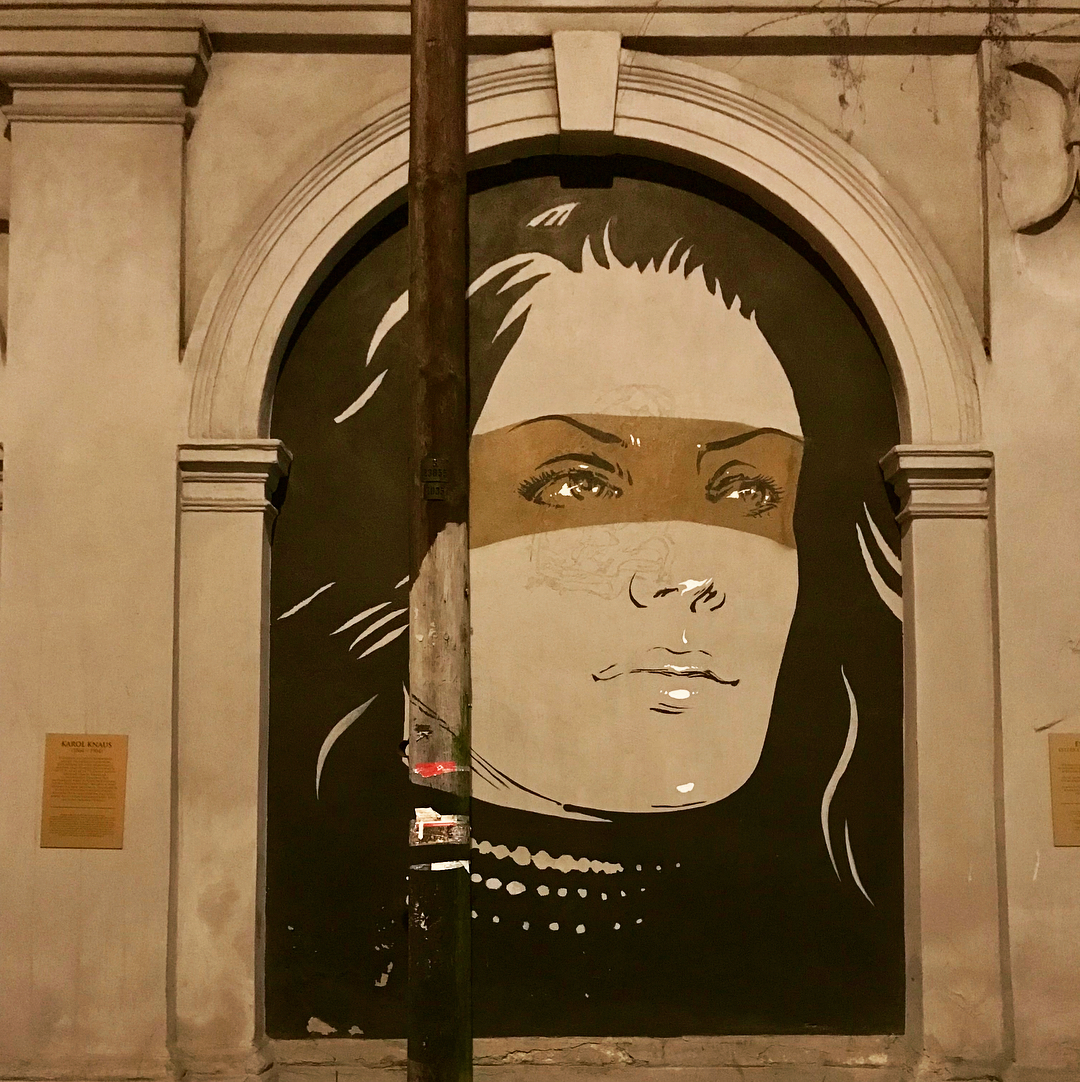
Historical Mural at Joseph Street

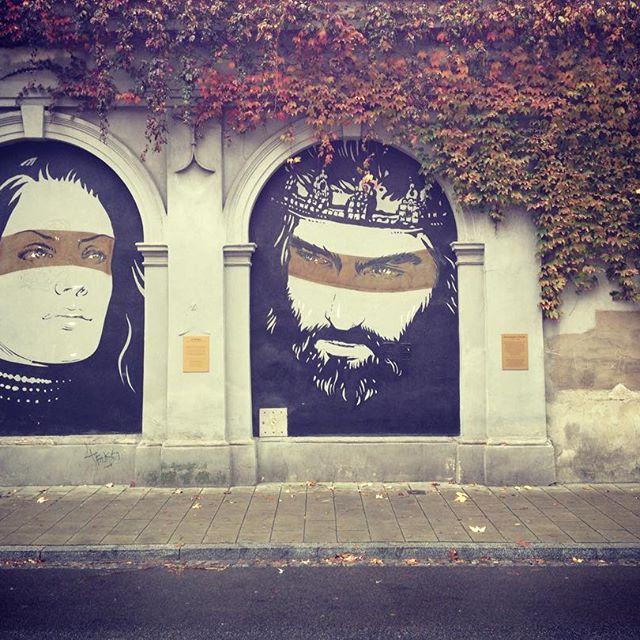
Casimir the Great and Esterka mural

== In literature ==
- Marcin Bielski “Kronika wszystkiego świata” (Chronicle of everything in the World) (1551)
- David Gans Chronicle (1595)
- Ludwig Giesebrecht - "Esther" (from Gedichte vol. XVIII: Buch der Hebräer) (1836)
- Józef Ignacy Kraszewski "Król chłopów" (Peasant King), Book Six
- Yitshak ben Moshe Rumsch "The Book of Esther the Second" (1883)
- Shmuel Yosef Agnon "In Esterka's House"
- Karl Emil Franzos "Esterka Regina" (The Queen Esterka) in "The Jews of Barnow" (1872)
- Aaron Zeitlin "Esterke" (1932)
- Thaddeus Bulgarin “Esterka” (1828)

== In art ==
- Franciszek Żmurko – "Casimir the Great and Esterka" (1891)
- Wandalin Strzałecki – "Casimir the Great and Esterka" (1879, lost)
- Władysław Łuszczkiewicz – "Casimir the Great visiting Esterka"
- Maurycy Gottlieb – "Esterka and King Casimir" (1879)

== In music ==
- Carl Loewe - Esther: A Song-cycle in the form of a Ballad (after Giesebrecht), Op. 52 (1835)

== In historical works ==
- Simon Dubnow – "History of the Jews in Russia and Poland" (1916)
- Chone Shmeruk – "The Esterke Story in Yiddish and Polish Literature"

== See also ==
- Esther
- Chajka
- Esterka, Łódź Voivodeship
- Paradisus Judaeorum
