= Mrozy =

Mrozy may refer to the following places:

- Mrozy, Mińsk County in Masovian Voivodeship (east-central Poland)
- Mrozy, Żyrardów County in Masovian Voivodeship (east-central Poland)
- Mrozy, Pomeranian Voivodeship (north Poland)
