= Zator =

Zator may refer to:

== People ==
- Dominick Zator (born 1994), Canadian football player

== Places ==
- Gmina Zator, Lesser Poland Voivodeship, Poland
- Zator, Lesser Poland Voivodeship, Poland
- Zator, Masovian Voivodeship, Poland
- Zátor, Czech Republic

== Other ==
- Duchy of Zator
- Zator Plus, brand name of Spironolactone
- Zator (retrieval system), a historical information retrieval system
