= Nowy Wylezin =

- Village
- Location within Poland
- Coordinates: 51°51′22″N 20°26′12″E
- Country: Poland
- Voivodeship: Łódź
- County: Skierniewice
- Gmina: Kowiesy

Nowy Wylezin [ˈnɔvɨ vɨˈlɛʑin] is a village in the administrative district of Gmina Kowiesy, within Skierniewice County, Łódź Voivodeship, in central Poland.
