= Długokąty Małe =

- Village
- Location within Poland
- Coordinates: 51°58′58″N 20°18′16″E
- Country: Poland
- Voivodeship: Masovian
- County: Żyrardów
- Gmina: Puszcza Mariańska
- Population: 270

Długokąty Małe [dwuɡɔˈkɔntɨ ˈmawɛ] is a village in the administrative district of Gmina Puszcza Mariańska, within Żyrardów County, Masovian Voivodeship, in east-central Poland.
