= Janów, Skierniewice County =

Janów
- Village
- Location within Poland
- Coordinates: 51°51′50″N 20°27′39″E
- Country: Poland
- Voivodeship: Łódź
- County: Skierniewice
- Gmina: Kowiesy

Janów [ˈjanuf] is a village in the administrative district of Gmina Kowiesy, within Skierniewice County, Łódź Voivodeship, in central Poland.
