= Puszcza Mariańska =

- Village
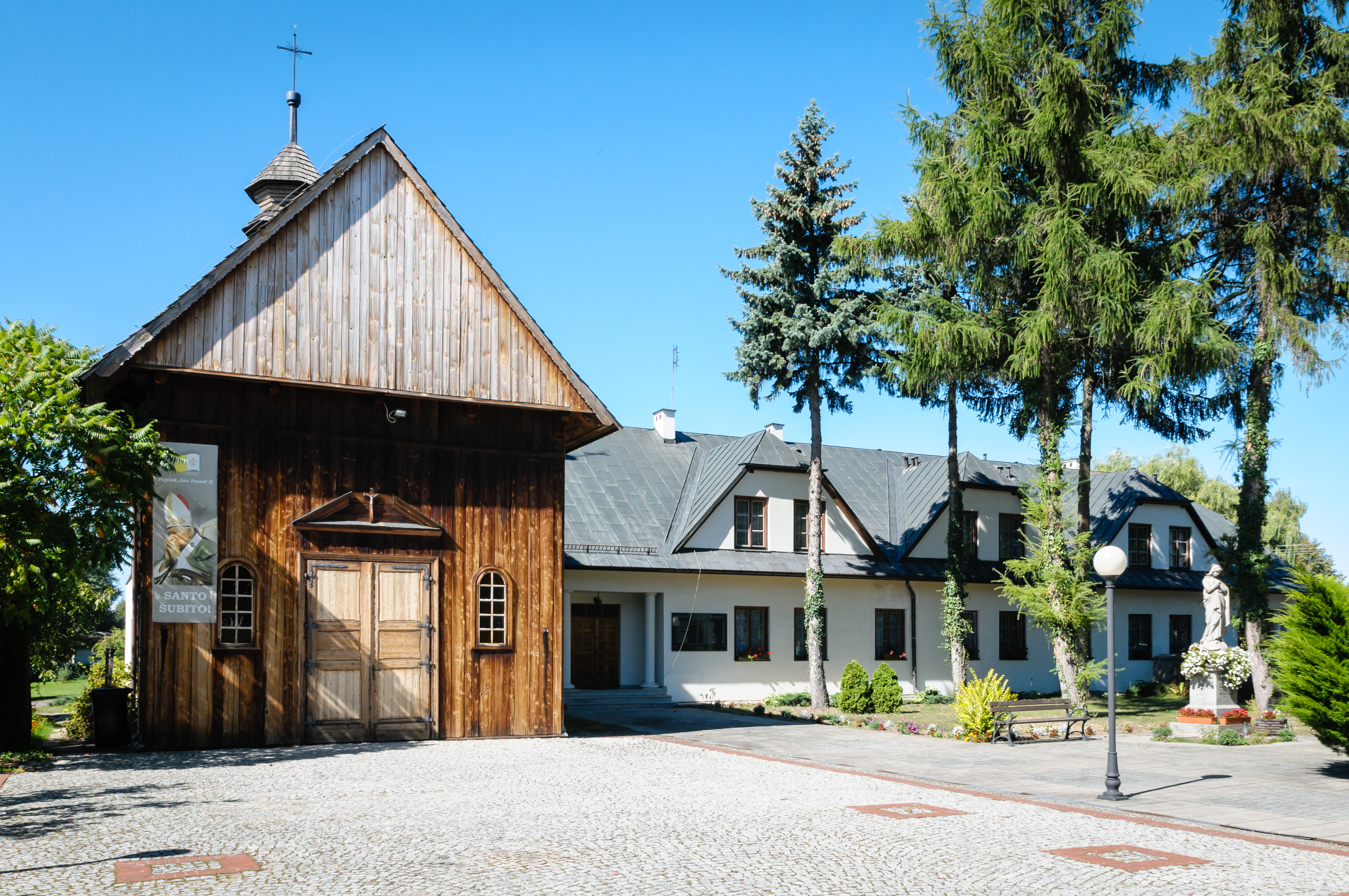
- Church of Saint Michael

- Coat of arms

- Location within Poland
- Coordinates: 51°59′N 20°21′E
- Country: Poland
- Voivodeship: Masovian
- County: Żyrardów
- Gmina: Puszcza Mariańska
- Time zone: UTC+1 (CET)
  - Summer (DST): UTC+2 (CEST)
- Website: https://www.puszcza-marianska.pl/

Puszcza Mariańska [ˈpuʂt͡ʂa maˈrjaɲska] is a village in Żyrardów County, Masovian Voivodeship, in east-central Poland. It is the seat of the gmina (administrative district) called Gmina Puszcza Mariańska.

On 10 August 1683, King John III Sobieski stopped at the local monastery on his way to Vienna. According to the story, the ruler, sleeping under the monastery's linden tree, had a dream of the Virgin Mary, promising him victory at the Battle of Vienna. For his troops, the sun was supposed to shine an hour longer, which was supposed to ensure victory. After the victory at Vienna, the king was supposed to rest here again, which he did. This is confirmed by the gifts left on the way back, including a Turkish saddle cloth from which the cope was made.

Nine Polish citizens were murdered by Nazi Germany in the village during World War II.
