= Gmina Puszcza Mariańska =

Gmina Puszcza Mariańska Puszcza Mariańska Commune
- Gmina
- Coat of arms
- Interactive map of Gmina Puszcza Mariańska
- Coordinates (Puszcza Mariańska): 51°59′N 20°21′E
- Country: Poland
- Voivodeship: Masovian
- County: Żyrardów
- Seat: Puszcza Mariańska

Area
  - Total: 142.41 km^{2} (54.98 sq mi)

Population (2006)
  - Total: 8,411
  - Density: 59.06/km^{2} (153.0/sq mi)
- Website: http://www.puszcza-marianska.pl

Gmina Puszcza Mariańska is a rural gmina (administrative district) in Żyrardów County, Masovian Voivodeship, in east-central Poland. Its seat is the village of Puszcza Mariańska, which lies approximately 10 kilometres (6 mi) south-west of Żyrardów and 52 km (32 mi) south-west of Warsaw.

The gmina covers an area of 142.41 square kilometres (55.0 sq mi), and as of 2006 its total population is 8,411.

The gmina contains part of the protected area called Bolimów Landscape Park.

== Villages ==
Gmina Puszcza Mariańska contains the villages and settlements of Aleksandria, Bartniki, Bednary, Biernik, Budy Wolskie, Budy Zaklasztorne, Budy-Kałki, Długokąty, Długokąty Małe, Emilianów, Górki, Grabina Radziwiłłowska, Huta Partacka, Kamion, Karnice, Korabiewice, Lisowola, Marianów, Michałów, Mrozy, Niemieryczew, Nowa Huta, Nowy Karolinów, Nowy Łajszczew, Olszanka, Pniowe, Puszcza Mariańska, Radziwiłłów, Sapy, Stara Huta, Stary Karolinów, Stary Łajszczew, Studzieniec, Waleriany, Wilczynek, Wincentów, Wola Polska, Wycześniak, Wygoda and Zator.

== Neighbouring gminas ==
Gmina Puszcza Mariańska is bordered by the town of Żyrardów and by the gminas of Bolimów, Kowiesy, Mszczonów, Nowy Kawęczyn, Radziejowice, Skierniewice and Wiskitki.
