= Franciszków, Skierniewice County =

Franciszków
- Village
- Location within Poland
- Coordinates: 51°54′20″N 20°27′30″E
- Country: Poland
- Voivodeship: Łódź
- County: Skierniewice
- Gmina: Kowiesy

Franciszków (Polish pronunciation: [fraɲˈt͡ɕiʂkuf]) is a village in the administrative district of Gmina Kowiesy, within Skierniewice County, Łódź Voivodeship, in central Poland.
