= Chajka =

Mistress of the Polish king Stanisław August Poniatowski

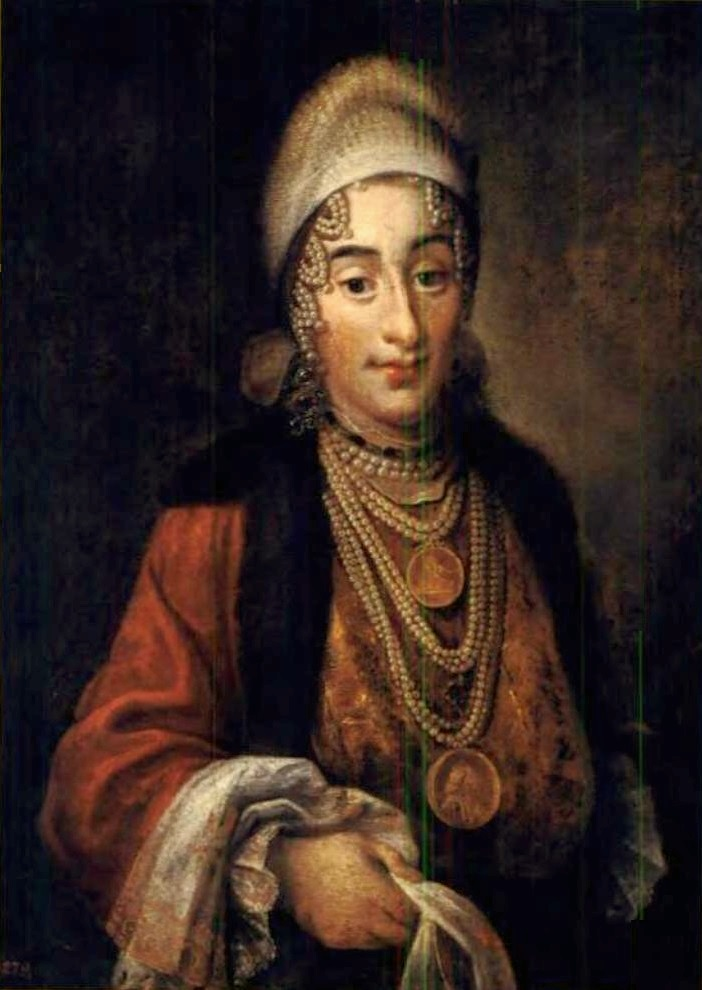
Chajka

Chajka (Czajka) (d. after 14 November 1781), mistress of the Polish king Stanisław August Poniatowski. She was a Pole of Jewish ancestry.

She was daughter of the Jewish merchant Abramek Lwowski (Abramek of Lwów) and lived in Żwaniec. In 1781, her portrait was painted by the court painter, Krzysztof Radzwiłłowski. Czajka had a daughter named Elia (Ella).

== See also ==
- Esterka
- Paradisus Judaeorum
