= Wola Polska, Żyrardów County =

Wola Polska
- Village
- Location within Poland
- Coordinates: 51°58′09″N 20°23′16″E
- Country: Poland
- Voivodeship: Masovian
- County: Żyrardów
- Gmina: Puszcza Mariańska

Wola Polska [ˈvɔla ˈpɔlska] is a village in the administrative district of Gmina Puszcza Mariańska, within Żyrardów County, Masovian Voivodeship, in east-central Poland.
