= Wymysłów, Skierniewice County =

Wymysłów
- Village
- Location within Poland
- Coordinates: 51°53′14″N 20°25′29″E
- Country: Poland
- Voivodeship: Łódź
- County: Skierniewice
- Gmina: Kowiesy

Wymysłów [vɨˈmɨswuf] is a village in the administrative district of Gmina Kowiesy, within Skierniewice County, Łódź Voivodeship, in central Poland.
