= Jakubów, Skierniewice County =

Jakubów
- Village
- Location within Poland
- Coordinates: 51°52′12″N 20°30′22″E
- Country: Poland
- Voivodeship: Łódź
- County: Skierniewice
- Gmina: Kowiesy

Jakubów [jaˈkubuf] is a village in the administrative district of Gmina Kowiesy, within Skierniewice County, Łódź Voivodeship, in central Poland.
