= Stary Wylezin =

- Village
- Location within Poland
- Coordinates: 51°52′34″N 20°25′52″E
- Country: Poland
- Voivodeship: Łódź
- County: Skierniewice
- Gmina: Kowiesy

Stary Wylezin [ˈstarɨ vɨˈlɛʑin] is a village in the administrative district of Gmina Kowiesy, within Skierniewice County, Łódź Voivodeship, in central Poland.
