= Studzieniec, Żyrardów County =

Studzieniec
- Village
- Location within Poland
- Coordinates: 51°59′N 20°23′E
- Country: Poland
- Voivodeship: Masovian
- County: Żyrardów
- Gmina: Puszcza Mariańska
- Population: 240

Studzieniec [stuˈd͡ʑɛɲɛt͡s] is a village in the administrative district of Gmina Puszcza Mariańska, within Żyrardów County, Masovian Voivodeship, in east-central Poland.
