= Kowiesy, Łódź Voivodeship =

Kowiesy
- Village
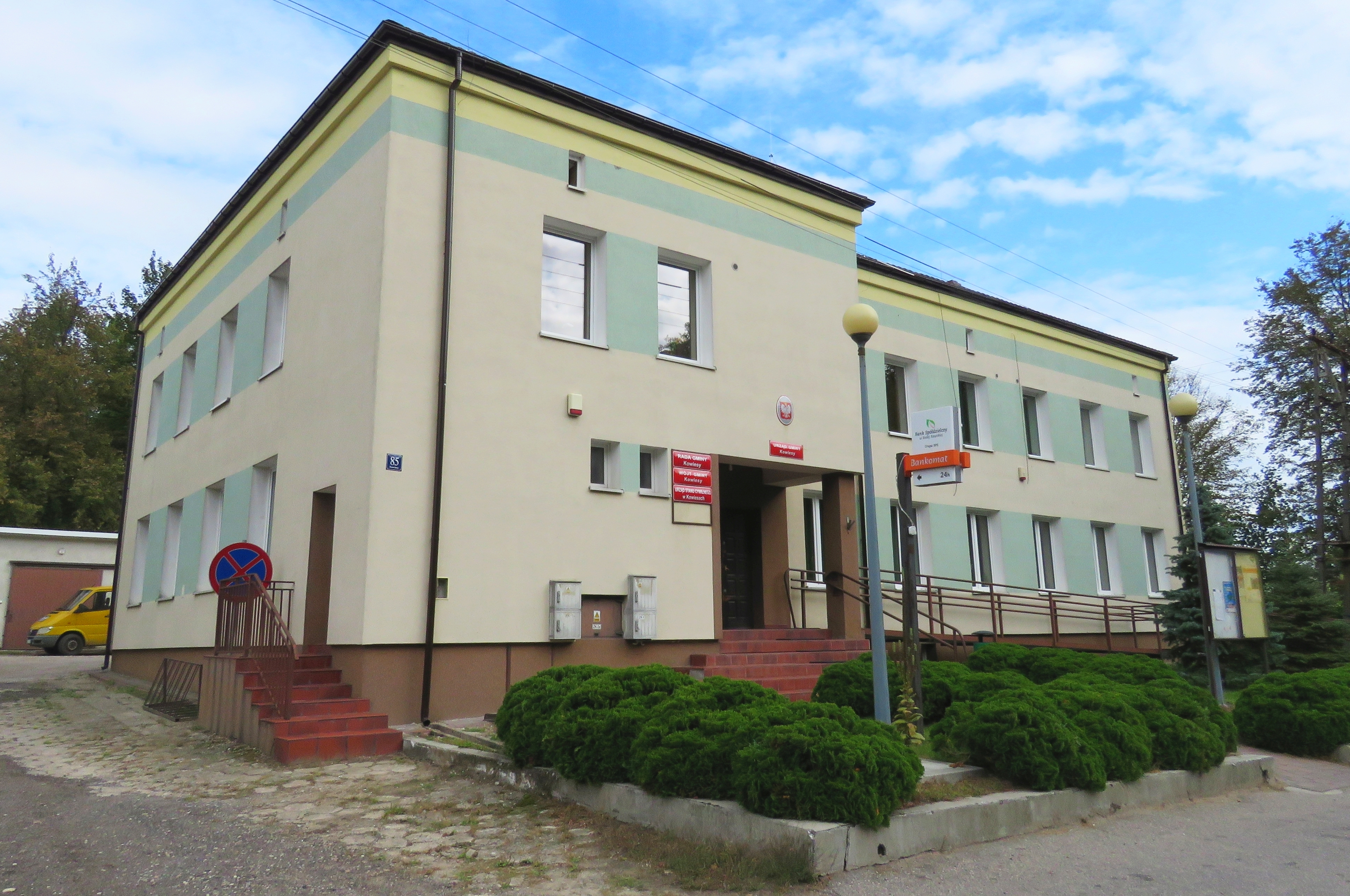
- Gmina Kowiesy administration building

- Location within Poland
- Coordinates: 51°53′24″N 20°25′20″E
- Country: Poland
- Voivodeship: Łódź
- County: Skierniewice
- Gmina: Kowiesy

Population (approx.)
  - Total: 150

Kowiesy [kɔˈvjɛsɨ] is a village in Skierniewice County, Łódź Voivodeship, in central Poland. It is the seat of the gmina (administrative district) called Gmina Kowiesy.

The village has an approximate population of 150.
