= Stara Huta, Żyrardów County =

Stara Huta
- Village
- Location within Poland
- Coordinates: 51°58′52″N 20°24′07″E
- Country: Poland
- Voivodeship: Masovian
- County: Żyrardów
- Gmina: Puszcza Mariańska

Stara Huta [ˈstara ˈxuta] is a village in the administrative district of Gmina Puszcza Mariańska, within Żyrardów County, Masovian Voivodeship, in east-central Poland.
