= Radziwiłłów, Masovian Voivodeship =

Radziwiłłów
- Village
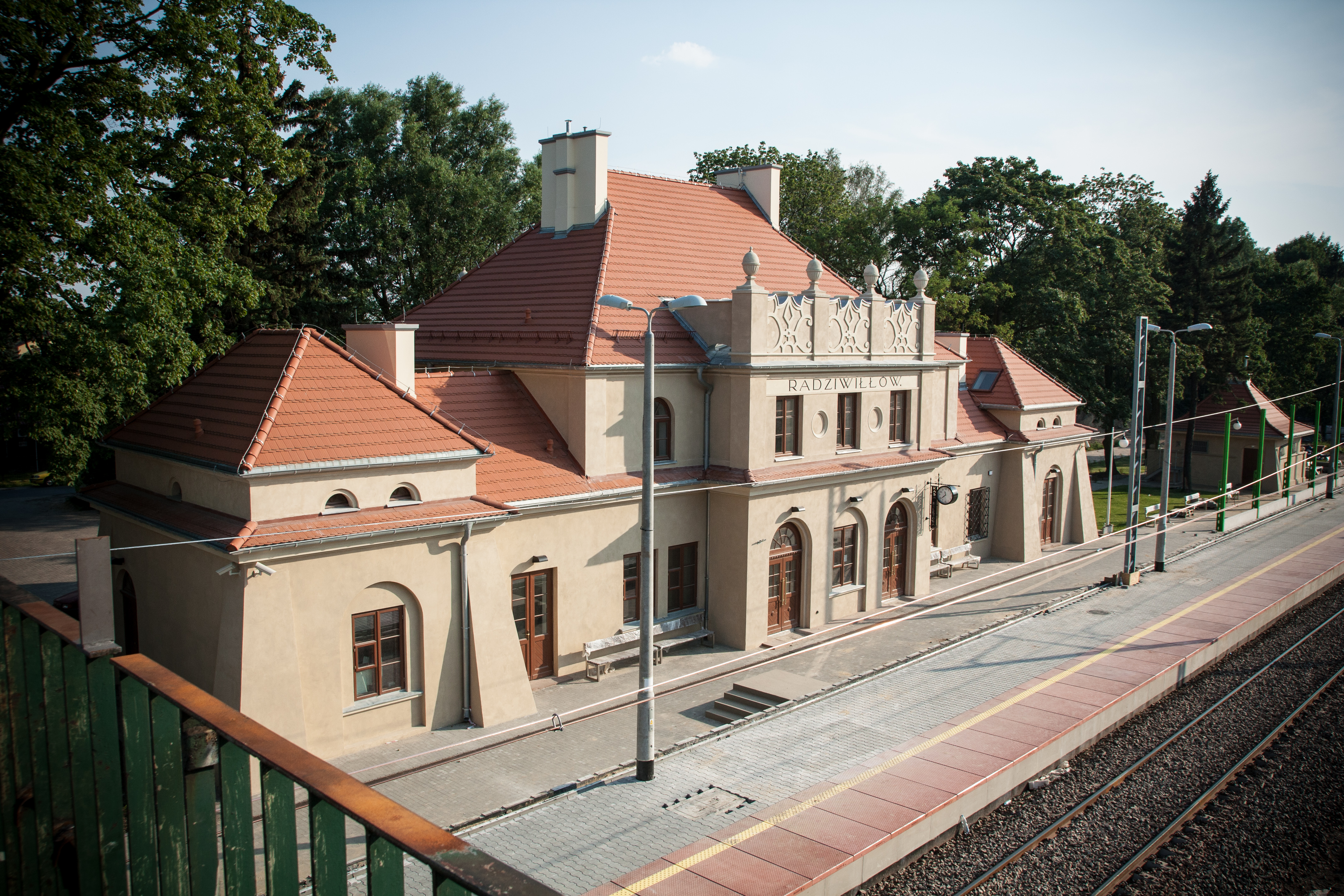
- Train station in Radziwiłłów

- Location within Poland
- Coordinates: 52°0′N 20°17′E
- Country: Poland
- Voivodeship: Masovian
- County: Żyrardów
- Gmina: Puszcza Mariańska
- Population: 800

Radziwiłłów [rad͡ʑiˈviu̯wuf] is a village in the administrative district of Gmina Puszcza Mariańska, within Żyrardów County, Masovian Voivodeship, in east-central Poland.
