= Gmina Kowiesy =

Gmina Kowiesy Kowiesy Commune
- Gmina
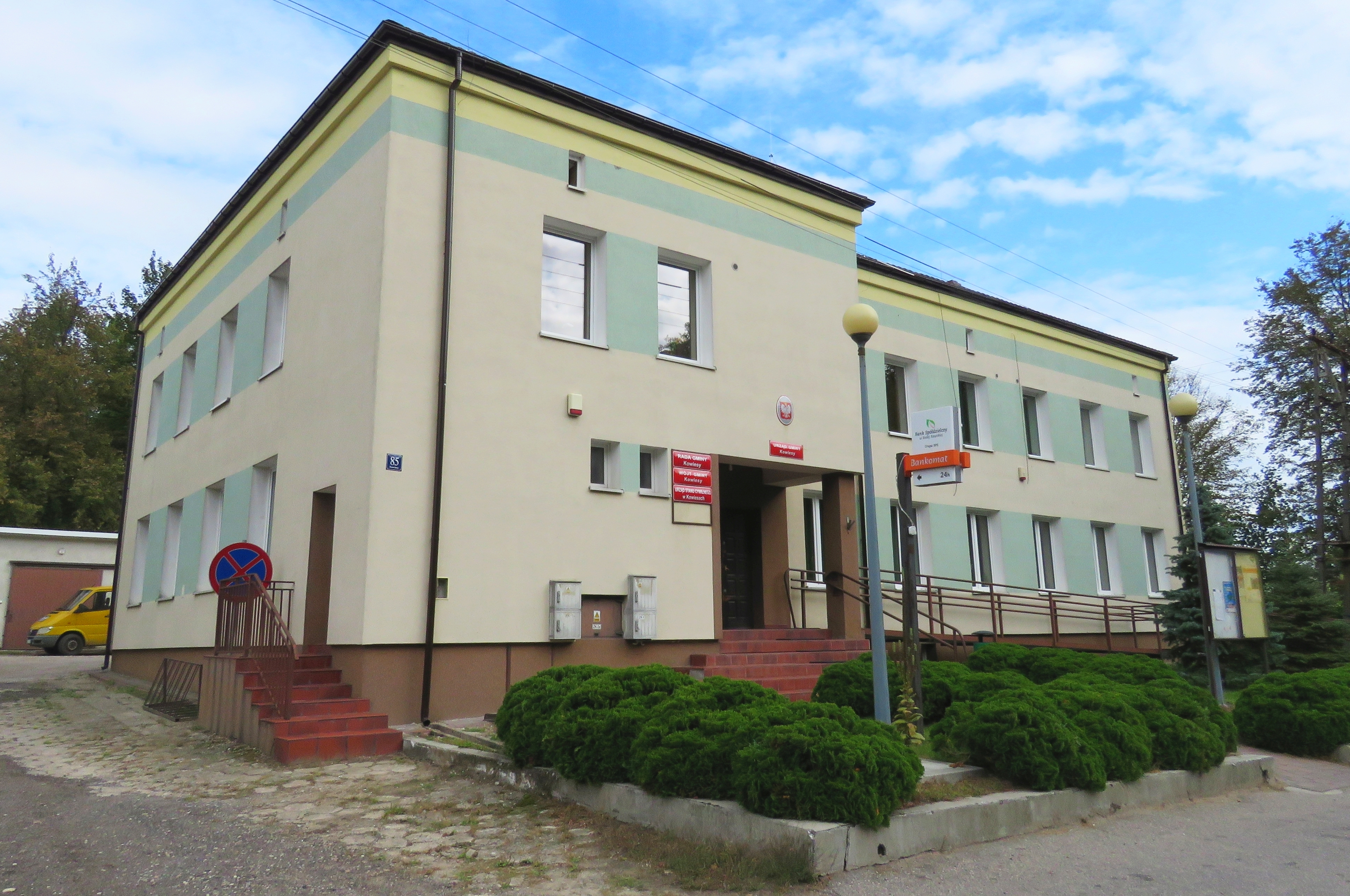
- Municipal office

- Coat of arms
- Interactive map of Gmina Kowiesy
- Coordinates (Kowiesy): 51°53′N 20°25′E
- Country: Poland
- Voivodeship: Łódź
- County: Skierniewice County
- Seat: Kowiesy

Area
  - Total: 85.63 km^{2} (33.06 sq mi)

Population (2006)
  - Total: 3,035
  - Density: 35.44/km^{2} (91.80/sq mi)
- Time zone: UTC+1 (CET)
  - Summer (DST): UTC+2 (CEST)
- Website: www.kowiesy.pl

Gmina Kowiesy is a rural gmina (administrative district) in Skierniewice County, Łódź Voivodeship, in central Poland. Its seat is the village of Kowiesy, which lies approximately 21 kilometres (13 mi) east of Skierniewice and 67 km (42 mi) east of the regional capital Łódź.

The gmina covers an area of 85.63 square kilometres (33.1 sq mi), and as of 2006, its total population was 3,035.

The gmina contains part of the protected area called Bolimów Landscape Park.

== Villages ==
Gmina Kowiesy contains the villages and settlements of:

- Borszyce
- Budy Chojnackie
- Chełmce
- Chojnata
- Chojnatka
- Chrzczonowice
- Franciszków
- Jakubów
- Janów
- Jeruzal
- Kowiesy
- Lisna
- Michałowice
- Nowy Lindów
- Nowy Wylezin
- Paplin
- Paplinek
- Pękoszew
- Stary Wylezin
- Turowa Wola
- Ulaski
- Wędrogów
- Wola Pękoszewska
- Wólka Jeruzalska
- Wycinka Wolska
- Wymysłów
- Zawady

== Neighbouring gminas ==
Gmina Kowiesy is bordered by the gminas of Biała Rawska, Mszczonów, Nowy Kawęczyn and Puszcza Mariańska.
