= Marianów, Żyrardów County =

Marianów
- Village
- Location within Poland
- Coordinates: 51°58′21″N 20°20′31″E
- Country: Poland
- Voivodeship: Masovian
- County: Żyrardów
- Gmina: Puszcza Mariańska

Marianów [maˈrjanuf] is a village in the administrative district of Gmina Puszcza Mariańska, within Żyrardów County, Masovian Voivodeship, in east-central Poland.
