= Kamion, Żyrardów County =

Kamion
- Village
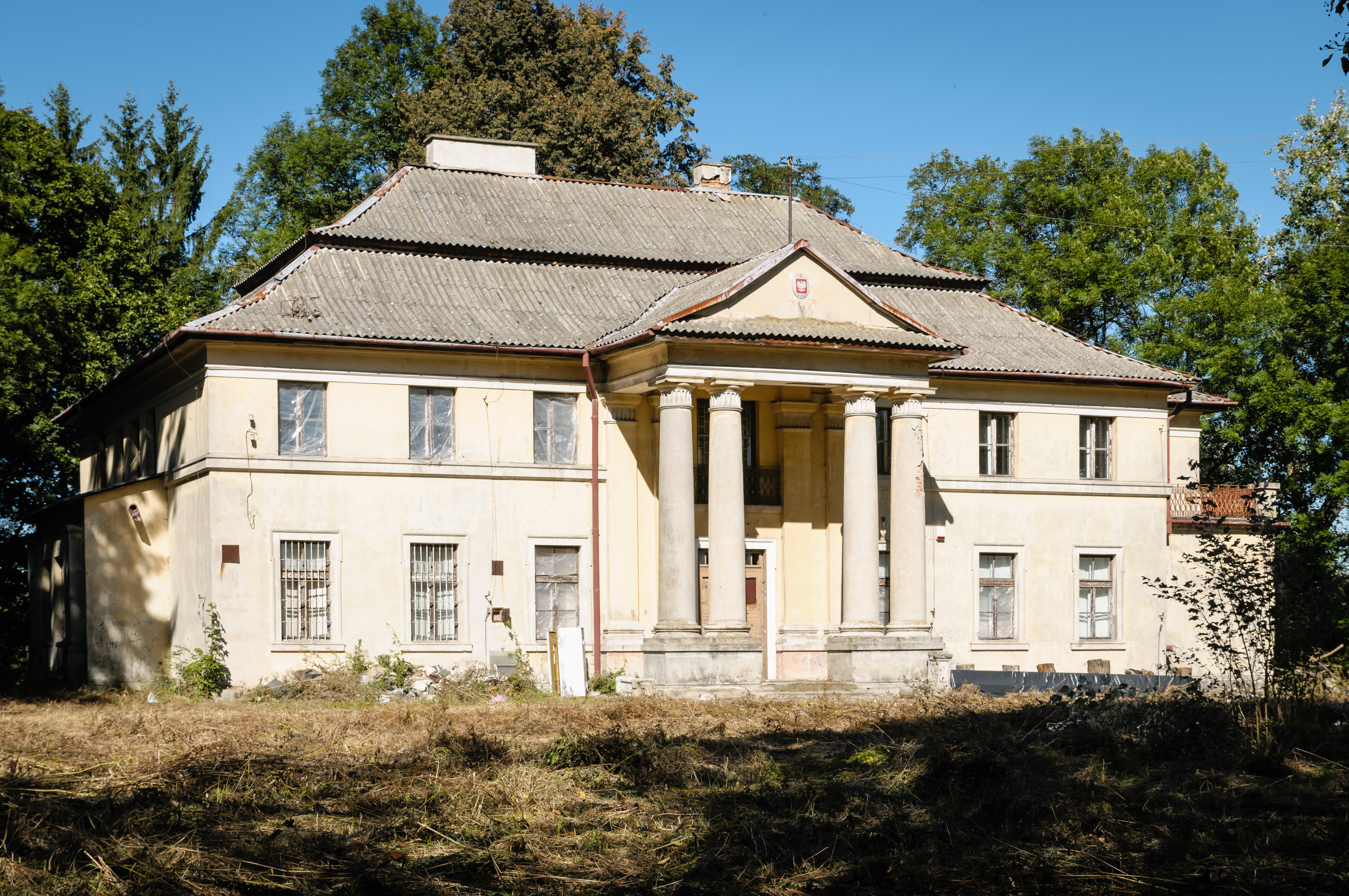
- Palace in Kamion

- Location within Poland
- Coordinates: 51°56′38″N 20°15′39″E
- Country: Poland
- Voivodeship: Masovian
- County: Żyrardów
- Gmina: Puszcza Mariańska

Population
  - Total: 440
- Time zone: UTC+1 (CET)
  - Summer (DST): UTC+2 (CEST)
- Vehicle registration: WZY

Kamion [ˈkamjɔn] is a village in the administrative district of Gmina Puszcza Mariańska, within Żyrardów County, Masovian Voivodeship, in central Poland.

Nine Polish citizens were murdered by Nazi Germany in the village during World War II.
