= Bednary, Masovian Voivodeship =

Bednary, Poland
- Village
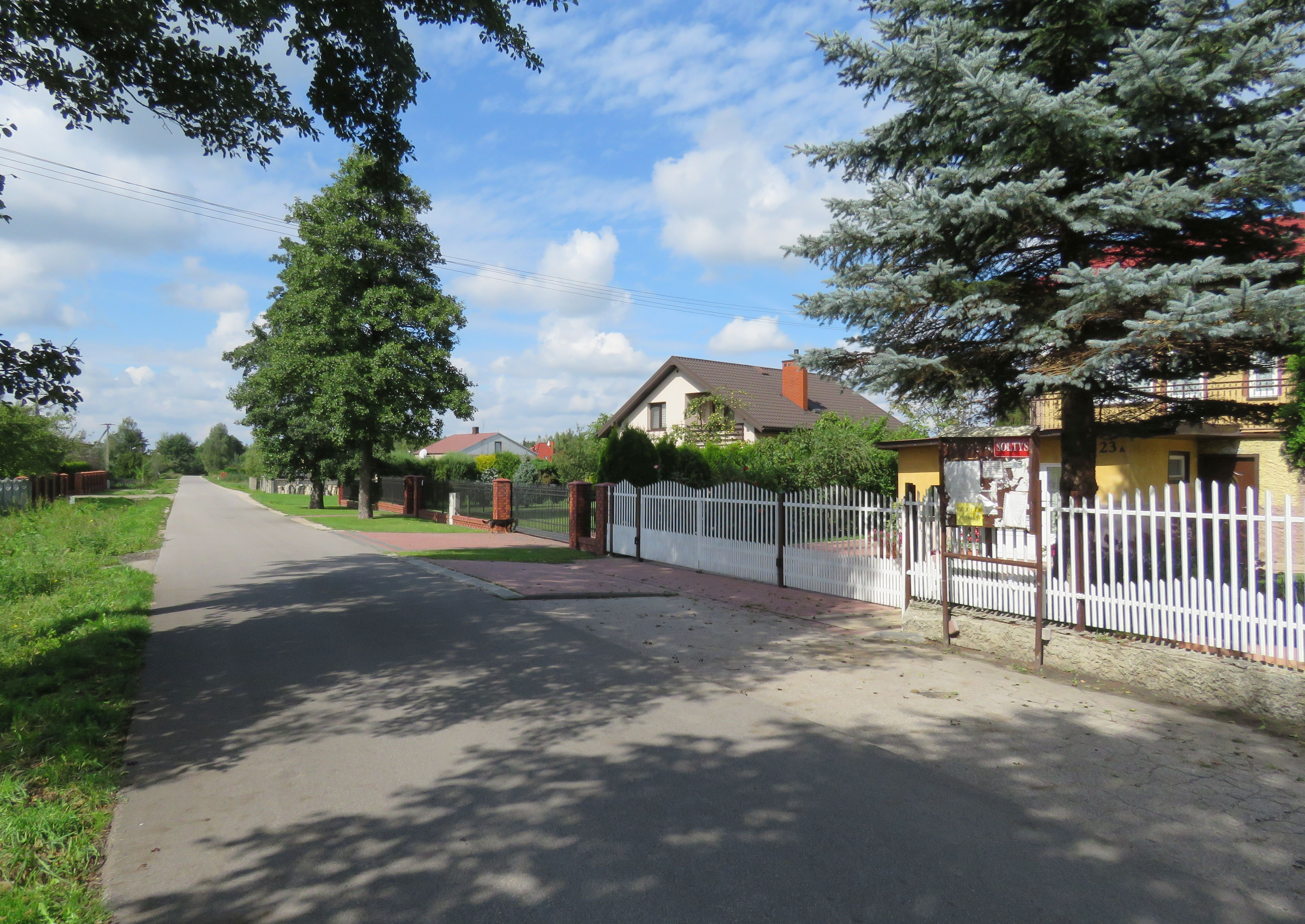

- Location within Poland
- Coordinates: 52°1′N 20°23′E
- Country: Poland
- Voivodeship: Masovian
- County: Żyrardów
- Gmina: Puszcza Mariańska

Bednary [bɛdˈnarɨ] is a village in the administrative district of Gmina Puszcza Mariańska, within Żyrardów County, Masovian Voivodeship, in east-central Poland.

== See also ==
- Bednář, a list of similarly named people and places
