= Wędrogów =

- Village
- Location within Poland
- Coordinates: 51°53′20″N 20°24′58″E
- Country: Poland
- Voivodeship: Łódź
- County: Skierniewice
- Gmina: Kowiesy
- Population (approx.): 140

Wędrogów [vɛnˈdrɔɡuf] is a village in the administrative district of Gmina Kowiesy, within Skierniewice County, Łódź Voivodeship, in central Poland.

The village has an approximate population of 140.
