= Isaac Rumsch =

Lithuanian Hebrew writer (1822–1894)

- Born: 6 April 1822; Zezemer, Vilna Governorate, Russian Empire
- Died: 21 August 1894 (aged 72); Vilnius
- Occupation: Writer
- Writing career
- Language: Hebrew, German
- Literary movement: Haskalah

Isaac ben Moses Rumsch (Hebrew: יצחק בן־משה רומש, romanized: Yitsḥaḳ ben-Mosheh Rumsh; 6 April 1822 – 21 August 1894) was a Lithuanian Hebrew writer, translator, and educator.

== Biography ==
Title page of Kin'at sifre kodesh (1873)

Isaac Rumsch was born in the village of Zezemer. At the age of nine he went to Vilna, where he studied the Talmud in the yeshiva of his brother Joseph Rumsch, and then in that of Rabbi Mordecai Melzer. Subsequently he acquired a knowledge of German and other secular subjects; but his plan of going to Germany to obtain a scientific education was frustrated by his disapproving relatives. When in 1853 the Russian government opened public schools for Jewish children in the government of Vilna, he, together with his friend Judah Löb Gordon, was appointed a teacher in the school of Ponevyezh.

Besides numerous novels, he contributed articles to Ha-Karmel and Ha-Melitz and left in manuscript some Hebrew stories and notes on the Bible.

== Publications ==
- Kur 'oni. Vilna. 1861. A free Hebrew translation of Robinson Crusoe from the German of Franz Rauch.
- Kin'at sifre kodesh. Vilna. 1873. Critical glosses on Leon Mandelstamm's Russian translation of the Psalms, together with notes on some of them.
- Shelumat resha'im. Vilna: Lipman. 1875. hdl:2027/nnc1.cu58945199. A story of Jewish life, published alongside the Hebrew novel Ḥatikhat bad.
- Megillat Ester ha-sheniyah. Vilna: Lipman. 1883. A historical novel of Esterka, the mistress Polish king Casimir the Great.
- "Bat-ḥayil". Ha-Asif. 5: 1–47. 1889. A historical novel of Jewish life in Spain in the fourteenth century, freely translated from Ludwig Philippson.
- Seʻar she-be-ishah. Vilna: Romm. 1894.
