= Bartniki, Żyrardów County =

Bartniki
- Village
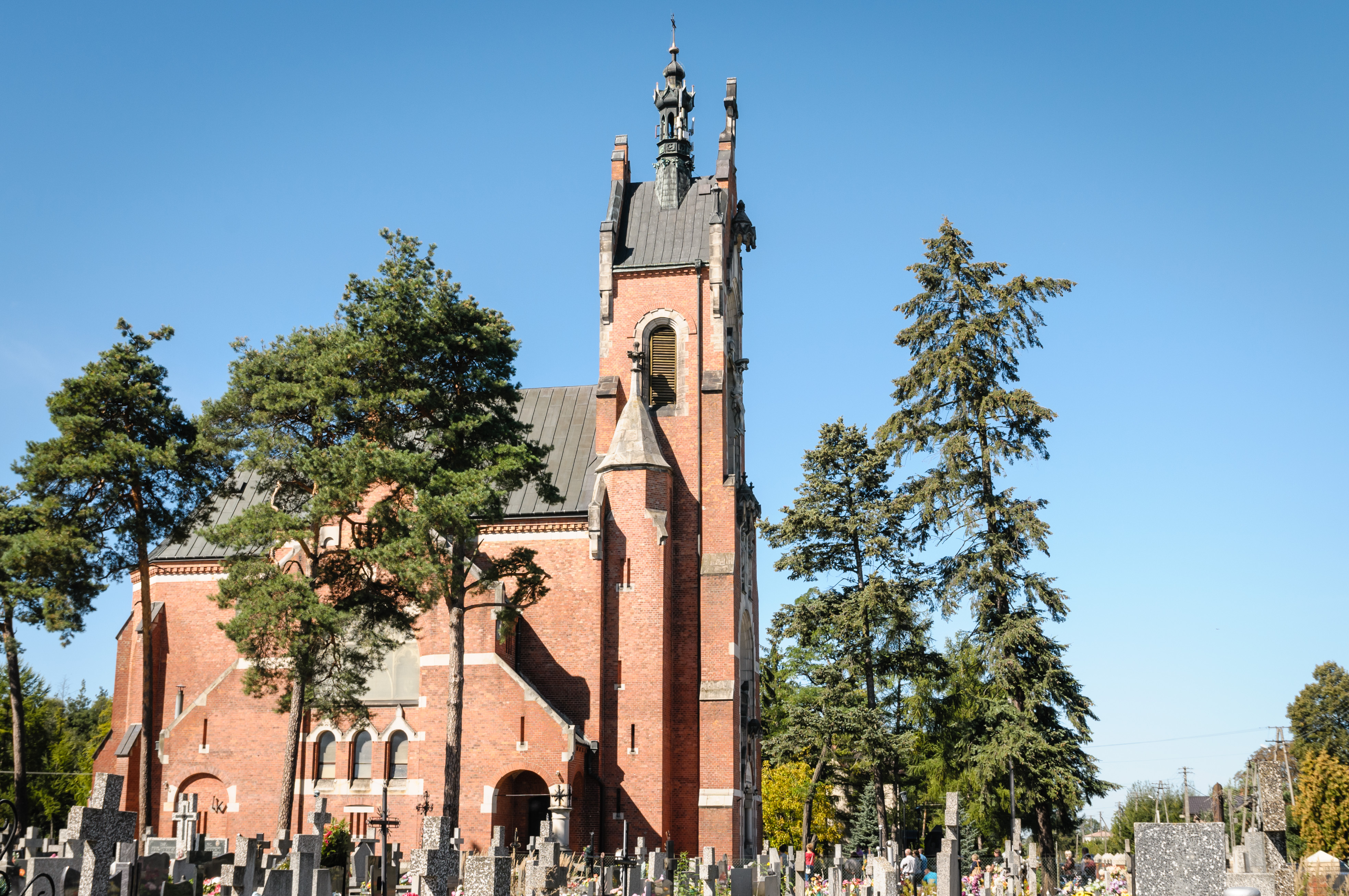
- Saint Anthony church in Bartniki

- Location within Poland
- Coordinates: 52°0′38″N 20°15′0″E
- Country: Poland
- Voivodeship: Masovian
- County: Żyrardów
- Gmina: Puszcza Mariańska

Population
  - Total: 1,300
- Time zone: UTC+1 (CET)
  - Summer (DST): UTC+2 (CEST)
- Vehicle registration: WZY

Bartniki [bartˈniki] is a village in the administrative district of Gmina Puszcza Mariańska, within Żyrardów County, Masovian Voivodeship, in central Poland.

Five Polish citizens were murdered by Nazi Germany in the village during World War II.
