= Grabina Radziwiłłowska =

Village in Gmina Puszcza Mariańska, Poland

- Village
- Location within Poland
- Coordinates: 52°00′25″N 20°16′46″E
- Country: Poland
- Voivodeship: Masovian
- County: Żyrardów
- Gmina: Puszcza Mariańska

Grabina Radziwiłłowska [ɡraˈbina rad͡ʑiviu̯ˈwɔfska] is a village in the administrative district of Gmina Puszcza Mariańska, within Żyrardów County, Masovian Voivodeship, in east-central Poland.
