= Aleksandria, Żyrardów County =

Aleksandria
- Village
- Location within Poland
- Coordinates: 52°0′20″N 20°25′15″E
- Country: Poland
- Voivodeship: Masovian
- County: Żyrardów
- Gmina: Puszcza Mariańska
- Population: 190
- Time zone: UTC+1 (CET)
  - Summer (DST): UTC+2 (CEST)
- Postal code: 96-330
- ISO 3166 code: POL
- Vehicle registration: WZY

Aleksandria [alɛkˈsandrja] is a village in the administrative district of Gmina Puszcza Mariańska, within Żyrardów County, Masovian Voivodeship, in east-central Poland.
