= Zawady, Skierniewice County =

Zawady
- Village
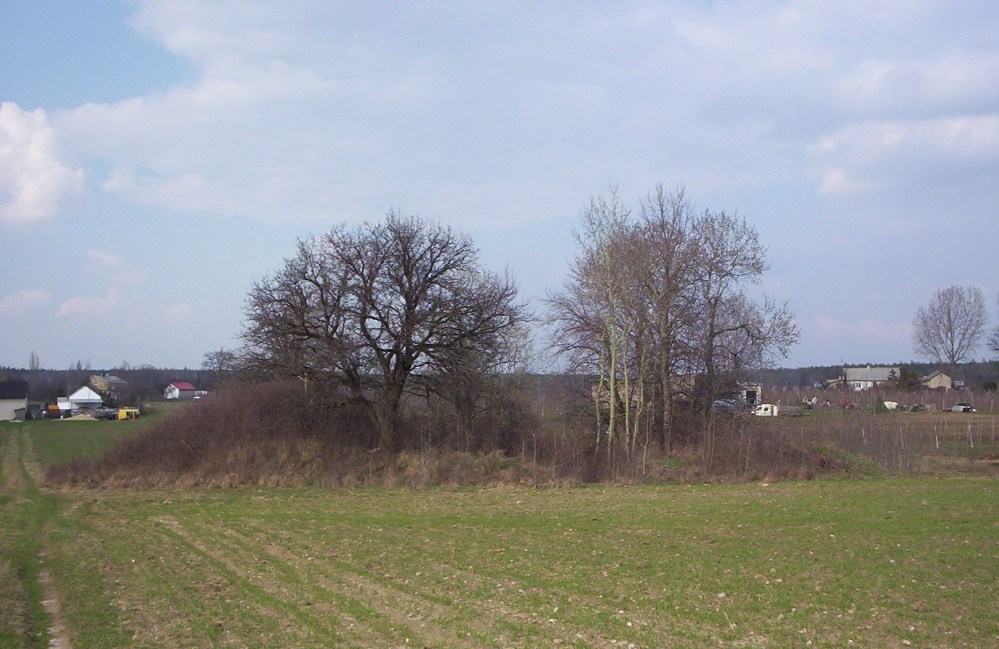

- Location within Poland
- Coordinates: 51°54′39″N 20°27′25″E
- Country: Poland
- Voivodeship: Łódź
- County: Skierniewice
- Gmina: Kowiesy
- Population (approx.): 120

Zawady [zaˈvadɨ] is a village in the administrative district of Gmina Kowiesy, within Skierniewice County, Łódź Voivodeship, in central Poland.

The village has an approximate population of 120.
