= Wygoda, Żyrardów County =

Wygoda
- Village
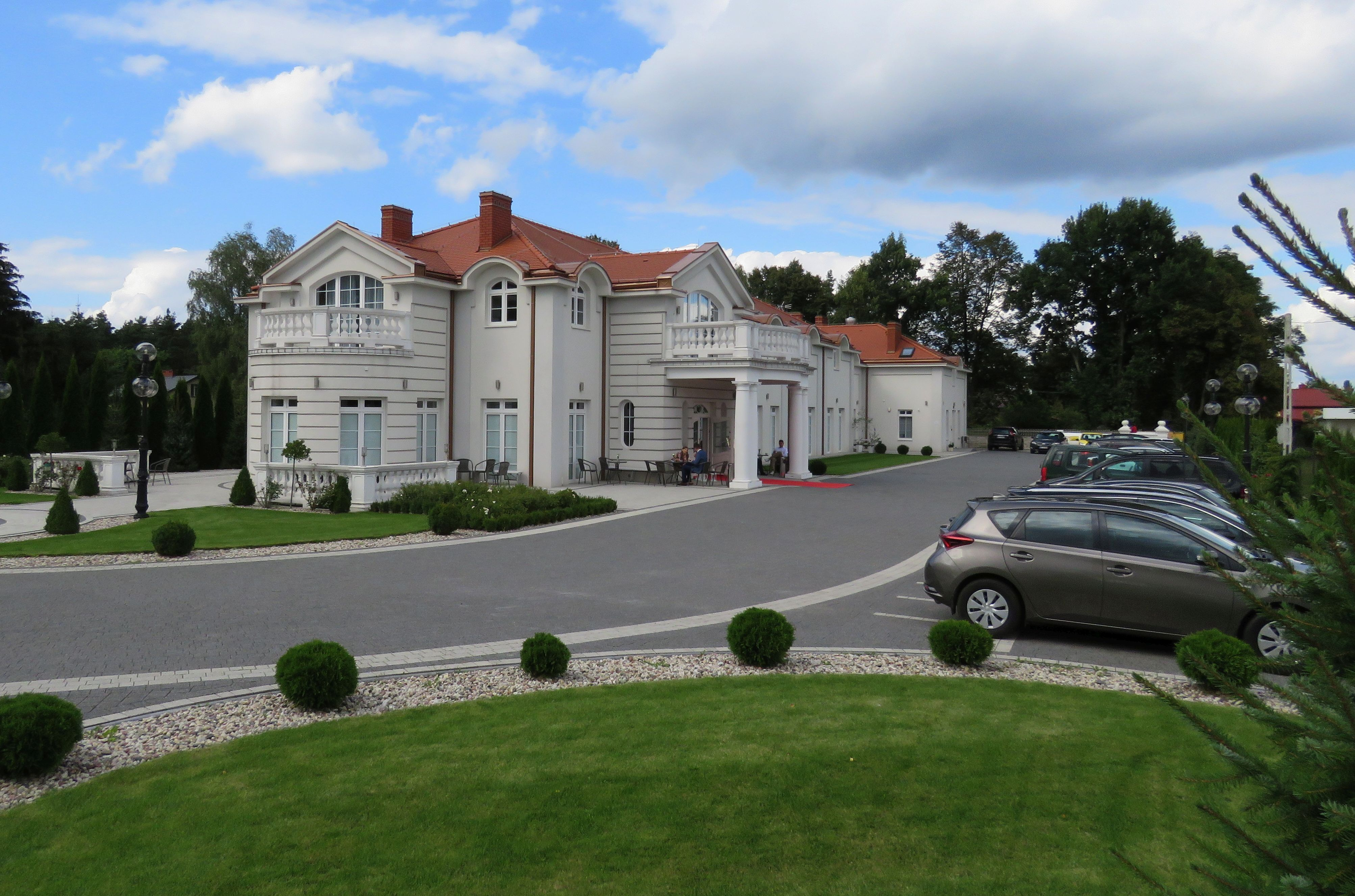

- Location within Poland
- Coordinates: 51°58′10″N 20°20′22″E
- Country: Poland
- Voivodeship: Masovian
- County: Żyrardów
- Gmina: Puszcza Mariańska

Wygoda [vɨˈɡɔda] is a village in the administrative district of Gmina Puszcza Mariańska, within Żyrardów County, Masovian Voivodeship, in east-central Poland.
