= Michałowice, Łódź Voivodeship =

Michałowice
- Village
- Location within Poland
- Coordinates: 51°52′25″N 20°27′38″E
- Country: Poland
- Voivodeship: Łódź
- County: Skierniewice
- Gmina: Kowiesy

Michałowice [mixawɔˈvit͡sɛ] is a village in the administrative district of Gmina Kowiesy, within Skierniewice County, Łódź Voivodeship, in central Poland.
