= Budy-Kałki =

- Village
- Location within Poland
- Coordinates: 51°58′N 20°18′E
- Country: Poland
- Voivodeship: Masovian
- County: Żyrardów
- Gmina: Puszcza Mariańska

Budy-Kałki [ˈbudɨ ˈkau̯ki] is a village in the administrative district of Gmina Puszcza Mariańska, within Żyrardów County, Masovian Voivodeship, in east-central Poland.
