= Pniowe =

- Village
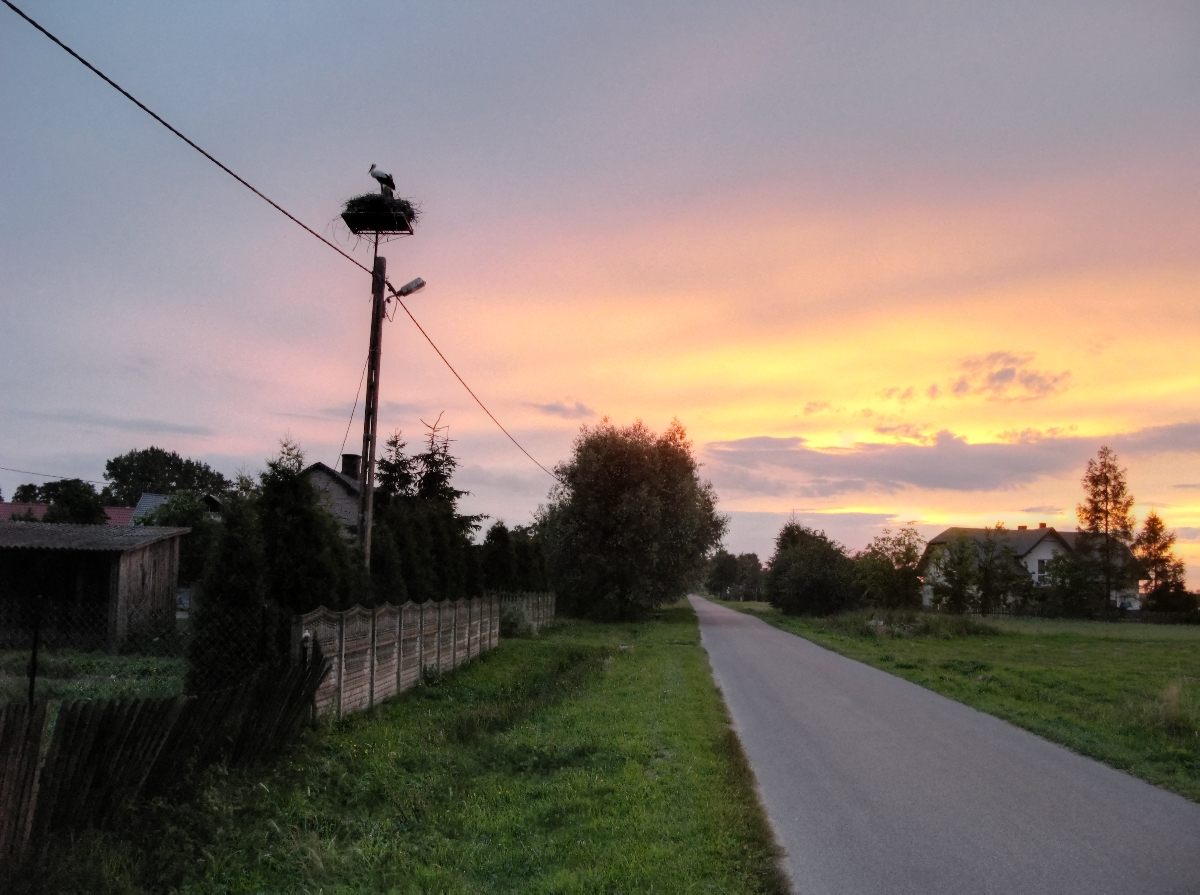
- View of a road in Pniowe

- Location within Poland
- Coordinates: 52°00′27″N 20°24′24″E
- Country: Poland
- Voivodeship: Masovian
- County: Żyrardów
- Gmina: Puszcza Mariańska

Pniowe [ˈpɲɔvɛ] is a village in the administrative district of Gmina Puszcza Mariańska, within Żyrardów County, Masovian Voivodeship, in east-central Poland.
