= Budy Chojnackie =

- Village
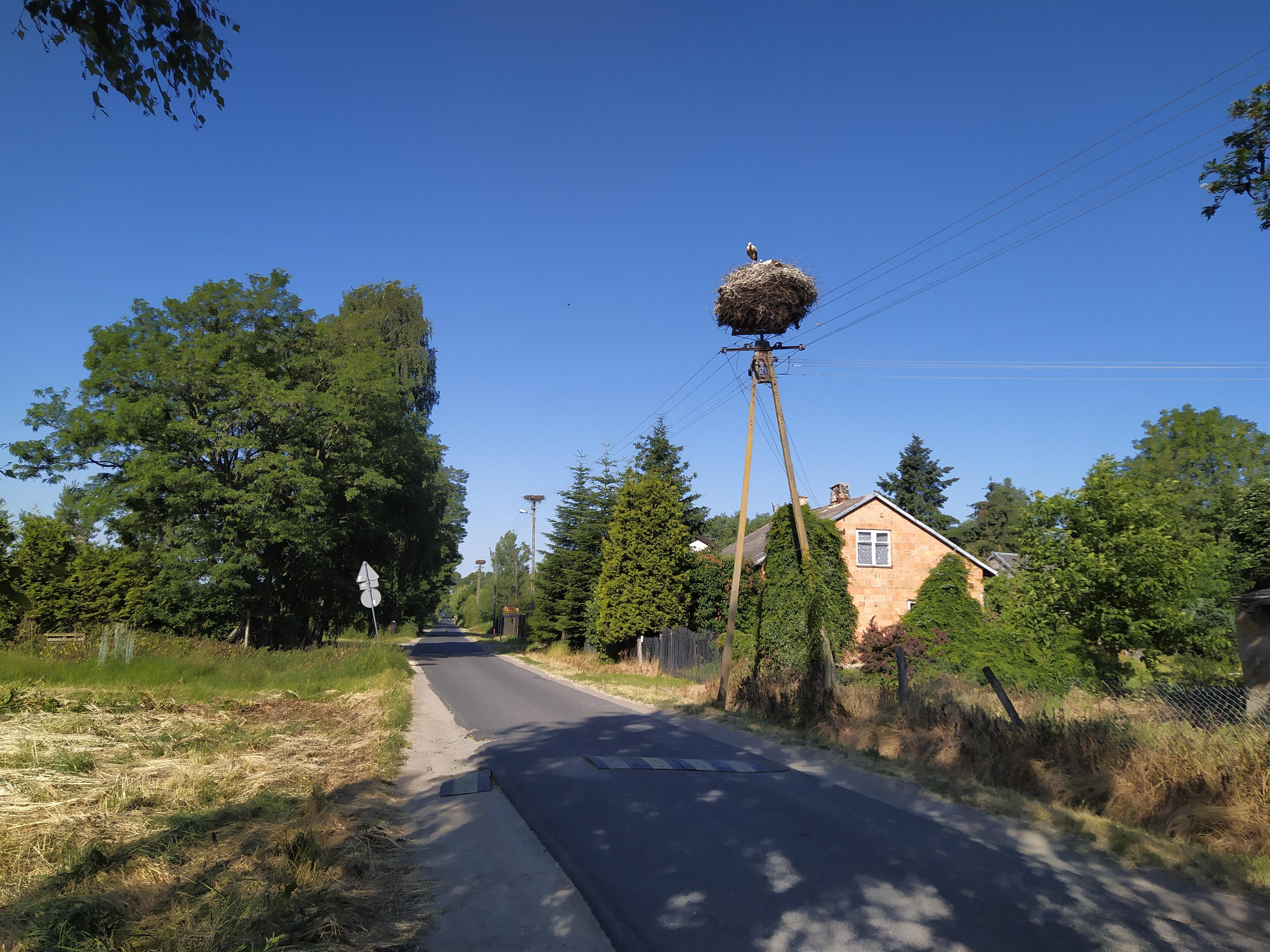

- Location within Poland
- Coordinates: 51°53′29″N 20°28′59″E
- Country: Poland
- Voivodeship: Łódź
- County: Skierniewice
- Gmina: Kowiesy

Budy Chojnackie [ˈbudɨ xɔi̯ˈnat͡skʲɛ] is a village in the administrative district of Gmina Kowiesy, within Skierniewice County, Łódź Voivodeship, in central Poland.
