= Nowy Lindów =

- Village
- Location within Poland
- Coordinates: 51°53′19″N 20°30′30″E
- Country: Poland
- Voivodeship: Łódź
- County: Skierniewice
- Gmina: Kowiesy

Nowy Lindów [ˈnɔvɨ ˈlinduf] is a village in the administrative district of Gmina Kowiesy, within Skierniewice County, Łódź Voivodeship, in central Poland.
