= Lisowola =

- Village
- Location within Poland
- Coordinates: 51°57′N 20°20′E
- Country: Poland
- Voivodeship: Masovian
- County: Żyrardów
- Gmina: Puszcza Mariańska

Lisowola [lisɔˈvɔla] is a village in the administrative district of Gmina Puszcza Mariańska, within Żyrardów County, Masovian Voivodeship, in east-central Poland.
