= Chojnata =

- Village
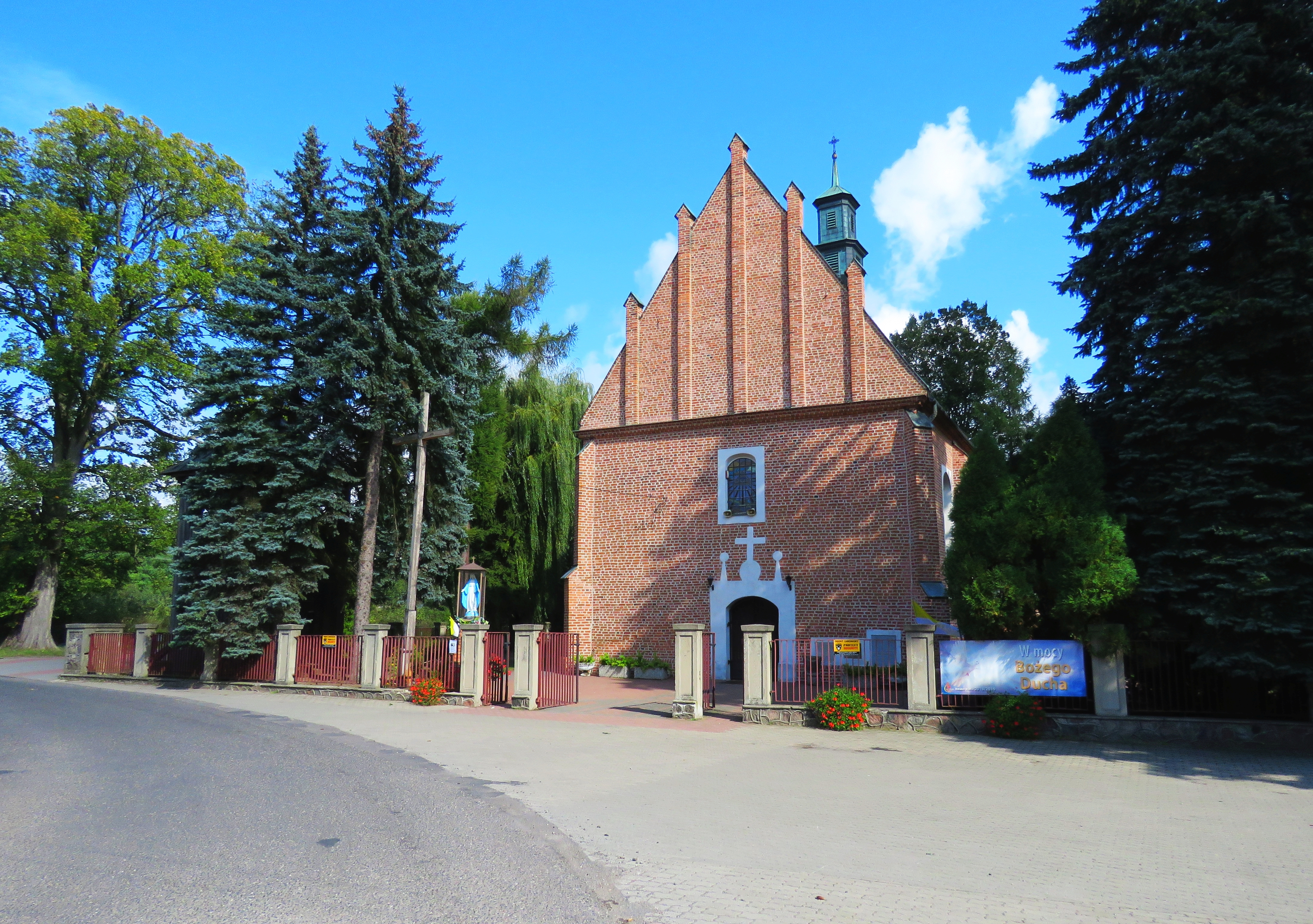
- Church of Saint Martin

- Location within Poland
- Coordinates: 51°54′N 20°27′E
- Country: Poland
- Voivodeship: Łódź
- County: Skierniewice
- Gmina: Kowiesy

Population (approx.)
  - Total: 110

Chojnata [xɔi̯ˈnata] is a village in the administrative district of Gmina Kowiesy, within Skierniewice County, Łódź Voivodeship, in central Poland.

The village has an approximate population of 110.
