= Doleck =

- Village
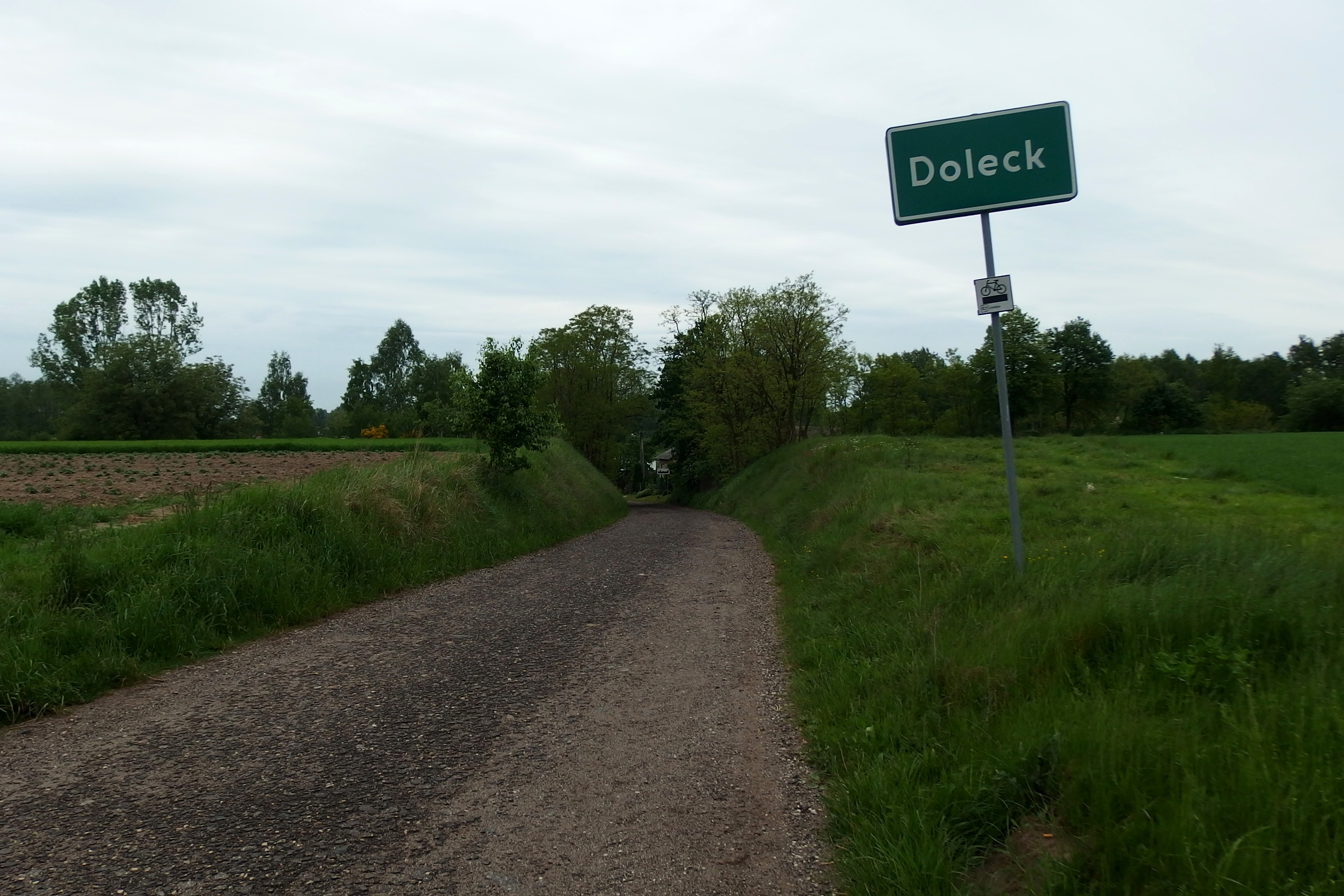

- Location within Poland
- Coordinates: 51°53′55″N 20°18′18″E
- Country: Poland
- Voivodeship: Łódź
- County: Skierniewice
- Gmina: Nowy Kawęczyn
- Population (approx.): 140

Doleck [ˈdɔlɛt͡sk] is a village in the administrative district of Gmina Nowy Kawęczyn, within Skierniewice County, Łódź Voivodeship, in central Poland.

The village has an approximate population of 140.
