= Nowy Łajszczew =

- Village
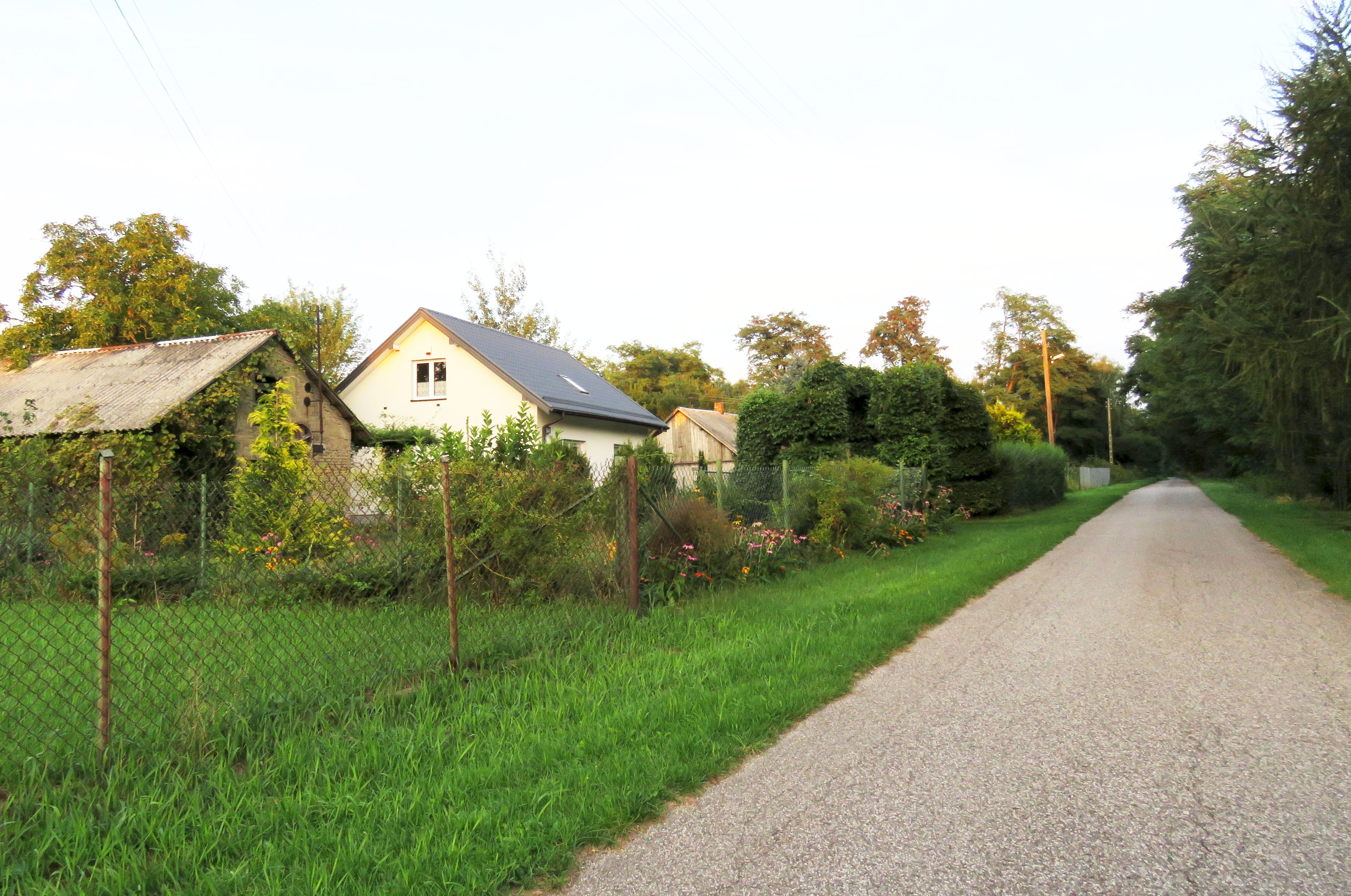

- Location within Poland
- Coordinates: 51°56′47″N 20°21′18″E
- Country: Poland
- Voivodeship: Masovian
- County: Żyrardów
- Gmina: Puszcza Mariańska

Nowy Łajszczew [ˈnɔvɨ ˈwai̯ʂt͡ʂɛf] is a village in the administrative district of Gmina Puszcza Mariańska, within Żyrardów County, Masovian Voivodeship, in east-central Poland.
