= Stary Łajszczew =

- Village
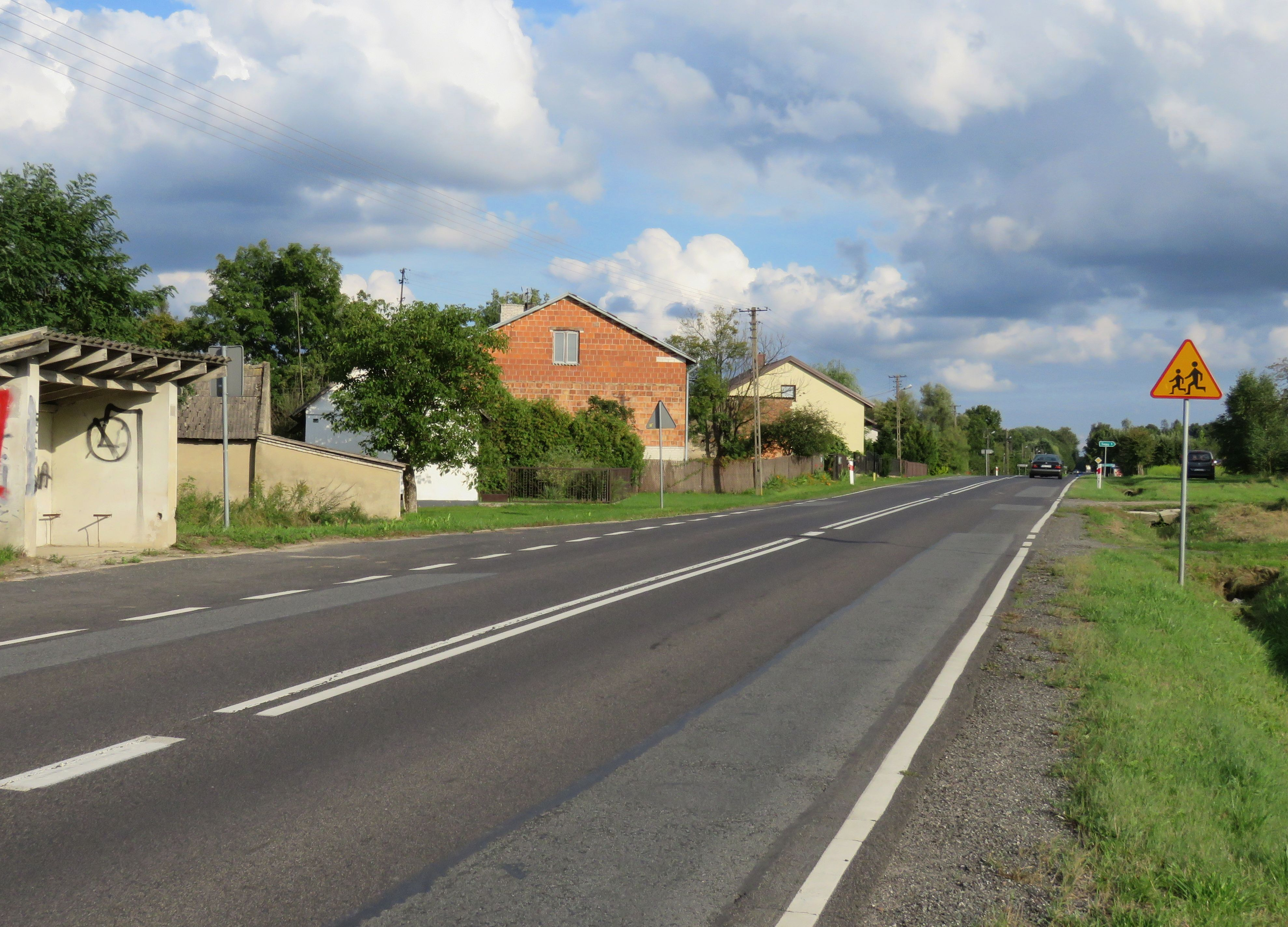

- Location within Poland
- Coordinates: 51°56′03″N 20°20′50″E
- Country: Poland
- Voivodeship: Masovian
- County: Żyrardów
- Gmina: Puszcza Mariańska

Stary Łajszczew [ˈstarɨ ˈwai̯ʂt͡ʂɛf] is a village in the administrative district of Gmina Puszcza Mariańska, within Żyrardów County, Masovian Voivodeship, in east-central Poland.
