= Líšná (Přerov District) =

- Municipality
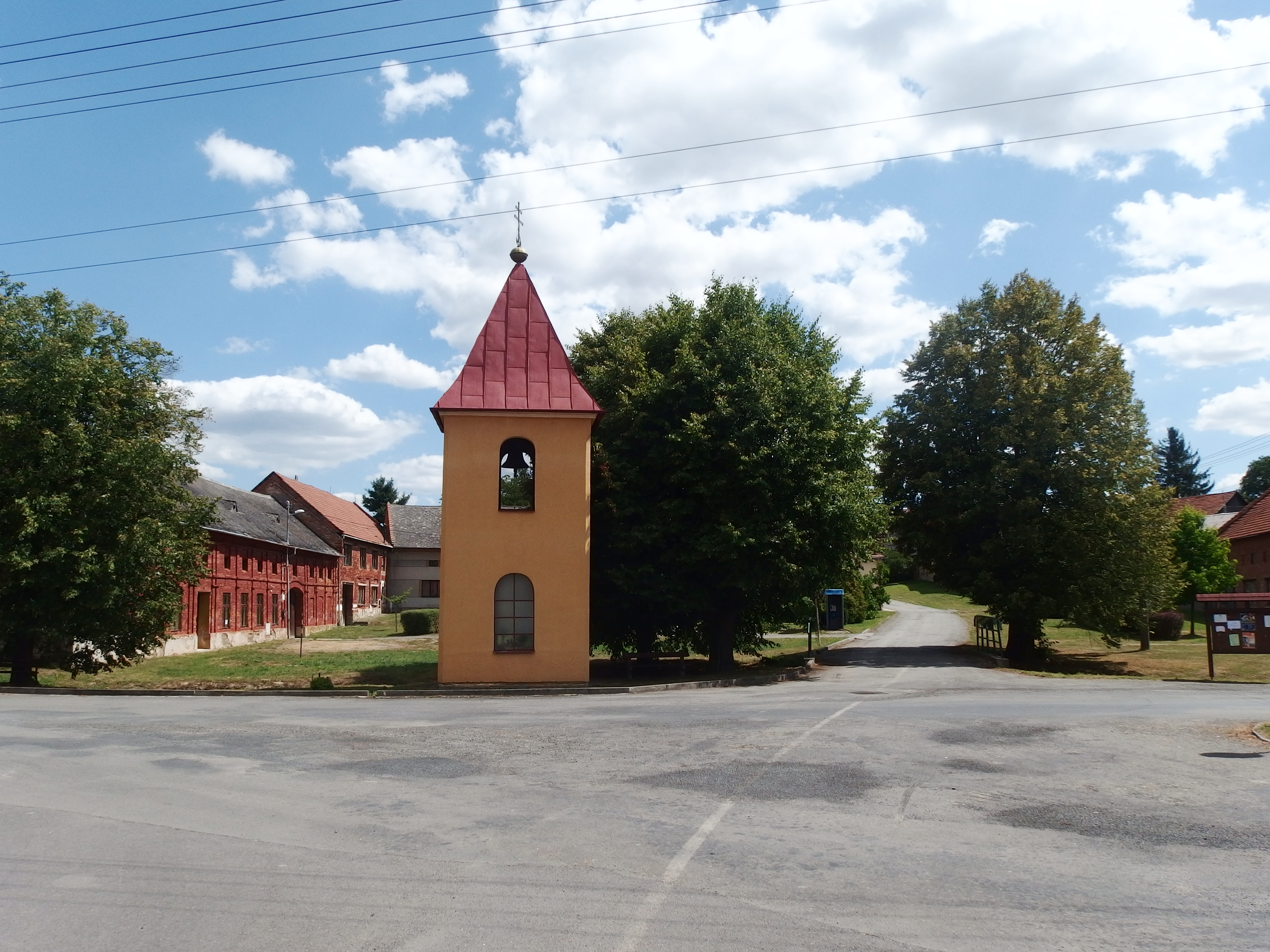
- Centre of Líšná

- Flag Coat of arms

- Location in the Czech Republic
- Coordinates: 49°24′42″N 17°32′51″E
- Country: Czech Republic
- Region: Olomouc
- District: Přerov
- First mentioned: 1368

Area
  - Total: 3.74 km^{2} (1.44 sq mi)
- Elevation: 237 m (778 ft)

Population (2026-01-01)
  - Total: 262
  - Density: 70.1/km^{2} (181/sq mi)
- Time zone: UTC+1 (CET)
  - Summer (DST): UTC+2 (CEST)
- Postal code: 751 15
- Website: www.obeclisna.cz

Líšná is a municipality and village in Přerov District in the Olomouc Region of the Czech Republic. It has about 300 inhabitants.

== Etymology ==
The name is probably derived from líska, i.e. 'hazel'. According to another theory, it is derived from les, i.e. 'forest'.

== Geography ==
Líšná is located about 8 kilometres (5 mi) southeast of Přerov and 28 km (17 mi) southeast of Olomouc. It lies in the Moravian-Silesian Foothills. The highest point is at 314 m (1,030 ft) above sea level.

== History ==
The first written mention of Líšná is from 1368. The village was probably founded around 1360.

== Demographics ==
Historical population

Year	Pop.	±%
1869	347	—
1880	354	+2.0%
1890	341	−3.7%
1900	400	+17.3%
1910	438	+9.5%

Year	Pop.	±%
1921	428	−2.3%
1930	440	+2.8%
1950	395	−10.2%
1961	392	−0.8%
1970	335	−14.5%

Year	Pop.	±%
1980	281	−16.1%
1991	232	−17.4%
2001	219	−5.6%
2011	245	+11.9%
2021	244	−0.4%

Source: Censuses

== Transport ==
There are no railways or major roads passing through the municipality.

== Sights ==
There are no protected cultural monuments in the municipality. A landmark in the centre of Líšná is a small belfry.
