= Mrozy, Żyrardów County =

Mrozy
- Village
- Location within Poland
- Coordinates: 52°1′N 20°22′E
- Country: Poland
- Voivodeship: Masovian
- County: Żyrardów
- Gmina: Puszcza Mariańska
- Population: 1,789

Mrozy [ˈmrɔzɨ] is a village in the administrative district of Gmina Puszcza Mariańska, within Żyrardów County, Masovian Voivodeship, in east-central Poland.
