= Sewerynów, Skierniewice County =

Sewerynów
- Village
- Location within Poland
- Coordinates: 51°54′58″N 20°17′51″E
- Country: Poland
- Voivodeship: Łódź
- County: Skierniewice
- Gmina: Nowy Kawęczyn

Sewerynów [sɛvɛˈrɨnuf] is a village in the administrative district of Gmina Nowy Kawęczyn, within Skierniewice County, Łódź Voivodeship, in central Poland.
