= Paplin, Łódź Voivodeship =

Paplin
- Village
- Location within Poland
- Coordinates: 51°53′51″N 20°22′35″E
- Country: Poland
- Voivodeship: Łódź
- County: Skierniewice
- Gmina: Kowiesy

Paplin [ˈpaplin] is a village in the administrative district of Gmina Kowiesy, within Skierniewice County, Łódź Voivodeship, in central Poland.
