= Líšná (Žďár nad Sázavou District) =

- Municipality
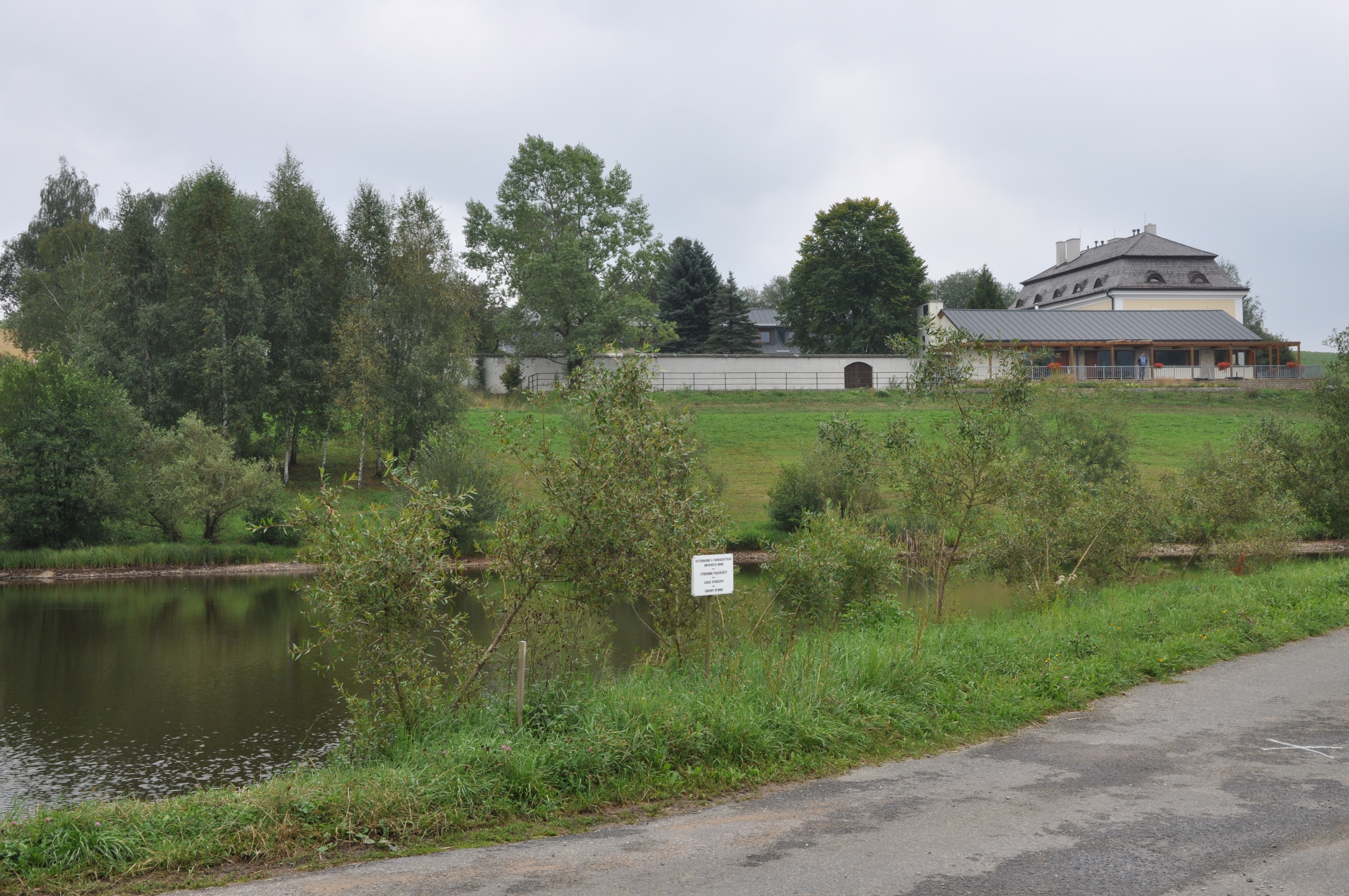
- Líšenský Dvůr, a locality in Líšná

- Location in the Czech Republic
- Coordinates: 49°38′25″N 16°9′4″E
- Country: Czech Republic
- Region: Vysočina
- District: Žďár nad Sázavou
- First mentioned: 1500

Area
  - Total: 5.74 km^{2} (2.22 sq mi)
- Elevation: 615 m (2,018 ft)

Population (2026-01-01)
  - Total: 51
  - Density: 8.9/km^{2} (23/sq mi)
- Time zone: UTC+1 (CET)
  - Summer (DST): UTC+2 (CEST)
- Postal code: 592 03
- Website: www.obec-lisna.cz

Líšná is a municipality and village in Žďár nad Sázavou District in the Vysočina Region of the Czech Republic. It has about 50 inhabitants.

Líšná lies approximately 17 kilometres (11 mi) north-east of Žďár nad Sázavou, 49 km (30 mi) north-east of Jihlava, and 134 km (83 mi) east of Prague.

== Demographics ==
Historical population
| Year | Pop. | ±% |
|---|---|---|
| 1869 | 340 | — |
| 1880 | 347 | +2.1% |
| 1890 | 296 | −14.7% |
| 1900 | 310 | +4.7% |
| 1910 | 337 | +8.7% |
| 1921 | 288 | −14.5% |
| 1930 | 277 | −3.8% |
| 1950 | 161 | −41.9% |
| 1961 | 153 | −5.0% |
| 1970 | 140 | −8.5% |
| 1980 | 119 | −15.0% |
| 1991 | 75 | −37.0% |
| 2001 | 56 | −25.3% |
| 2011 | 56 | +0.0% |
| 2021 | 55 | −1.8% |
Source: Censuses
