= Klamry coat of arms =

Polish coat of arms

Klamry
- Earliest mention: unknown
- Families: Baratyński, Bielikowicz, Boratyński, Bour, Buchowiecki, Hołyński, Hubarewicz, Jurhiewicz, Klamra, Klawsewicz, Kleczkowski, Kławsewicz, Koziutycz, Krupecki, Myszyński, Narusz, Nekraś, Niekrasz, Niekraszewicz, Niekraś, Niemierzyc, Niemira, Niemirowicz, Niemiryc, Niemirycz, Niemirzyc, Rabsztyński, Rapsztyński, Siennicki, Silicz, Sinicki, Tarkowski, Terlecki, Tupalski, Worona, Woronowicz, Wyśkiwec, Wyśkiwiec, Wytyz, Wytyzcz

Klamry (Polish for "clamps") is a Polish coat of arms.

== See also ==
- Polish heraldry
- Heraldic family
- List of Polish nobility coats of arms

== Bibliography ==
- Tadeusz Gajl: Herbarz polski od średniowiecza do XX wieku : ponad 4500 herbów szlacheckich 37 tysięcy nazwisk 55 tysięcy rodów. L&L, 2007, s. 406–539. ISBN 978-83-60597-10-1.
