= Budy Zaklasztorne =

- Village
- Location within Poland
- Coordinates: 52°0′N 20°19′E
- Country: Poland
- Voivodeship: Masovian
- County: Żyrardów
- Gmina: Puszcza Mariańska
- Population: 440

Budy Zaklasztorne [ˈbudɨ zaklaʂˈtɔrnɛ] is a village in the administrative district of Gmina Puszcza Mariańska, within Żyrardów County, Masovian Voivodeship, in east-central Poland.
