= Ulaski, Łódź Voivodeship =

Ulaski
- Village
- Location within Poland
- Coordinates: 51°54′18″N 20°28′40″E
- Country: Poland
- Voivodeship: Łódź
- County: Skierniewice
- Gmina: Kowiesy

Ulaski [uˈlaski] is a village in the administrative district of Gmina Kowiesy, within Skierniewice County, Łódź Voivodeship, in central Poland.
