= Stary Karolinów =

- Village
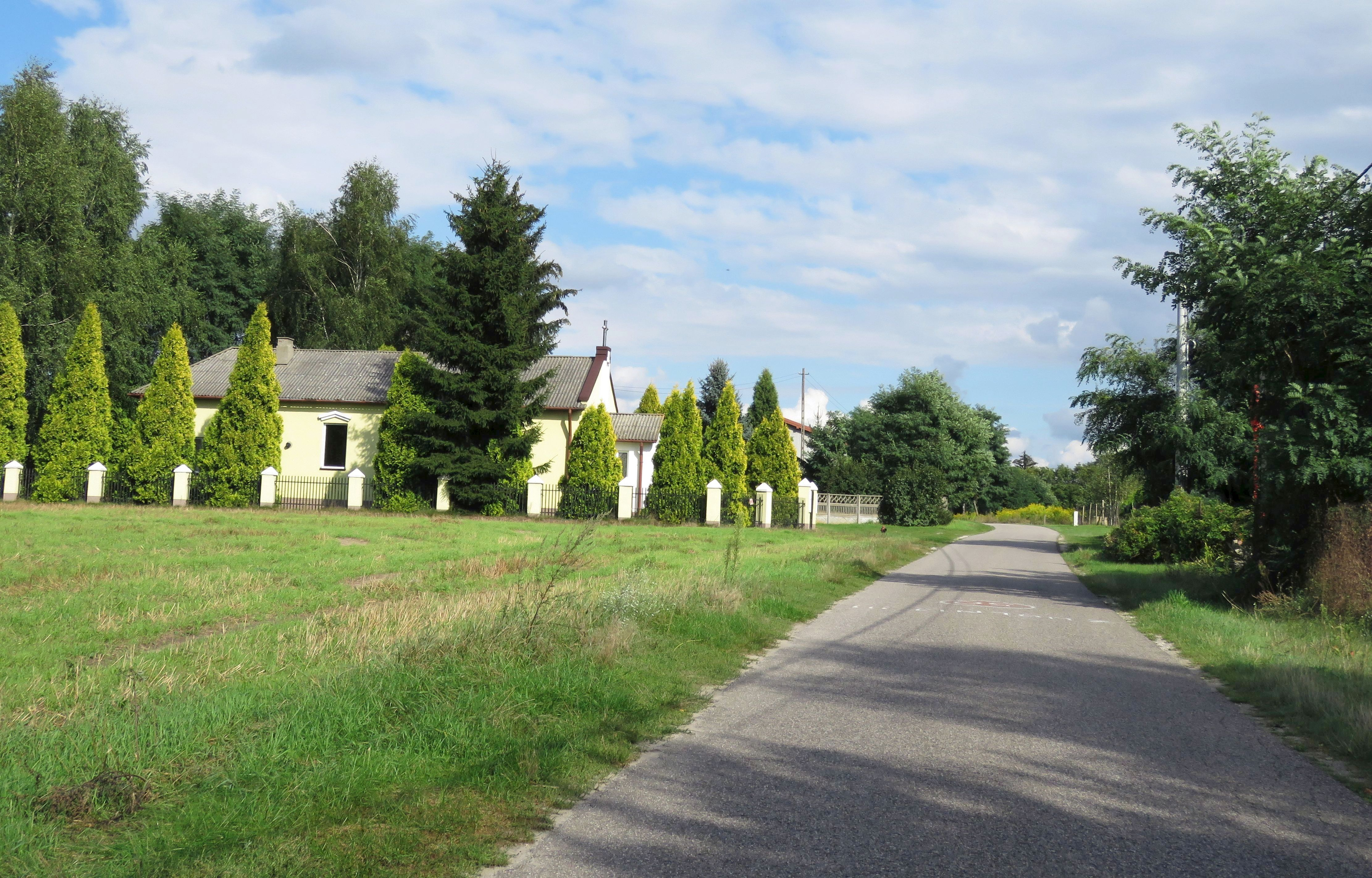

- Location within Poland
- Coordinates: 51°57′42″N 20°17′32″E
- Country: Poland
- Voivodeship: Masovian
- County: Żyrardów
- Gmina: Puszcza Mariańska

Stary Karolinów [ˈstarɨ karɔˈlinuf] is a village in the administrative district of Gmina Puszcza Mariańska, within Żyrardów County, Masovian Voivodeship, in east-central Poland.
