= Chełmce, Łódź Voivodeship =

Chełmce
- Village
- Location within Poland
- Coordinates: 51°53′38″N 20°21′31″E
- Country: Poland
- Voivodeship: Łódź
- County: Skierniewice
- Gmina: Kowiesy

Chełmce [ˈxɛu̯mt͡sɛ] is a village in the administrative district of Gmina Kowiesy, within Skierniewice County, Łódź Voivodeship, in central Poland.
