= Wycześniak =

- Village
- Location within Poland
- Coordinates: 51°56′N 20°19′E
- Country: Poland
- Voivodeship: Masovian
- County: Żyrardów
- Gmina: Puszcza Mariańska

Wycześniak [vɨˈt͡ʂɛɕɲak] is a village in the administrative district of Gmina Puszcza Mariańska, within Żyrardów County, Masovian Voivodeship, in east-central Poland.
