= Esterka, Łódź Voivodeship =

Esterka
- Village
- Location within Poland
- Coordinates: 51°53′18″N 20°19′48″E
- Country: Poland
- Voivodeship: Łódź
- County: Skierniewice
- Gmina: Nowy Kawęczyn

Esterka [ɛsˈtɛrka] is a village in the administrative district of Gmina Nowy Kawęczyn, within Skierniewice County, Łódź Voivodeship, in central Poland.
