= Lisna, Poland =

Lisna
- Village
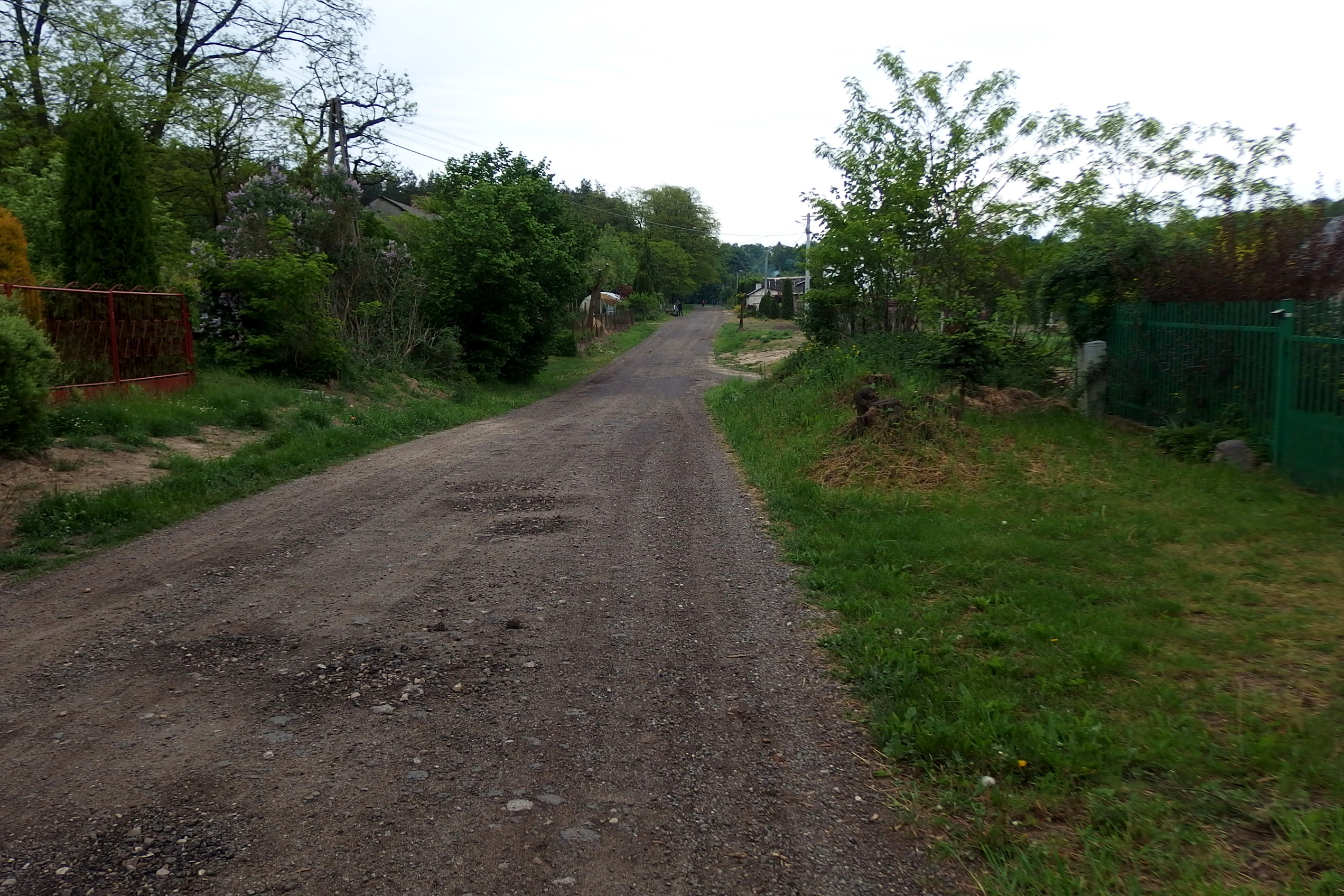

- Location within Poland
- Coordinates: 51°52′36″N 20°20′13″E
- Country: Poland
- Voivodeship: Łódź
- County: Skierniewice
- Gmina: Kowiesy
- Population (approx.): 130

Lisna [ˈlisna] is a village in the administrative district of Gmina Kowiesy, within Skierniewice County, Łódź Voivodeship, in central Poland.

The village has an approximate population of 130.
