= Gaba =

Gaba (with or without diacritics) or GABA may refer to:

== Biology and medicine ==
- γ-Aminobutyric acid or GABA, the main inhibitory neurotransmitter in the central nervous system
  - GABA receptor, a proteinaceous signalling molecule
- Gabapentin, an anticonvulsant medication
- GABA International, an oral care company owned by Colgate-Palmolive

== Places, food, and drink ==
=== Middle East ===
- Jaba', Haifa, a village near Mount Carmel, Israel also known as Gaba
- Jab'a, a village in the West Bank, southwest of Jerusalem, also known as Gaba
- Gaba, ancient city in what is now Tel Shush
- Gaba, a Persian city located in what is now known as Isfahan

=== Elsewhere ===
- Gąba, a village in Poland
- Gaba, a suburb of Makindye, Kampala, Uganda, on the shores of Lake Victoria
- Gaba railway station, on the Chinese Qingzang Railway
- Gaba (restaurant), in Mexico City
- GABA tea, commonly used name for tea passed through anoxic fermentation

== People ==
=== Surname ===
- Harold Gaba (1946–2009), American businessman
- Lester Gaba (1907–1987), American sculptor, writer and retail display designer
- Marianne Gaba (1939–2016), American model
- Milan Gába (fl. 1970s–1980s), Czechoslovak slalom canoeist
- Millind Gaba (born 1990), Indian musician and celebrity
- Mo Gaba (2006–2020), American sports superfan and radio personality
- Pierre Toura Gaba (1920–1998), Chadian politician and diplomat

=== Given name ===
- Gaba Kulka (born 1979), Polish artist

== Other uses ==
- Gabâ or gabaa (Philippines), the concept of negative karma among the Cebuano people
- Gába, a Sami magazine of Norway
- Gaba Corporation, an English conversation school in Japan

== See also ==
- Gabba (disambiguation)
- Gabaa (disambiguation)
