= Olszówka, Masovian Voivodeship =

Olszówka
- Village
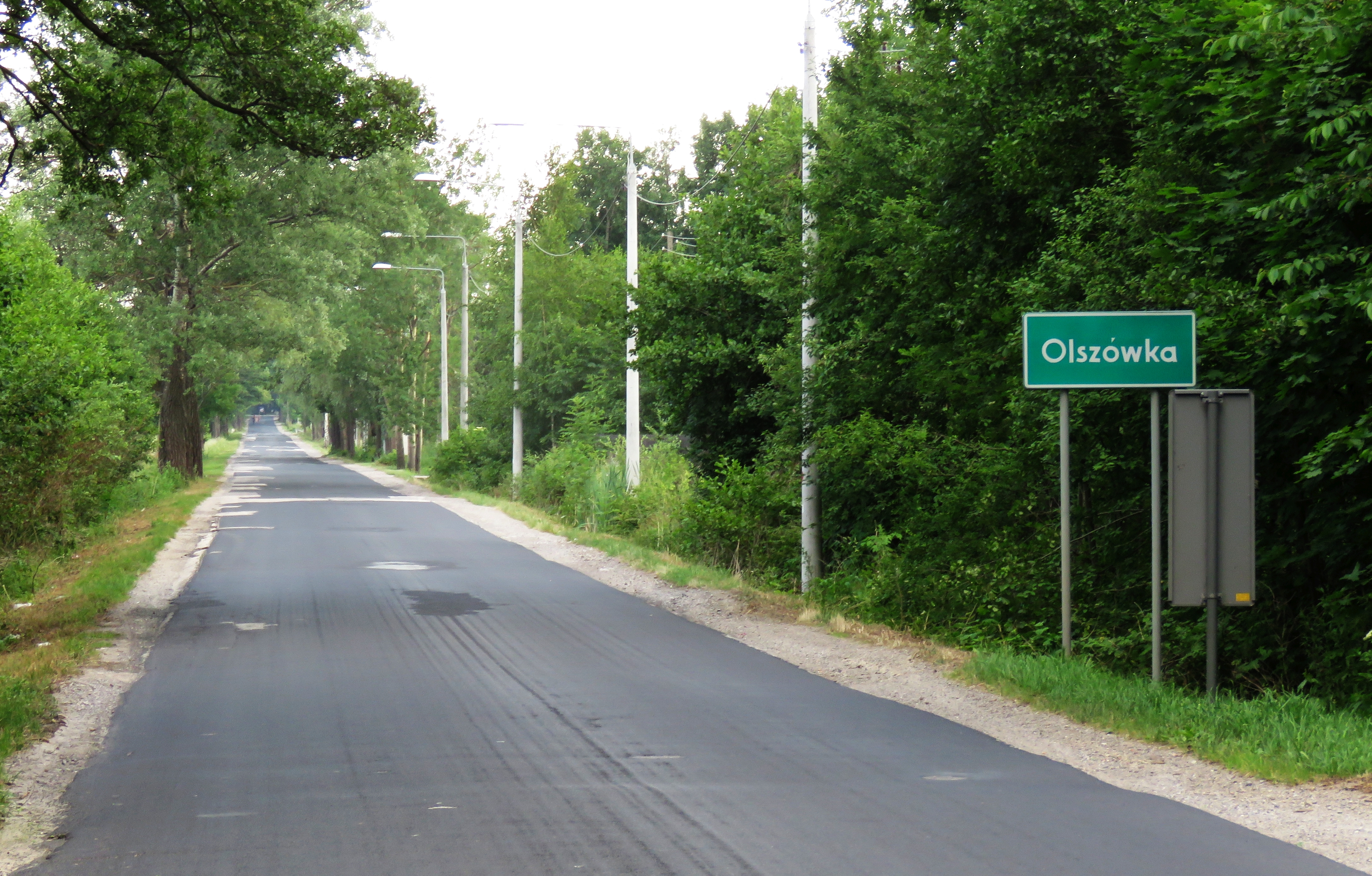
- Road sign in Olszówka

- Location within Poland
- Coordinates: 52°00′22″N 20°26′26″E
- Country: Poland
- Voivodeship: Masovian
- County: Żyrardów
- Gmina: Mszczonów

Olszówka [ɔlˈʂufka] is a village in the administrative district of Gmina Mszczonów, within Żyrardów County, Masovian Voivodeship, in east-central Poland.
