= Grabce Wręckie =

Village in Gmina Mszczonów, Poland

- Village
- Location within Poland
- Coordinates: 51°58′21″N 20°26′55″E
- Country: Poland
- Voivodeship: Masovian
- County: Żyrardów
- Gmina: Mszczonów

Grabce Wręckie [ˈɡrapt͡sɛ ˈvrɛnt͡skʲɛ] is a village in the administrative district of Gmina Mszczonów, within Żyrardów County, Masovian Voivodeship, in east-central Poland.
