= Długowizna =

Village in Gmina Mszczonów, Poland

- Village
- Location within Poland
- Coordinates: 51°58′45″N 20°27′42″E
- Country: Poland
- Voivodeship: Masovian
- County: Żyrardów
- Gmina: Mszczonów

Długowizna [dwuɡɔˈvizna] is a village in the administrative district of Gmina Mszczonów, within Żyrardów County, Masovian Voivodeship, in east-central Poland.
