= Nosy-Poniatki =

- Village
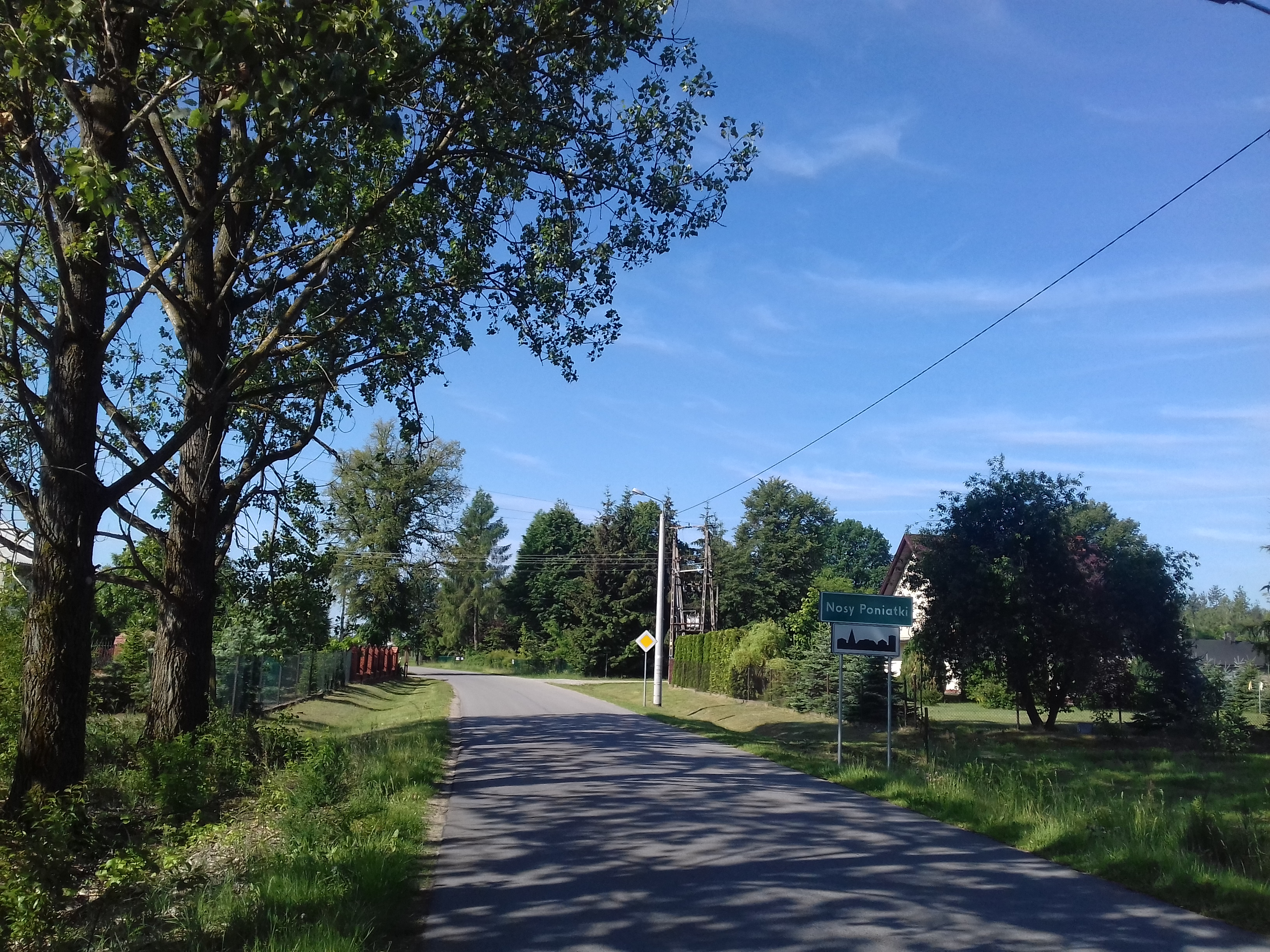

- Location within Poland
- Coordinates: 51°55′2″N 20°39′22″E
- Country: Poland
- Voivodeship: Masovian
- County: Żyrardów
- Gmina: Mszczonów
- Elevation: 191 m (627 ft)

Population
  - Total: 150
- Time zone: UTC+1 (CET)
  - Summer (DST): UTC+2 (CEST)

Nosy-Poniatki [ˈnɔsɨ pɔˈɲatki] is a village in the administrative district of Gmina Mszczonów, within Żyrardów County, Masovian Voivodeship, in east-central Poland.

Nine Polish citizens were murdered by Nazi Germany in the village during World War II.
