= Michalin, Żyrardów County =

Michalin
- Village
- Location within Poland
- Coordinates: 51°55′26″N 20°30′04″E
- Country: Poland
- Voivodeship: Masovian
- County: Żyrardów
- Gmina: Mszczonów

Michalin [miˈxalin] is a village in the administrative district of Gmina Mszczonów, within Żyrardów County, Masovian Voivodeship, in east-central Poland.
