= Strzyże =

Strzyże may refer to the following places:

- Strzyże, Pułtusk County in Masovian Voivodeship (east-central Poland)
- Strzyże, Żyrardów County in Masovian Voivodeship (east-central Poland)
- Strzyże, Warmian-Masurian Voivodeship (north Poland)
