= Pieńki Osuchowskie =

- Village
- Location within Poland
- Coordinates: 51°55′09″N 20°34′39″E
- Country: Poland
- Voivodeship: Masovian
- County: Żyrardów
- Gmina: Mszczonów

Pieńki Osuchowskie [ˈpjɛɲki ɔsuˈxɔfskʲɛ] is a village in the administrative district of Gmina Mszczonów, within Żyrardów County, Masovian Voivodeship, in east-central Poland.
