= Lindów, Masovian Voivodeship =

Lindów
- Village
- Location within Poland
- Coordinates: 51°53′57″N 20°29′59″E
- Country: Poland
- Voivodeship: Masovian
- County: Żyrardów
- Gmina: Mszczonów
- Elevation: 196 m (643 ft)
- Population: 120

Lindów [ˈlinduf] is a village in the administrative district of Gmina Mszczonów, within Żyrardów County, Masovian Voivodeship, in east-central Poland.
