= Badowo-Mściska =

- Village
- Location within Poland
- Coordinates: 51°57′47″N 20°33′11″E
- Country: Poland
- Voivodeship: Masovian
- County: Żyrardów
- Gmina: Mszczonów
- Elevation: 177 m (581 ft)
- Population (2017): 102

Badowo-Mściska [baˈdɔvɔ ˈmɕt͡ɕiska] is a village in the administrative district of Gmina Mszczonów, within Żyrardów County, Masovian Voivodeship, in east-central Poland.
