= Pogorzałki, Masovian Voivodeship =

Pogorzałki
- Village
- Location within Poland
- Coordinates: 51°58′25″N 20°33′44″E
- Country: Poland
- Voivodeship: Masovian
- County: Żyrardów
- Gmina: Mszczonów

Pogorzałki [pɔɡɔˈʐau̯ki] is a village in the administrative district of Gmina Mszczonów, within Żyrardów County, Masovian Voivodeship, in east-central Poland.
