= Pawłowice, Żyrardów County =

Pawłowice
- Village
- Location within Poland
- Coordinates: 51°51′12″N 20°37′7″E
- Country: Poland
- Voivodeship: Masovian
- County: Żyrardów
- Gmina: Mszczonów

Pawłowice [pavwɔˈvit͡sɛ] is a village in the administrative district of Gmina Mszczonów, within Żyrardów County, Masovian Voivodeship, in east-central Poland.
