= Bobrowce =

- Village
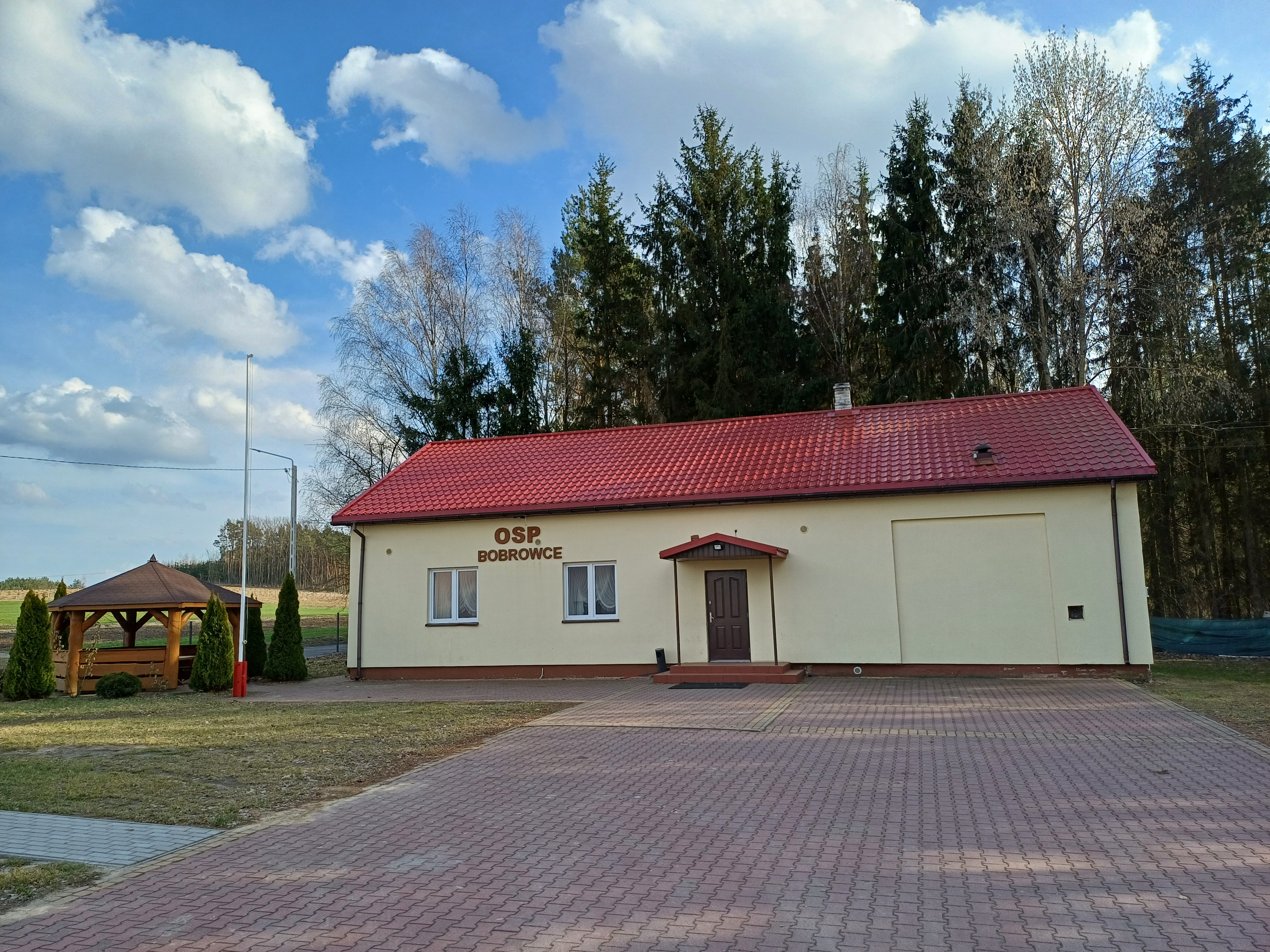
- Volunteer fire department

- Location within Poland
- Coordinates: 51°52′4″N 20°36′32″E
- Country: Poland
- Voivodeship: Masovian
- County: Żyrardów
- Gmina: Mszczonów
- Elevation: 180 m (590 ft)

Population
  - Total: 300
- Time zone: UTC+1 (CET)
  - Summer (DST): UTC+2 (CEST)

Bobrowce [bɔˈbrɔft͡sɛ] is a village in the administrative district of Gmina Mszczonów, within Żyrardów County, Masovian Voivodeship, in east-central Poland.

Five Polish citizens were murdered by Nazi Germany in the village during World War II.
