= Piekary, Masovian Voivodeship =

Piekary
- Village
- Location within Poland
- Coordinates: 51°55′54″N 20°32′3″E
- Country: Poland
- Voivodeship: Masovian
- County: Żyrardów
- Gmina: Mszczonów
- Elevation: 200 m (660 ft)
- Population: 130

Piekary [pjɛˈkarɨ] is a village in the administrative district of Gmina Mszczonów, within Żyrardów County, Masovian Voivodeship, in east-central Poland.
