= Adamowice, Masovian Voivodeship =

Adamowice
- Village
- Location within Poland
- Coordinates: 51°56′25″N 20°28′25″E
- Country: Poland
- Voivodeship: Masovian
- County: Żyrardów
- Gmina: Mszczonów

Adamowice [adamɔˈvit͡sɛ] is a village in the administrative district of Gmina Mszczonów, within Żyrardów County, Masovian Voivodeship, in east-central Poland.
