= Wólka Wręcka =

- Village
- Location within Poland
- Coordinates: 51°58′48″N 20°25′58″E
- Country: Poland
- Voivodeship: Masovian
- County: Żyrardów
- Gmina: Mszczonów

Wólka Wręcka [ˈvulka ˈvrɛnt͡ska] is a village in the administrative district of Gmina Mszczonów, within Żyrardów County, Masovian Voivodeship, in east-central Poland.
