= Bronisławka =

Bronisławka may refer to the following places:

- Bronisławka, Puławy County in Lublin Voivodeship (east Poland)
- Bronisławka, Zamość County in Lublin Voivodeship (east Poland)
- Bronisławka, Gmina Pomiechówek, Nowy Dwór County in Masovian Voivodeship (east-central Poland)
- Bronisławka, Żyrardów County in Masovian Voivodeship
- Bronisławka, Greater Poland Voivodeship (west-central Poland)
