= Budy-Zasłona =

Village in Gmina Mszczonów, Poland

- Village
- Location within Poland
- Coordinates: 51°55′8″N 20°29′16″E
- Country: Poland
- Voivodeship: Masovian
- County: Żyrardów
- Gmina: Mszczonów

Budy-Zasłona [ˈbudɨ zaˈswɔna] is a village in the administrative district of Gmina Mszczonów, within Żyrardów County, Masovian Voivodeship, in east-central Poland.
