= Bronisławów, Żyrardów County =

Bronisławów
- Village
- Location within Poland
- Coordinates: 51°56′57″N 20°33′49″E
- Country: Poland
- Voivodeship: Masovian
- County: Żyrardów
- Gmina: Mszczonów

Bronisławów [brɔɲiˈswavuf] is a village in the administrative district of Gmina Mszczonów, within Żyrardów County, Masovian Voivodeship, in east-central Poland.
