= Władysławów, Żyrardów County =

Władysławów
- Village
- Location within Poland
- Coordinates: 51°56′32″N 20°34′12″E
- Country: Poland
- Voivodeship: Masovian
- County: Żyrardów
- Gmina: Mszczonów

Władysławów [vwadɨˈswavuf] is a village in the administrative district of Gmina Mszczonów, within Żyrardów County, Masovian Voivodeship, in east-central Poland.
