= Nowy Dworek, Masovian Voivodeship =

Nowy Dworek
- Village
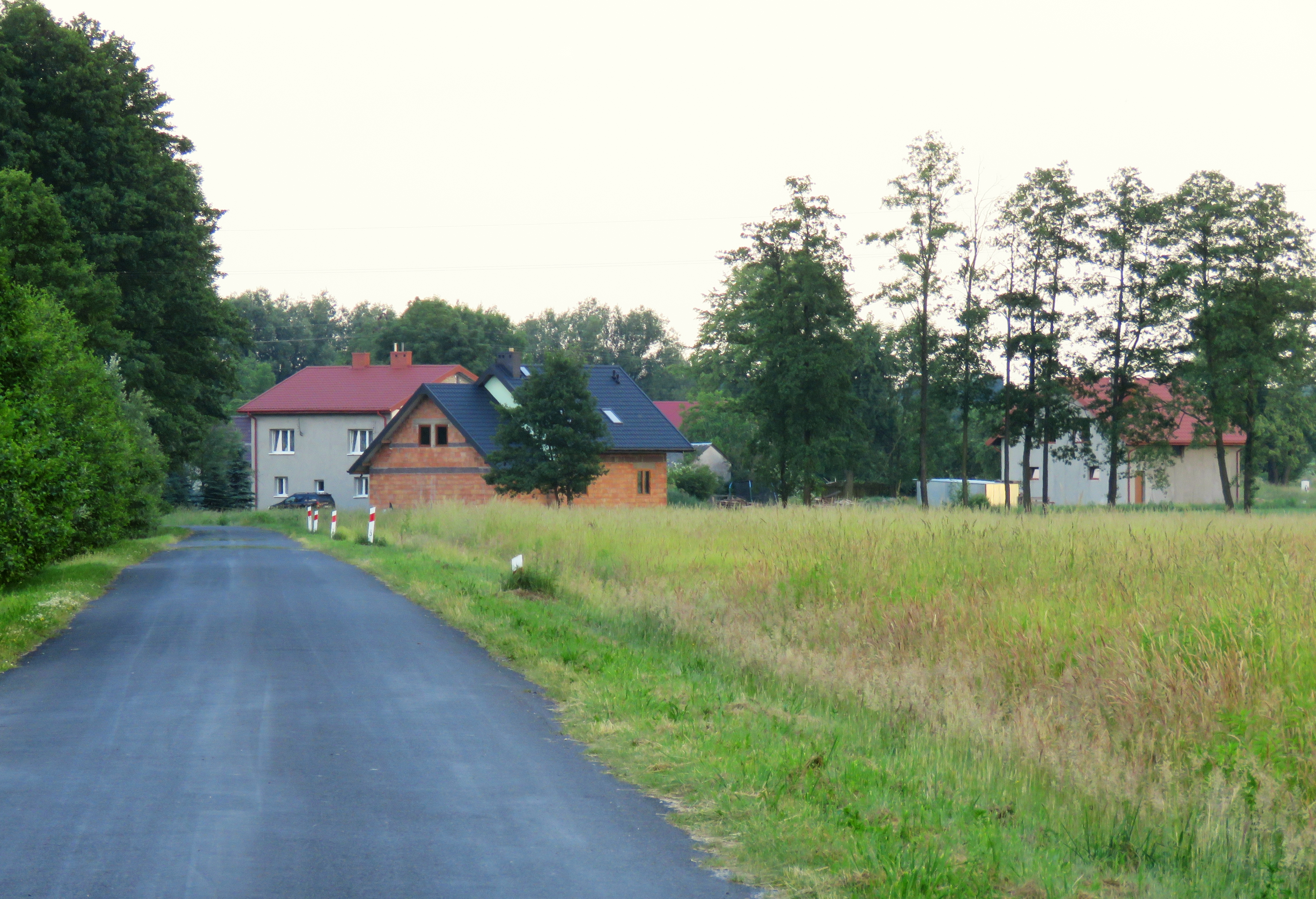
- Roadside houses in Nowy Dworek

- Location within Poland
- Coordinates: 52°01′03″N 20°26′13″E
- Country: Poland
- Voivodeship: Masovian
- County: Żyrardów
- Gmina: Mszczonów

Nowy Dworek [ˈnɔvɨ ˈdvɔrɛk] is a village in the administrative district of Gmina Mszczonów, within Żyrardów County, Masovian Voivodeship, in east-central Poland.
