= Pieńki-Strzyże =

- Village
- Location within Poland
- Coordinates: 51°56′13″N 20°34′47″E
- Country: Poland
- Voivodeship: Masovian
- County: Żyrardów
- Gmina: Mszczonów

Pieńki-Strzyże [ˈpjɛɲki ˈstʂɨʐɛ] is a village in the administrative district of Gmina Mszczonów, within Żyrardów County, Masovian Voivodeship, in east-central Poland.
