= Wygnanka, Masovian Voivodeship =

Wygnanka
- Village
- Location within Poland
- Coordinates: 51°53′35″N 20°38′1″E
- Country: Poland
- Voivodeship: Masovian
- County: Żyrardów
- Gmina: Mszczonów
- Elevation: 171 m (561 ft)
- Population: 230

Wygnanka [vɨɡˈnaŋka] is a village in the administrative district of Gmina Mszczonów, within Żyrardów County, Masovian Voivodeship, in east-central Poland.
