= Nowe Poręby =

- Village
- Location within Poland
- Coordinates: 51°51′46″N 20°38′26″E
- Country: Poland
- Voivodeship: Masovian
- County: Żyrardów
- Gmina: Mszczonów

Nowe Poręby [ˈnɔvɛ pɔˈrɛmbɨ] is a village in the administrative district of Gmina Mszczonów, within Żyrardów County, Masovian Voivodeship, in east-central Poland.
