= Osuchów-Kolonia, Żyrardów County =

Osuchów-Kolonia
- Village
- Location within Poland
- Coordinates: 51°54′12″N 20°35′51″E
- Country: Poland
- Voivodeship: Masovian
- County: Żyrardów
- Gmina: Mszczonów
- Elevation: 188 m (617 ft)
- Population: 20

Osuchów-Kolonia [ɔˈsuxuf kɔˈlɔɲa] is a village in the administrative district of Gmina Mszczonów, within Żyrardów County, Masovian Voivodeship, in east central Poland.
