= Kowiesowo =

- Village
- Location within Poland
- Coordinates: 51°54′N 20°32′E
- Country: Poland
- Voivodeship: Masovian
- County: Żyrardów
- Gmina: Mszczonów

Kowiesowo [kɔvjɛˈsɔvɔ] is a village in the administrative district of Gmina Mszczonów, within Żyrardów County, Masovian Voivodeship, in east-central Poland.
