= Kamionka, Gmina Mszczonów =

Kamionka
- Village
- Location within Poland
- Coordinates: 51°57′02″N 20°31′28″E
- Country: Poland
- Voivodeship: Masovian
- County: Żyrardów
- Gmina: Mszczonów

Kamionka [kaˈmjɔnka] is a village in the administrative district of Gmina Mszczonów, within Żyrardów County, Masovian Voivodeship, in east-central Poland.
