= Wymysłów, Żyrardów County =

Village in Mazovia

Wymysłów
- Village
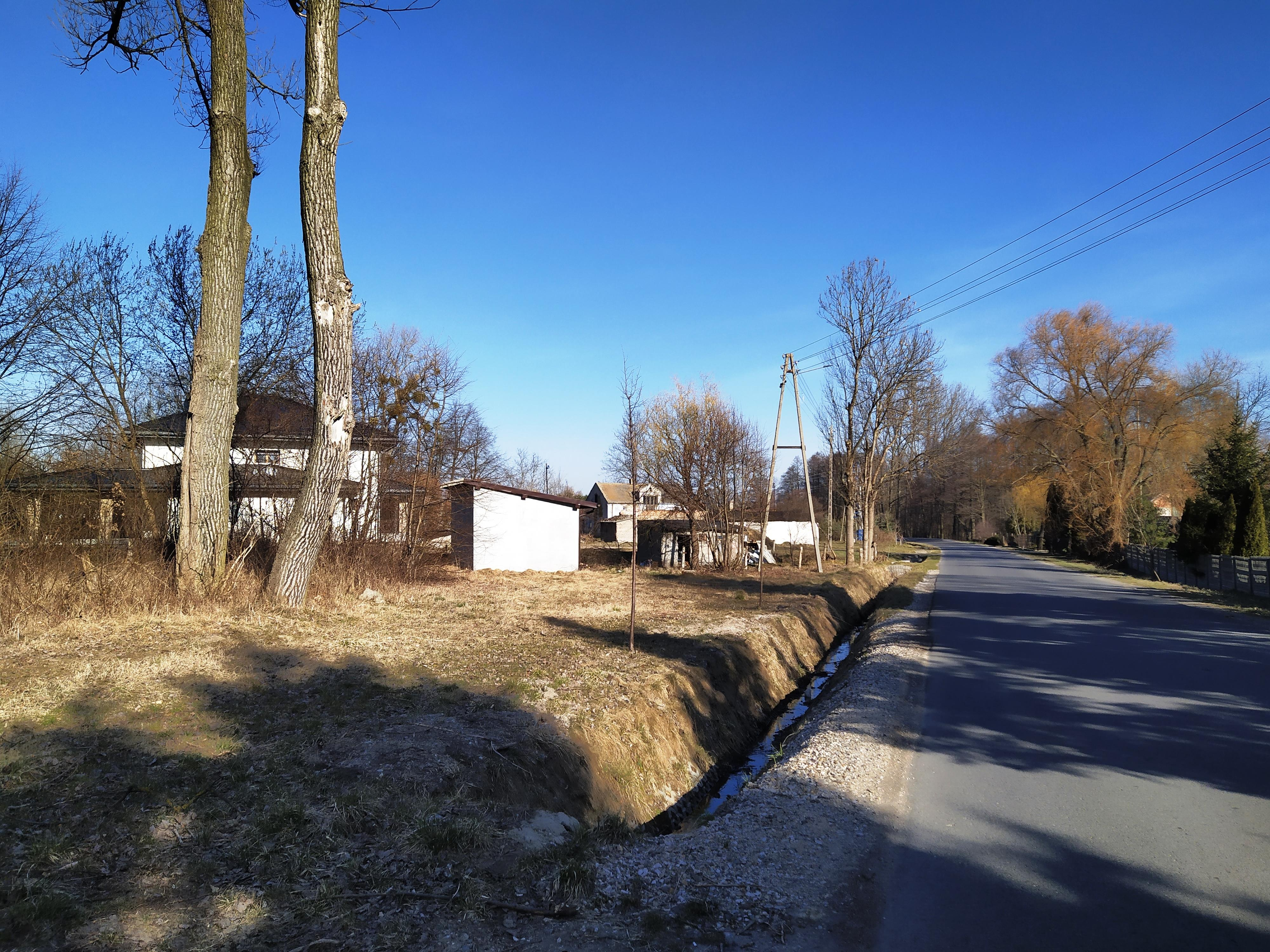

- Location within Poland
- Coordinates: 51°57′32″N 20°30′51″E
- Country: Poland
- Voivodeship: Masovian
- County: Żyrardów
- Gmina: Mszczonów

Wymysłów [vɨˈmɨswuf] is a village in the administrative district of Gmina Mszczonów, within Żyrardów County, Masovian Voivodeship, in east-central Poland.
