= Kowiesy =

Kowiesy may refer to the following places:

- Kowiesy, Łódź Voivodeship (central Poland)
- Kowiesy, Sokołów County in Masovian Voivodeship (east-central Poland)
- Kowiesy, Żyrardów County in Masovian Voivodeship (east-central Poland)
