= Sosnowica =

Sosnowica may refer to the following villages in Poland:

- Sosnowica, Lublin Voivodeship (east Poland)
- Sosnowica, Masovian Voivodeship (east-central Poland)

== See also ==
- Sosnowica-Dwór
