= Janówek, Gmina Mszczonów =

Janówek
- Village
- Location within Poland
- Coordinates: 51°51′17″N 20°38′14″E
- Country: Poland
- Voivodeship: Masovian
- County: Żyrardów
- Gmina: Mszczonów

Janówek [jaˈnuvɛk] is a village in the administrative district of Gmina Mszczonów, within Żyrardów County, Masovian Voivodeship, in east-central Poland.
