= Ciemno-Gnojna =

- Village
- Location within Poland
- Coordinates: 51°58′05″N 20°34′09″E
- Country: Poland
- Voivodeship: Masovian
- County: Żyrardów
- Gmina: Mszczonów

Ciemno-Gnojna [ˈt͡ɕɛmnɔ ˈɡnɔi̯na] is a village in the administrative district of Gmina Mszczonów, within Żyrardów County, Masovian Voivodeship, in east-central Poland.
