= Powązki (disambiguation) =

- Powązki Cemetery is a major cemetery in Warsaw
- Powązki Military Cemetery is a major military cemetery in Warsaw

Powązki may also refer to the following villages:

- Powązki, Warsaw West County
- Powązki, Żyrardów County
