= Gabaa =

Gabaa may refer to:

- Gabâ, the concept of divine retribution in parts of the Philippines

GABAA may refer to:

- GABA_{A} receptor

== See also ==
- Gaaba, an Indian dish prepared from taro leaves
- Gaba (disambiguation)
- Gabba (disambiguation)
