= Budy-Strzyże =

- Village
- Location within Poland
- Coordinates: 51°55′47″N 20°33′21″E
- Country: Poland
- Voivodeship: Masovian
- County: Żyrardów
- Gmina: Mszczonów
- Elevation: 202 m (663 ft)

Budy-Strzyże [ˈbudɨ ˈstʂɨʐɛ] is a village in the administrative district of Gmina Mszczonów, within Żyrardów County, Masovian Voivodeship, in east-central Poland.
