= Gabba =

Gabba may refer to:

== Music ==
- Gabber, a subgenre of hardcore techno also known as "gabba"
- Gabba (band), a tribute band covering the pop songs of ABBA in the punk style of The Ramones
- Gabba, British punk guitarist with Chaos UK

== People with the surname ==
- Bassano Gabba (1844–1928), Italian lawyer and politician
- Carlo Francesco Gabba (1865–1920), Italian lawyer
- Giulia Gabba (born 1987), Italian tennis player

== Places ==
- The Gabba, a cricket ground in Brisbane, Australia
  - Woolloongabba, a suburb of Brisbane in which said cricket ground is located
- The Gabba Ward, a city council ward in Brisbane
- Gabba Island, an uninhabited Australian island south of Papua New Guinea
- Gabula (Syria), an ancient city near Aleppo historically known as Gabba

== Other uses ==
- Gabbeh or gabba, a type of Iranian pile rug of coarse quality

== See also ==
- Gabba Gabba Hey, a catchphrase associated with the band The Ramones
- Yo Gabba Gabba!, a children's television series on Nick Jr.
- Gaba (disambiguation)
- Gabbard
