= Badowo-Dańki =

- Village
- Location within Poland
- Coordinates: 51°57′6″N 20°32′48″E
- Country: Poland
- Voivodeship: Masovian
- County: Żyrardów
- Gmina: Mszczonów
- Elevation: 183 m (600 ft)
- Population: 240

Badowo-Dańki [baˈdɔvɔ ˈdaɲki] is a village in the administrative district of Gmina Mszczonów, within Żyrardów County, Masovian Voivodeship, in east-central Poland.
