= Lutkówka-Kolonia =

- Village
- Location within Poland
- Coordinates: 51°55′17″N 20°36′12″E
- Country: Poland
- Voivodeship: Masovian
- County: Żyrardów
- Gmina: Mszczonów
- Elevation: 191 m (627 ft)
- Population: 80

Lutkówka-Kolonia [lutˈkufka kɔˈlɔɲja] is a village in the administrative district of Gmina Mszczonów, within Żyrardów County, Masovian Voivodeship, in east-central Poland.
