= Czekaj, Żyrardów County =

Czekaj
- Village
- Location within Poland
- Coordinates: 51°58′54″N 20°29′26″E
- Country: Poland
- Voivodeship: Masovian
- County: Żyrardów
- Gmina: Mszczonów

Czekaj [ˈt͡ʂɛkai̯] is a village in the administrative district of Gmina Mszczonów, within Żyrardów County, Masovian Voivodeship, in east-central Poland.
