= Osuchów =

Osuchów may refer to the following places:

- Osuchów, Białobrzegi County in Masovian Voivodeship (east-central Poland)
- Osuchów, Zwoleń County in Masovian Voivodeship (east-central Poland)
- Osuchów, Żyrardów County in Masovian Voivodeship (east-central Poland)
- Osuchów, Greater Poland Voivodeship (west-central Poland)
