= Marków-Towarzystwo =

- Village
- Location within Poland
- Coordinates: 51°57′50″N 20°28′49″E
- Country: Poland
- Voivodeship: Masovian
- County: Żyrardów
- Gmina: Mszczonów
- Time zone: UTC+1 (CET)
  - Summer (DST): UTC+2 (CEST)

Marków-Towarzystwo [ˈmarkuf tɔvaˈʐɨstfɔ] is a village in the administrative district of Gmina Mszczonów, within Żyrardów County, Masovian Voivodeship, in east-central Poland.

Three Polish citizens were murdered by Nazi Germany in the village during World War II.
