= Grabce-Towarzystwo =

- Village
- Location within Poland
- Coordinates: 51°58′56″N 20°27′02″E
- Country: Poland
- Voivodeship: Masovian
- County: Żyrardów
- Gmina: Mszczonów

Grabce-Towarzystwo [ˈɡrapt͡sɛ tɔvaˈʐɨstfɔ] is a village in the administrative district of Gmina Mszczonów, within Żyrardów County, Masovian Voivodeship, in east-central Poland.
