= Zimnice =

- Village
- Location within Poland
- Coordinates: 51°55′N 20°33′E
- Country: Poland
- Voivodeship: Masovian
- County: Żyrardów
- Gmina: Mszczonów

Zimnice [ʑimˈnit͡sɛ] is a village in the administrative district of Gmina Mszczonów, within Żyrardów County, Masovian Voivodeship, in east-central Poland.
