= Świnice, Masovian Voivodeship =

Świnice
- Village
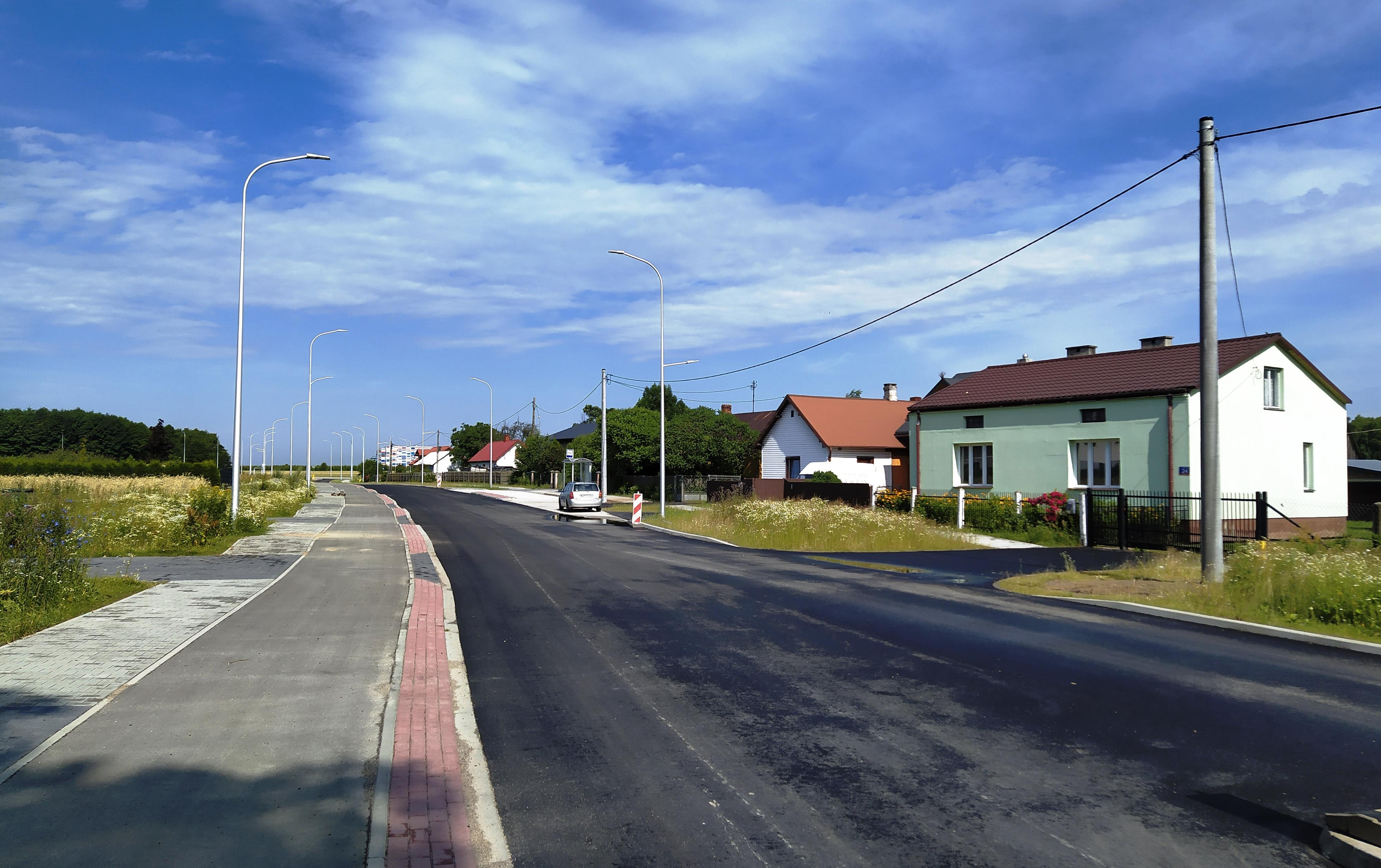

- Location within Poland
- Coordinates: 51°59′N 20°29′E
- Country: Poland
- Voivodeship: Masovian
- County: Żyrardów
- Gmina: Mszczonów

Świnice [ɕfiˈnit͡sɛ] is a village in the administrative district of Gmina Mszczonów, within Żyrardów County, Masovian Voivodeship, in east-central Poland.
