= Tłumy =

Village in Gmina Mszczonów, Poland

- Village
- Location within Poland
- Coordinates: 51°56′14″N 20°37′13″E
- Country: Poland
- Voivodeship: Masovian
- County: Żyrardów
- Gmina: Mszczonów

Tłumy [ˈtwumɨ] is a village in the administrative district of Gmina Mszczonów, within Żyrardów County, Masovian Voivodeship, in east-central Poland.
