= Chudolipie =

- Village
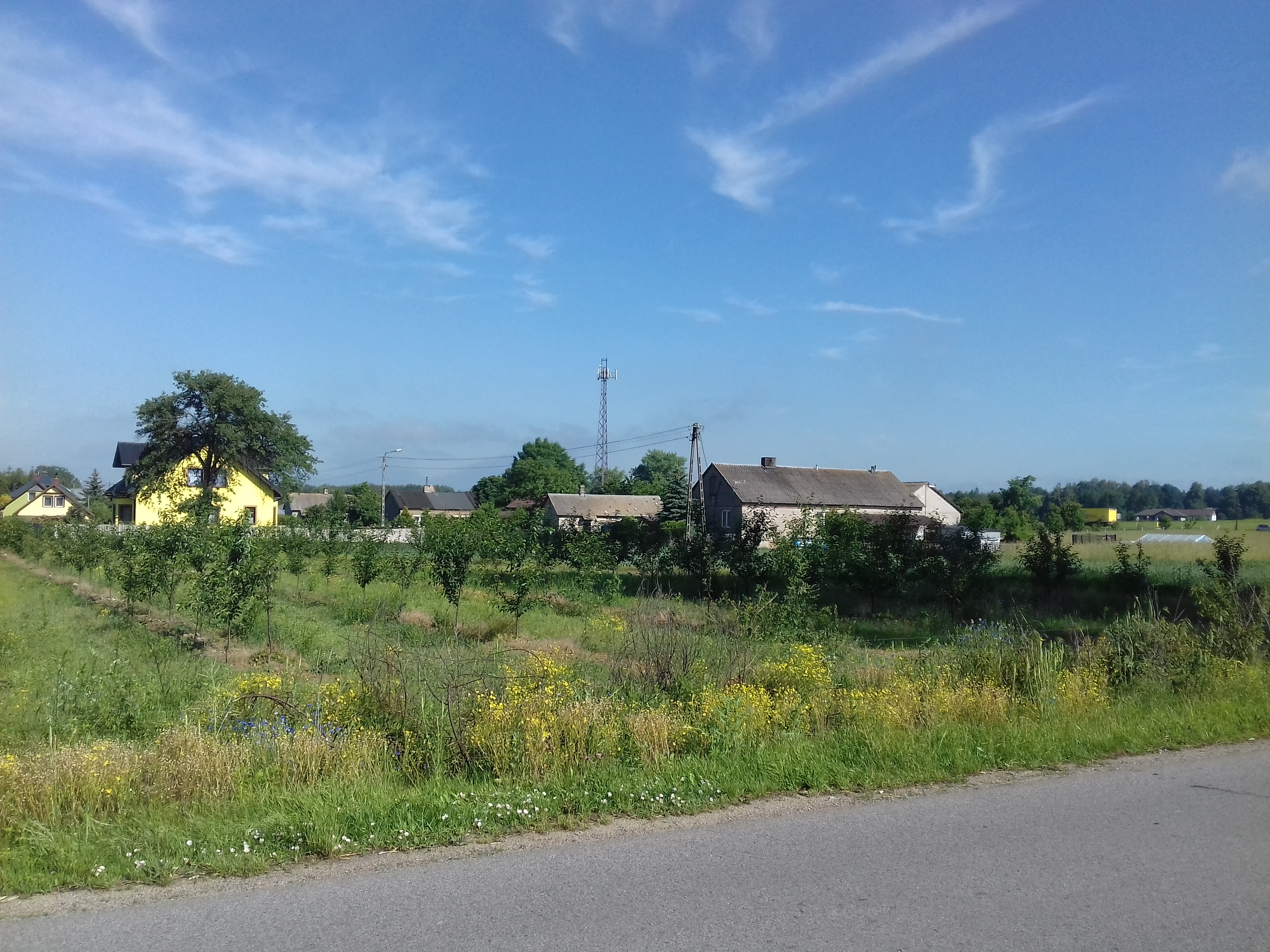
- Houses in the village

- Location within Poland
- Coordinates: 51°55′59″N 20°37′56″E
- Country: Poland
- Voivodeship: Masovian
- County: Żyrardów
- Gmina: Mszczonów
- Elevation: 189 m (620 ft)

Population
  - Total: 50

Chudolipie [xudɔˈlipjɛ] is a village in the administrative district of Gmina Mszczonów, within Żyrardów County, Masovian Voivodeship, in east-central Poland.
