= Solar eclipse of October 25, 2022 =

Partial solar eclipse

- Partial eclipse
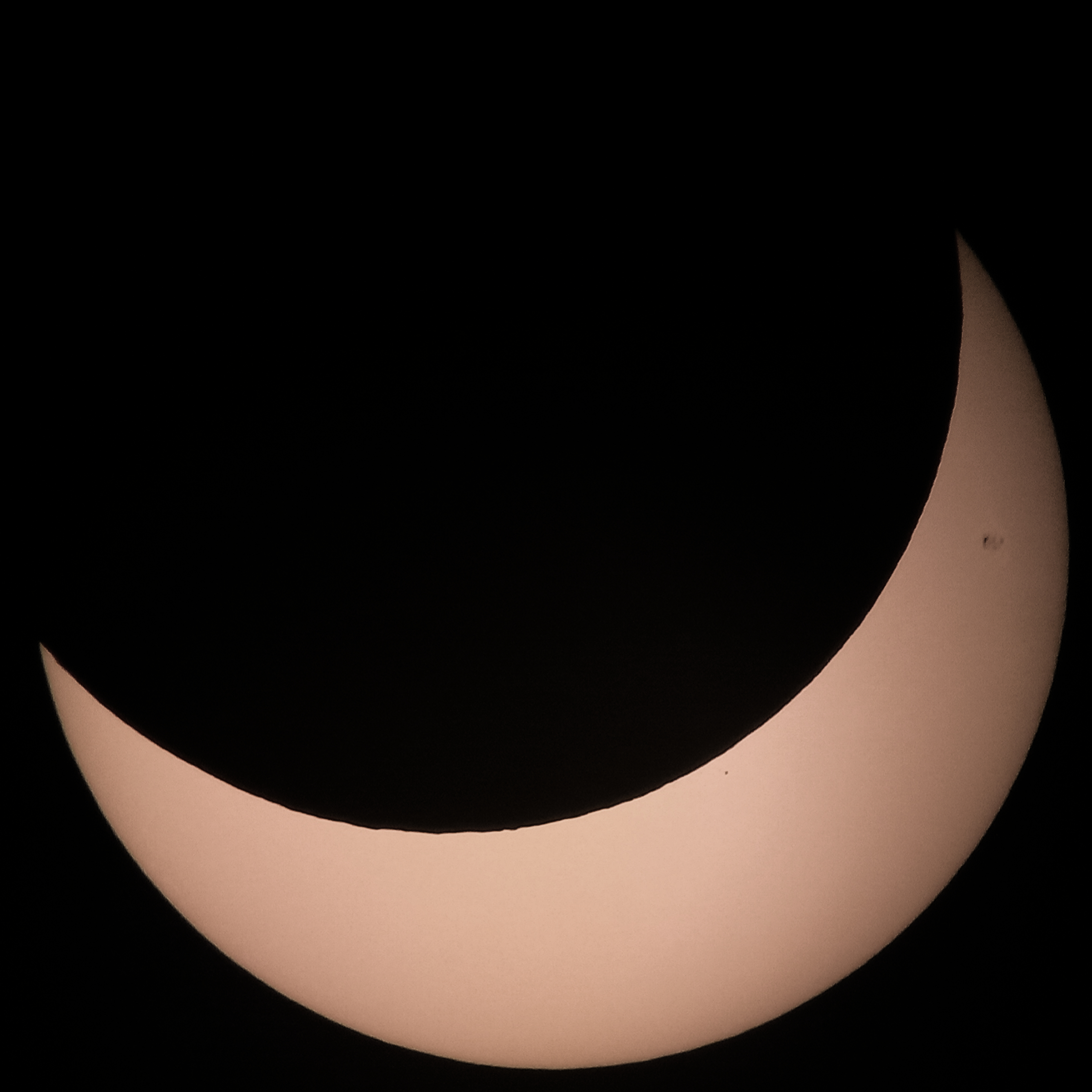
- Partial from Saratov, Russia

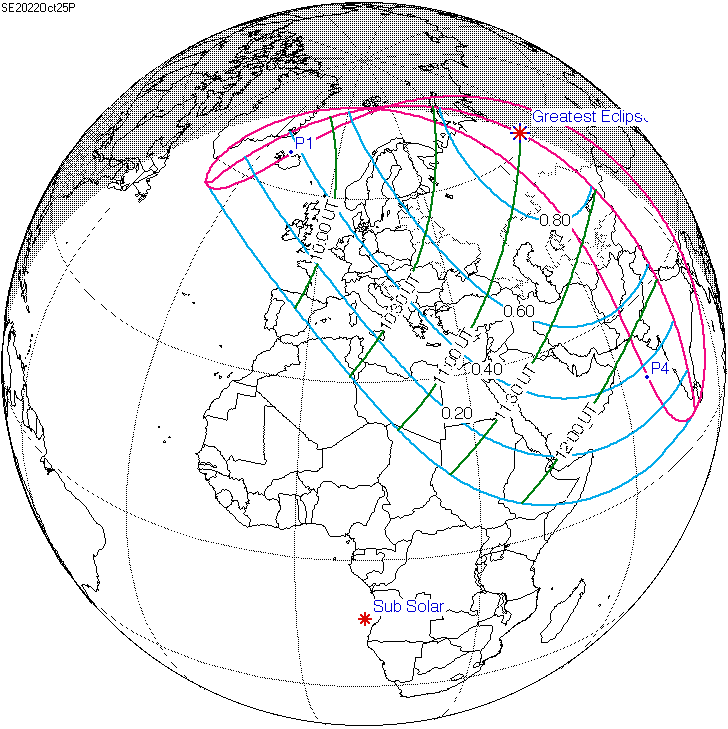
- Map
- Gamma: 1.0701
- Magnitude: 0.8623

Maximum eclipse
- Coordinates: 61.6°N 77.4°E

Times (UTC)
- Greatest eclipse: 11:01:20

References
- Saros: 124 (55 of 73)
- Catalog # (SE5000): 9558

A partial solar eclipse occurred at the Moon’s descending node of orbit on Tuesday, October 25, 2022, with a magnitude of 0.8623.

The eclipse was visible from Europe, Central Asia, West Asia, South Asia and from Northeast Africa. The maximal phase of the partial eclipse occurred on the West Siberian Plain in Russia near Nizhnevartovsk, where more than 82% of the Sun was eclipsed by the Moon. In India, the Sun was eclipsed during sunset ranging from 58% in the north and around 2% in the south. From Western Europe it appeared to be around 15-30% eclipsed. It was visible between 08:58 UTC, the greatest point of eclipse occurred at 11:00 UTC and it ended at 13:02 UTC. A solar eclipse occurs when the Moon passes between Earth and the Sun, thereby totally or partly obscuring the image of the Sun for a viewer on Earth. A partial solar eclipse occurs in the polar regions of the Earth when the center of the Moon's shadow misses the Earth.

The eclipse was featured in Dune: Part Two, directed by Denis Villenueve. The film was recorded in the Jordanian Desert.

During the eclipse, Femmes et Sciences partnered with the event "Eclipses: Women Scientists or the Hidden Face of History," organised at the Paris Observatory to launch the Hypatia Project for the Eiffel Tower. The project proposed completing the list of great scientists by adding the names of women scientists.

== Gallery ==
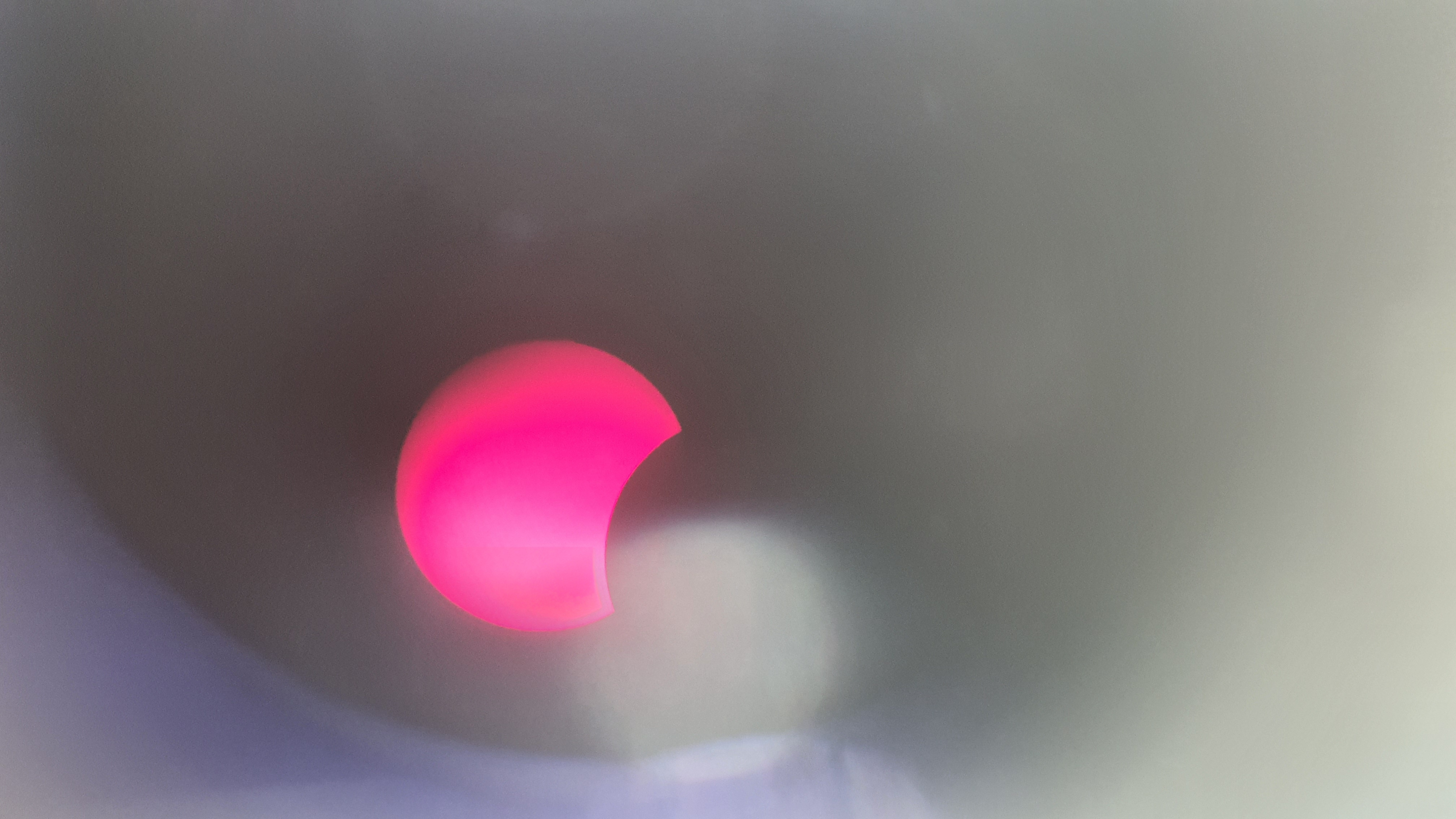
Telescopic view from Milton Keynes, England, 10:02 UTC

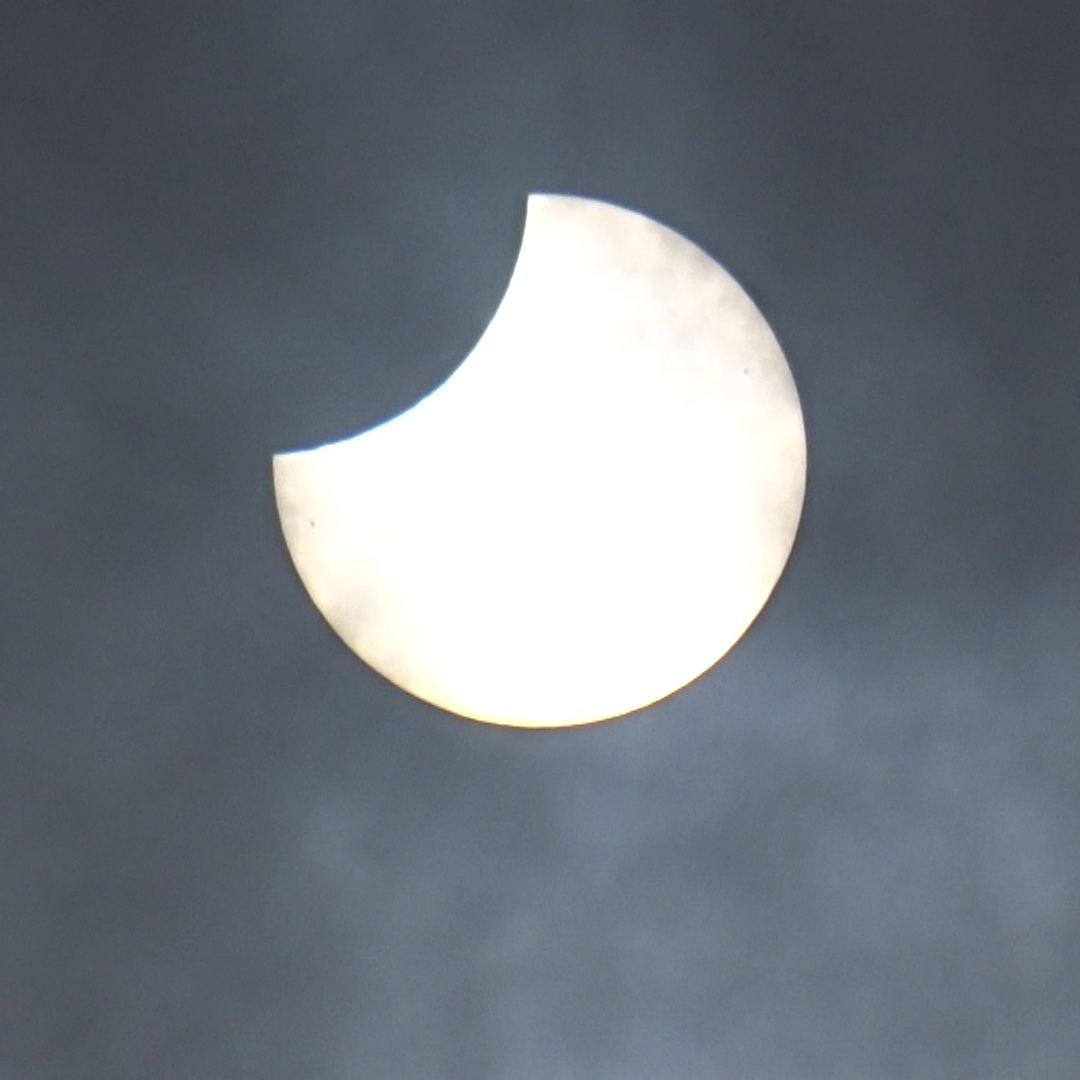
From Novate Milanese, Italy, 10:08 UTC

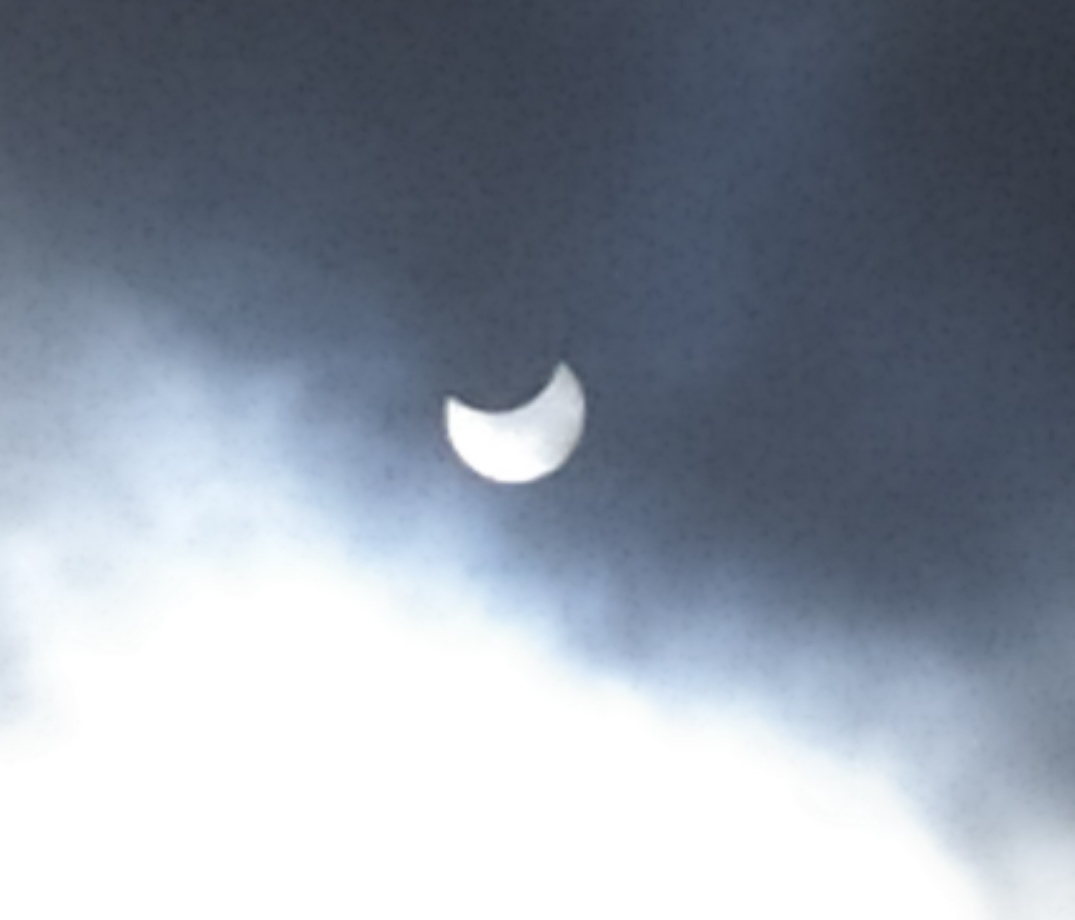
From Lutkówka, Poland, 10:11 UTC

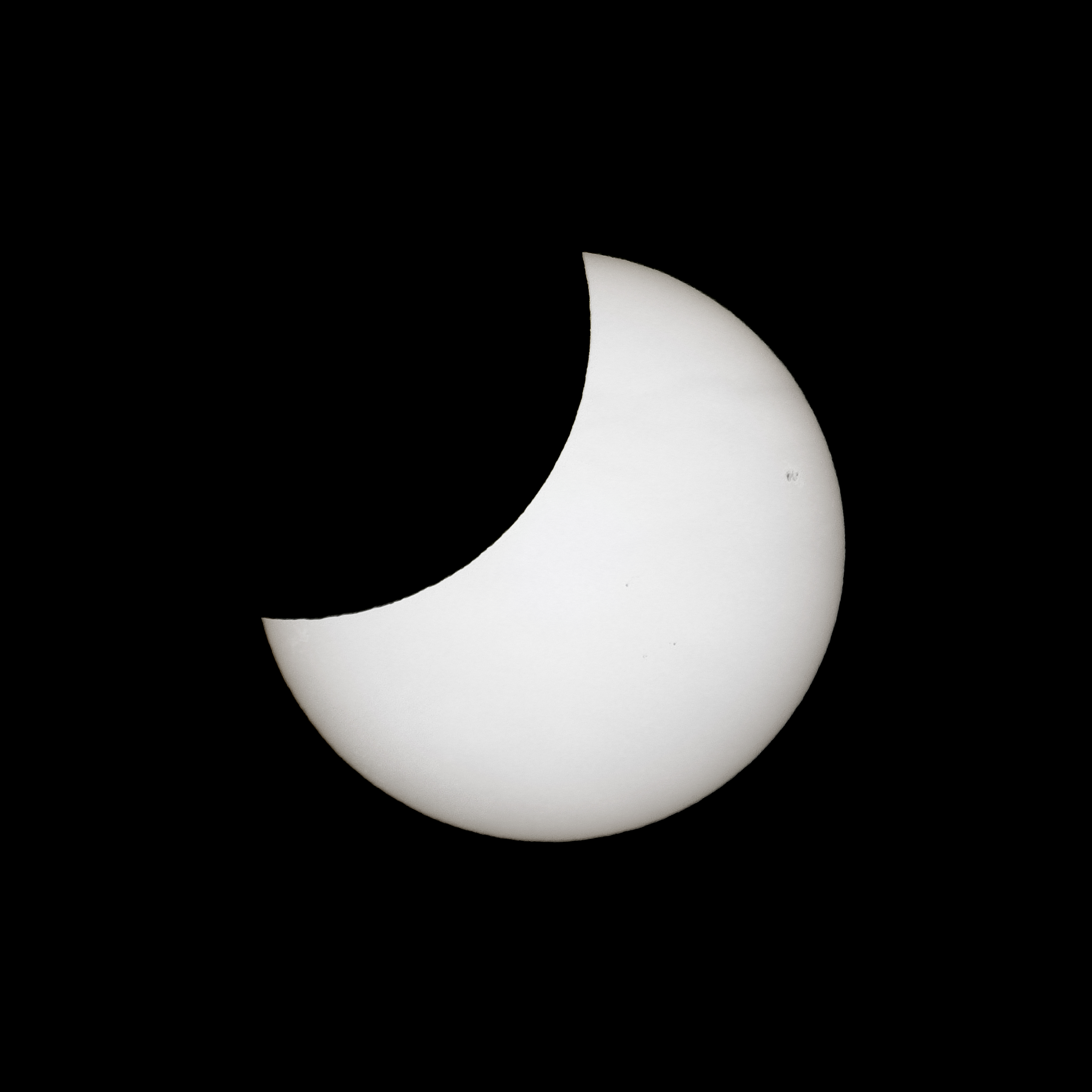
From Berlin, Germany, 10:24 UTC

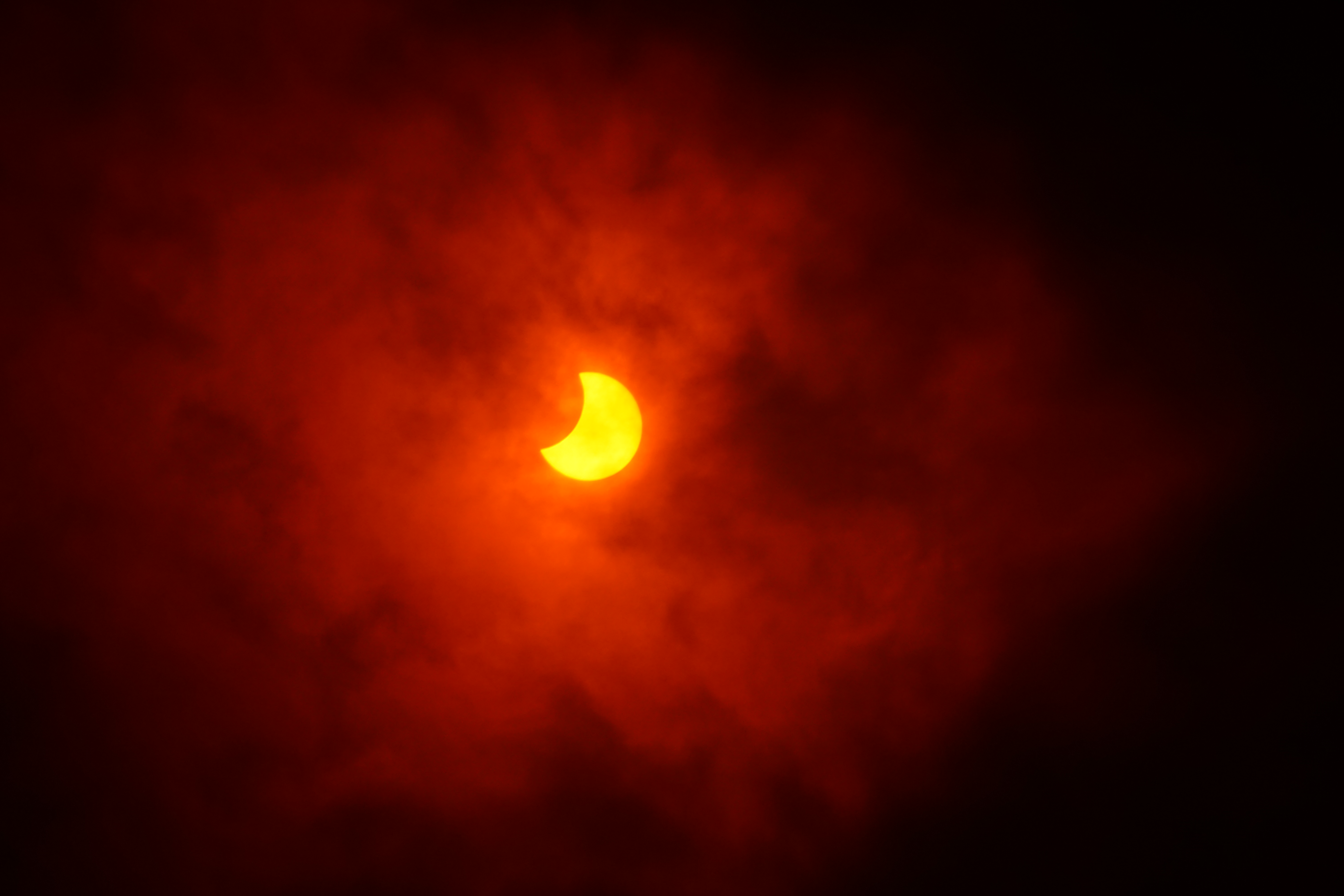
From Žilina, Slovak Republic, 10:39 UTC

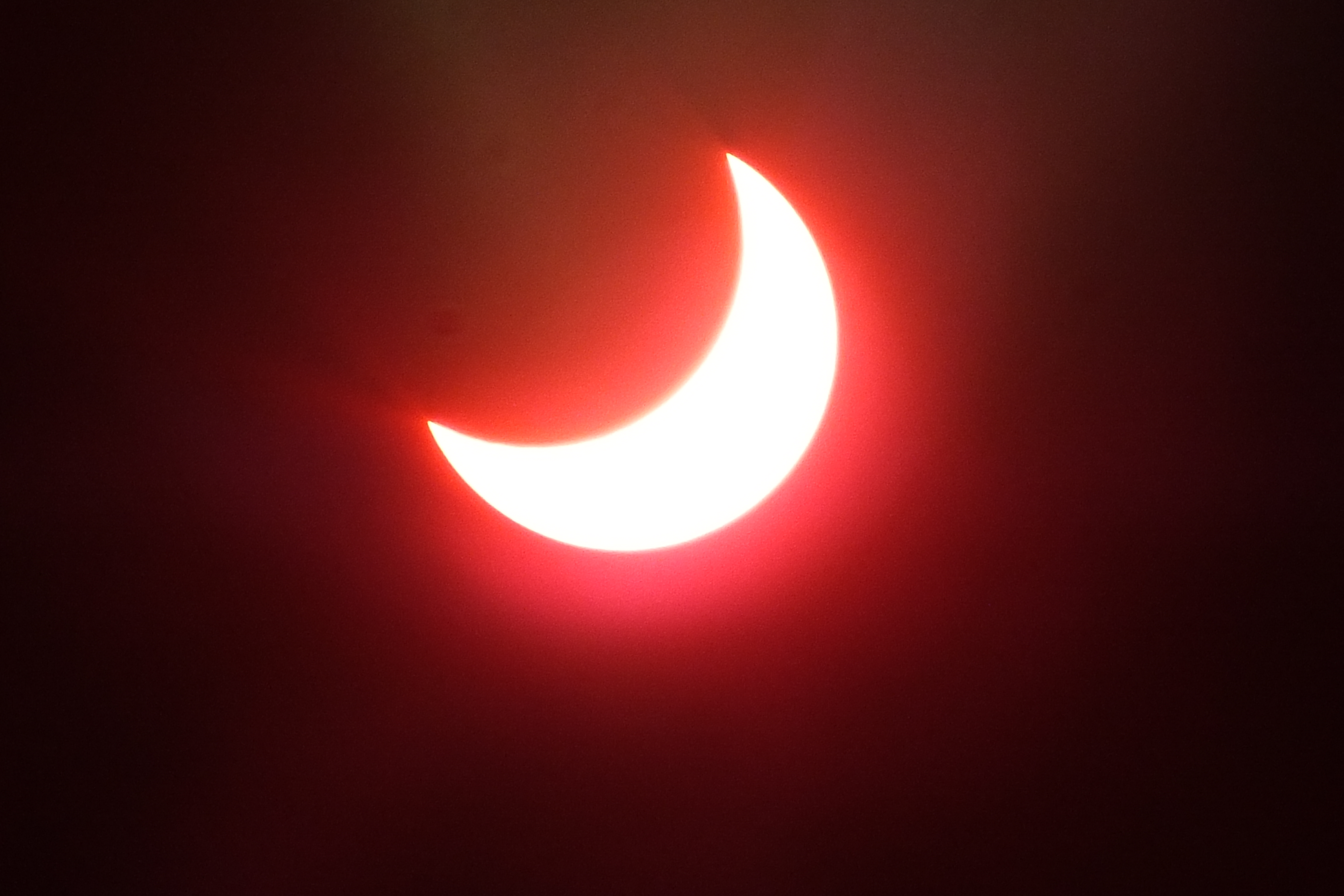
From Moscow, Russia, 10:47 UTC

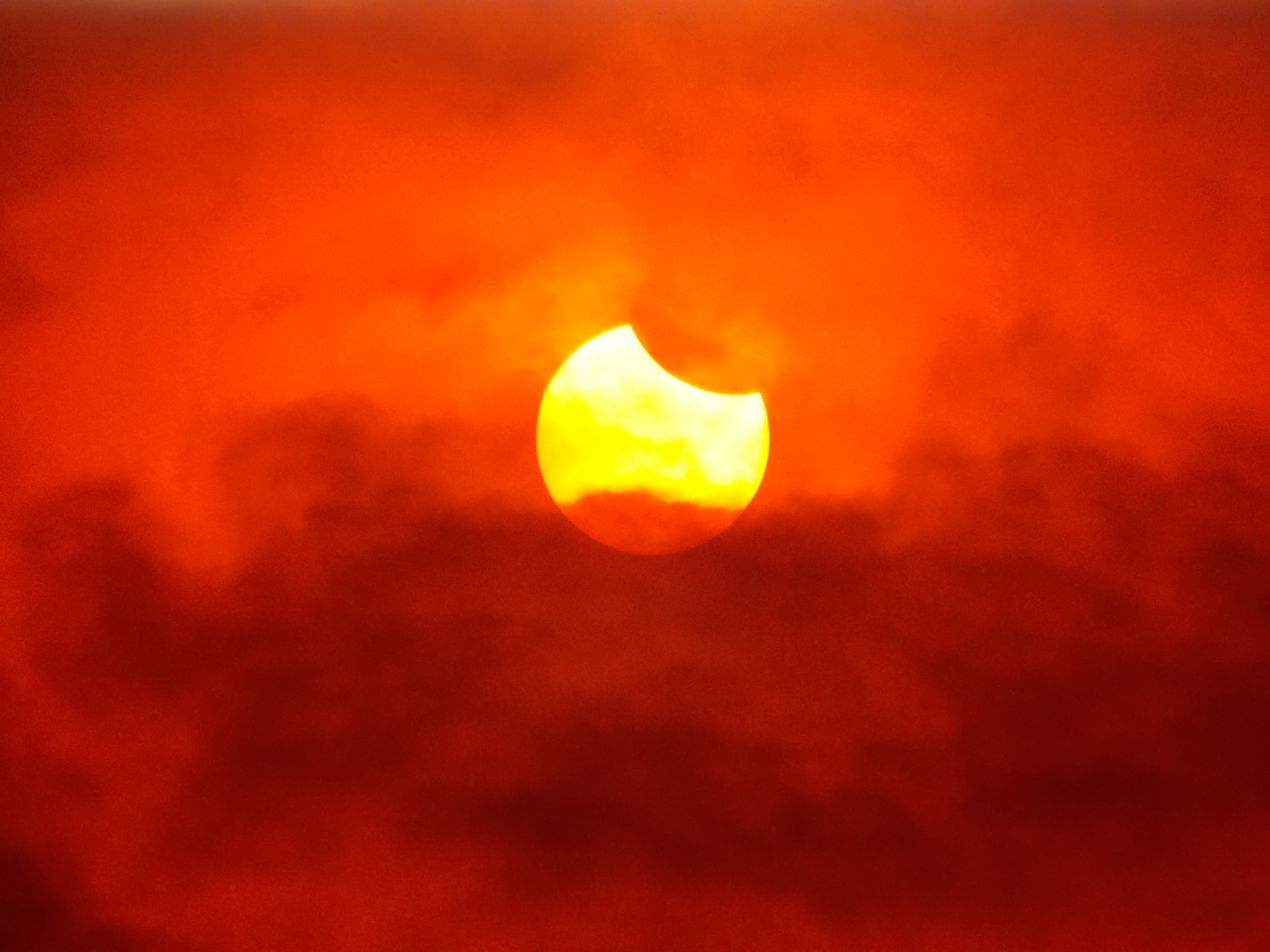
From Poltava, Ukraine, 10:48 UTC

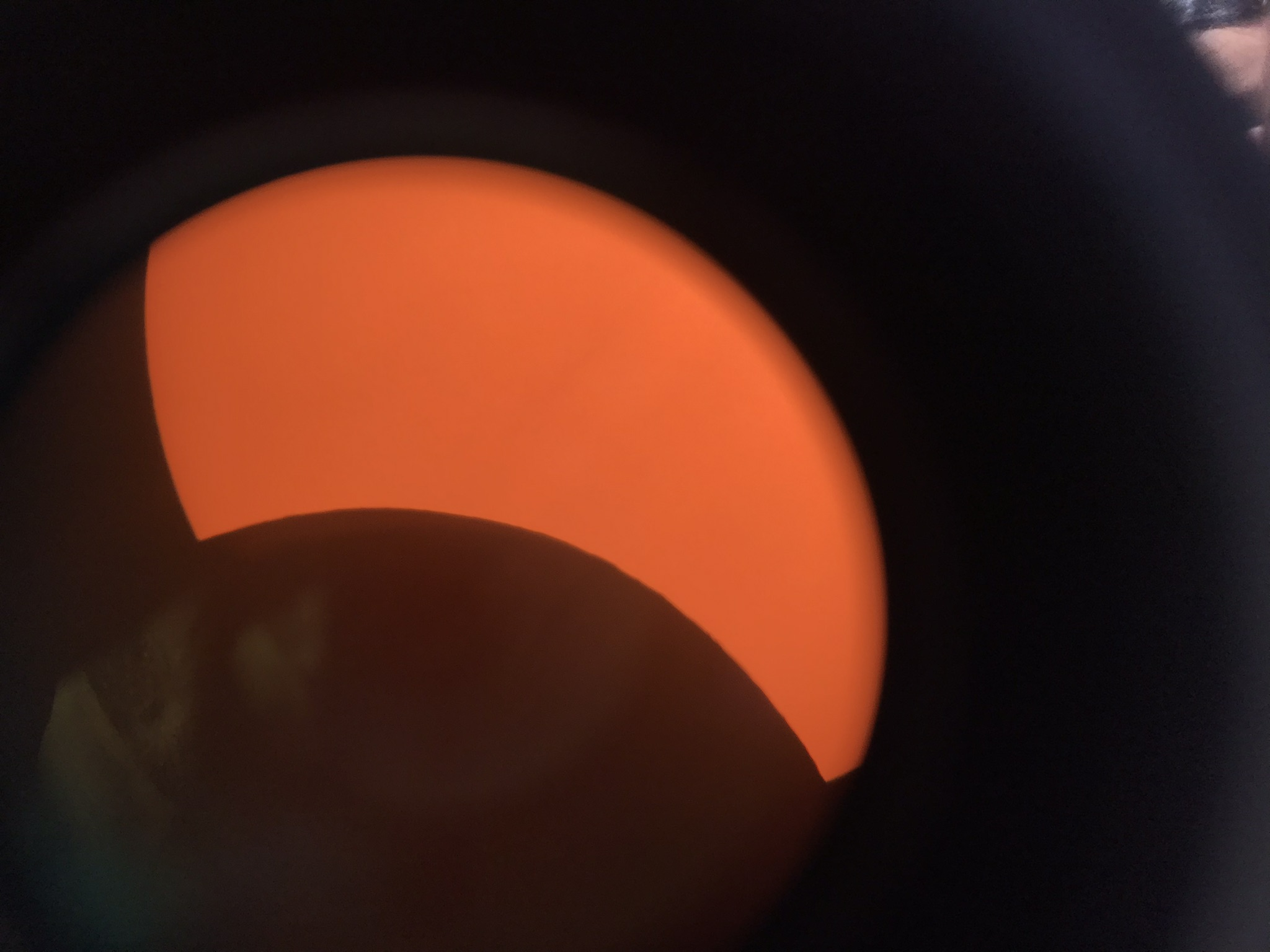
Telescopic view from Istanbul, Turkey, 11:02 UTC

Observed in Kiryat Ata, Israel

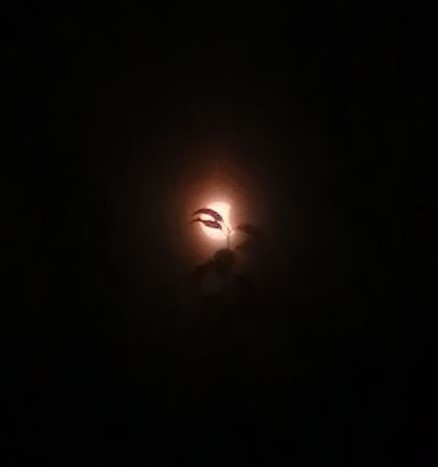
From Dushanbe, Tajikistan, 12:07 UTC

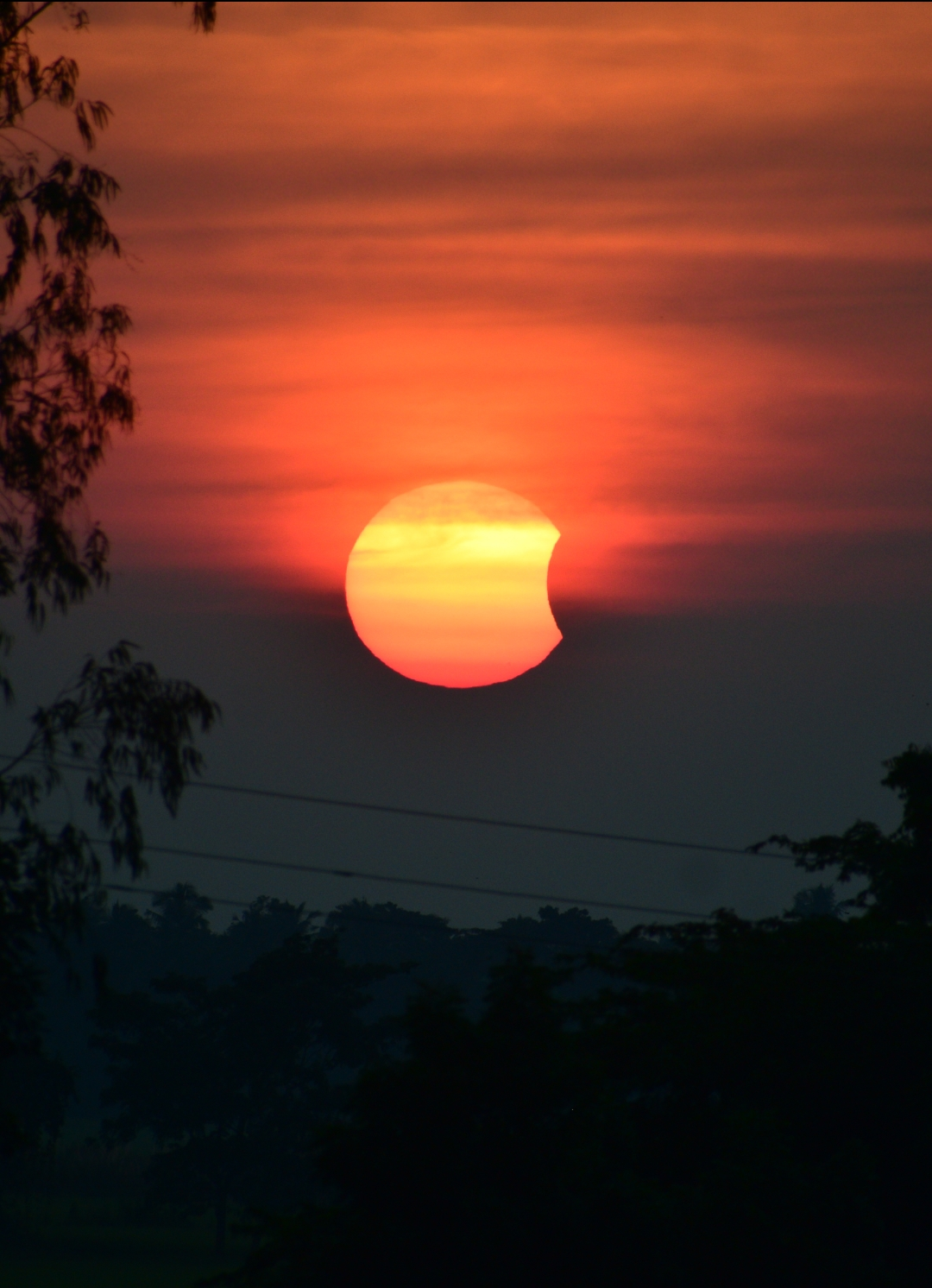
From Bhubaneswar, India, 12:11 UTC

Animation from Belfort, France

A transit of a bird during the eclipse from Kumbakonam, India

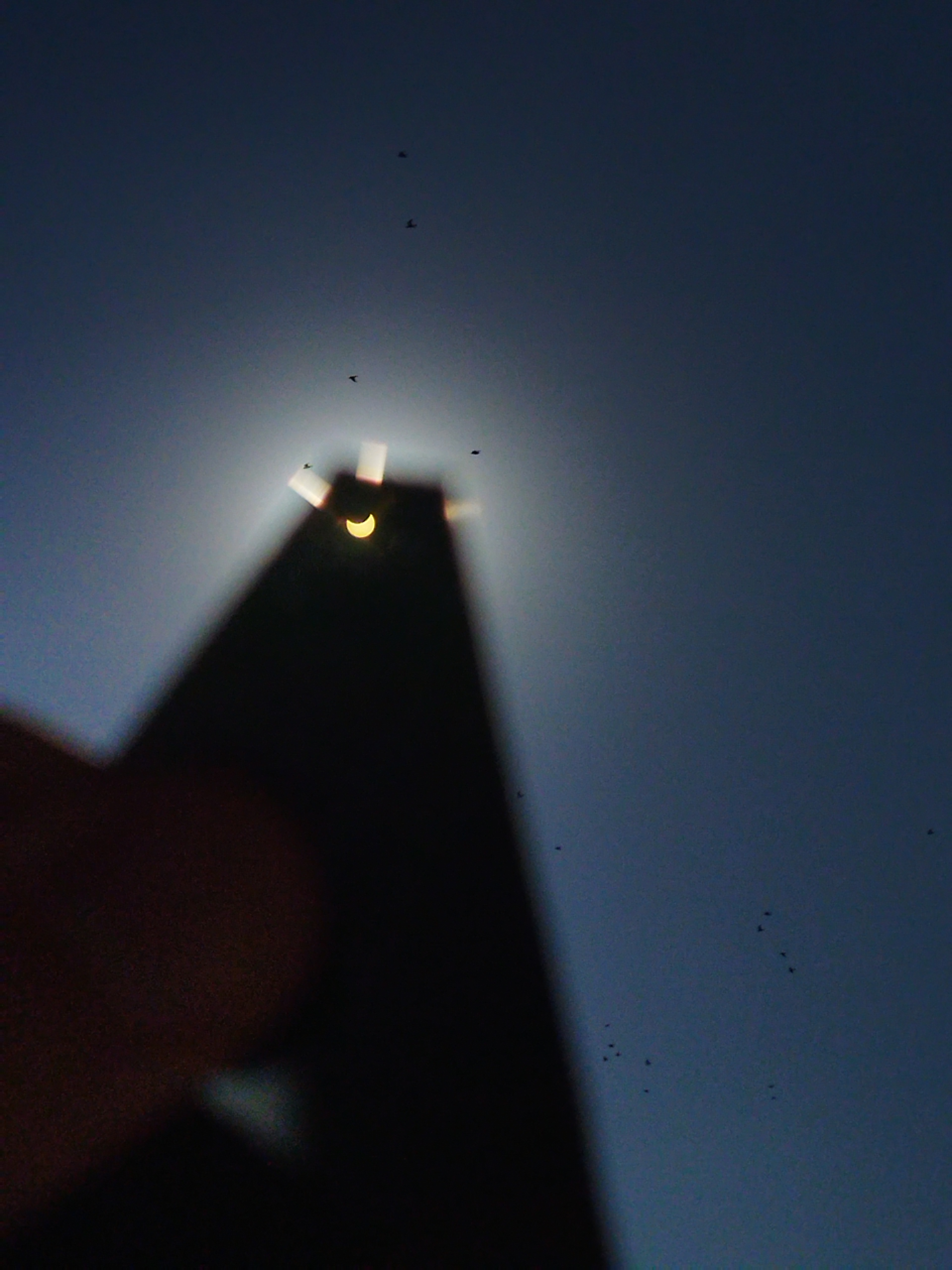
Birds passing by while eclipse is happening. Ankara, Turkey, at 10:43 UTC

== Eclipse timing ==
=== Places experiencing partial eclipse ===
Solar Eclipse of October 25, 2022 (Local Times)
Country or territory	City or place	Start of partial eclipse	Maximum eclipse	End of partial eclipse	Duration of eclipse (hr:min)	Maximum coverage
Norway	Tromsø	11:07:57	12:13:02	13:18:36	2:11	55.63%
Sweden	Stockholm	11:08:10	12:15:28	13:23:36	2:15	46.24%
Svalbard and Jan Mayen	Longyearbyen	11:36:15 (sunrise)	12:21:29	13:13:06	1:37	53.26%
Finland	Helsinki	12:12:02	13:21:43	14:31:33	2:20	54.06%
Estonia	Tallinn	12:12:11	13:22:01	14:32:01	2:20	53.26%
Latvia	Riga	12:12:55	13:23:08	14:33:34	2:21	50.32%
Poland	Warsaw	11:14:07	12:23:21	13:33:09	2:19	41.46%
Lithuania	Vilnius	12:15:09	13:26:18	14:37:28	2:22	49.40%
Belarus	Minsk	12:17:26	13:29:39	14:41:34	2:24	51.26%
Ukraine	Kyiv	12:22:59	13:37:02	14:50:07	2:27	51.34%
Romania	Bucharest	12:26:35	13:38:33	14:50:01	2:23	38.51%
Moldova	Chișinău	12:25:20	13:39:02	14:51:52	2:27	45.46%
Russia	Moscow	12:24:47	13:39:03	14:51:38	2:27	63.41%
Turkey	Ankara	12:39:43	13:55:06	15:08:13	2:29	42.05%
Georgia	Tbilisi	13:50:41	15:09:05	16:22:46	2:32	58.04%
Armenia	Yerevan	13:52:57	15:11:22	16:24:54	2:32	55.94%
Kazakhstan	Astana	16:06:33	17:17:33	18:01:48 (sunset)	1:55	78.44%
Azerbaijan	Baku	13:59:47	15:17:52	16:30:13	2:30	60.65%
Iraq	Baghdad	13:06:33	14:23:40	15:35:11	2:29	46.33%
Iran	Tehran	13:41:12	14:58:25	16:09:08	2:28	55.38%
Turkmenistan	Ashgabat	15:16:22	16:31:58	17:40:47	2:24	62.02%
Uzbekistan	Tashkent	15:23:13	16:34:46	17:27:46 (sunset)	2:05	68.33%
Kyrgyzstan	Bishkek	16:25:38	17:35:01	18:04:11 (sunset)	1:39	69.87%
Kazakhstan	Almaty	16:27:04	17:35:26	17:54:18 (sunset)	1:27	69.91%
Kuwait	Kuwait City	13:20:36	14:35:42	15:44:24	2:24	42.89%
Tajikistan	Dushanbe	15:28:18	16:39:29	17:33:40 (sunset)	2:05	64.43%
China	Kashgar	18:34:04	19:41:55	20:03:36 (sunset)	1:30	64.65%
Afghanistan	Kabul	15:07:27	16:17:02	17:07:21 (sunset)	2:00	57.76%
Pakistan	Islamabad	15:43:35	16:50:38	17:22:47 (sunset)	1:39	55.56%
India	New Delhi	16:29:18	17:30:35	17:42:02 (sunset)	1:13	43.95%

== Eclipse details ==
Shown below are two tables displaying details about this particular solar eclipse. The first table outlines times at which the Moon's penumbra or umbra attains the specific parameter, and the second table describes various other parameters pertaining to this eclipse.

October 25, 2022 Solar Eclipse Times
Event	Time (UTC)
First Penumbral External Contact	2022 October 25 at 08:59:30.9 UTC
Equatorial Conjunction	2022 October 25 at 10:04:55.9 UTC
Ecliptic Conjunction	2022 October 25 at 10:49:51.4 UTC
Greatest Eclipse	2022 October 25 at 11:01:20.0 UTC
Last Penumbral External Contact	2022 October 25 at 13:03:26.7 UTC

October 25, 2022 Solar Eclipse Parameters
Parameter	Value
Eclipse Magnitude	0.86189
Eclipse Obscuration	0.82075
Gamma	1.07014
Sun Right Ascension	13h59m20.5s
Sun Declination	-12°10'17.0"
Sun Semi-Diameter	16'05.0"
Sun Equatorial Horizontal Parallax	08.8"
Moon Right Ascension	14h01m10.9s
Moon Declination	-11°14'16.0"
Moon Semi-Diameter	15'52.6"
Moon Equatorial Horizontal Parallax	0°58'16.0"
ΔT	70.9 s

== Eclipse season ==
This eclipse is part of an eclipse season, a period, roughly every six months, when eclipses occur. Only two (or occasionally three) eclipse seasons occur each year, and each season lasts about 35 days and repeats just short of six months (173 days) later; thus two full eclipse seasons always occur each year. Either two or three eclipses happen each eclipse season. In the sequence below, each eclipse is separated by a fortnight.

Eclipse season of October–November 2022
October 25 Descending node (new moon)	November 8 Ascending node (full moon)
Partial solar eclipse Solar Saros 124	Total lunar eclipse Lunar Saros 136

== Related eclipses ==
=== Eclipses in 2022 ===
- A partial solar eclipse on April 30.
- A total lunar eclipse on May 16.
- A partial solar eclipse on October 25.
- A total lunar eclipse on November 8.

=== Metonic ===
- Preceded by: Solar eclipse of January 6, 2019
- Followed by: Solar eclipse of August 12, 2026

=== Tzolkinex ===
- Preceded by: Solar eclipse of September 13, 2015
- Followed by: Solar eclipse of December 5, 2029

=== Half-Saros ===
- Preceded by: Lunar eclipse of October 18, 2013
- Followed by: Lunar eclipse of October 30, 2031

=== Tritos ===
- Preceded by: Solar eclipse of November 25, 2011
- Followed by: Solar eclipse of September 23, 2033

=== Solar Saros 124 ===
- Preceded by: Solar eclipse of October 14, 2004
- Followed by: Solar eclipse of November 4, 2040

=== Inex ===
- Preceded by: Solar eclipse of November 13, 1993
- Followed by: Solar eclipse of October 4, 2051

=== Triad ===
- Preceded by: Solar eclipse of December 25, 1935
- Followed by: Solar eclipse of August 26, 2109

=== Solar eclipses of 2022–2025 ===
Solar eclipse series sets from 2022 to 2025
Ascending node			Descending node		
Saros	Map	Gamma	Saros	Map	Gamma
119 Partial in CTIO, Chile	April 30, 2022 Partial	−1.19008	124 Partial from Saratov, Russia	October 25, 2022 Partial	1.07014
129 Totality from Exmouth, WA	April 20, 2023 Hybrid	−0.39515	134 Mexican Hat, UT	October 14, 2023 Annular	0.37534
139 Totality in Dallas, TX	April 8, 2024 Total	0.34314	144 Tres Cerros, Argentina	October 2, 2024 Annular	−0.35087
149 Partial from Halifax, NS	March 29, 2025 Partial	1.04053	154	September 21, 2025 Partial	−1.06509

=== Saros 124 ===
This eclipse is a part of Saros series 124, repeating every 18 years, 11 days, and containing 73 events. The series started with a partial solar eclipse on March 6, 1049. It contains total eclipses from June 12, 1211 through September 22, 1968, and a hybrid eclipse on October 3, 1986. There are no annular eclipses in this set. The series ends at member 73 as a partial eclipse on May 11, 2347. Its eclipses are tabulated in three columns; every third eclipse in the same column is one exeligmos apart, so they all cast shadows over approximately the same parts of the Earth.

The longest duration of totality was produced by member 39 at 5 minutes, 46 seconds on May 3, 1734. All eclipses in this series occur at the Moon’s descending node of orbit.

Series members 43–64 occur between 1801 and 2200:
43	44	45
June 16, 1806	June 26, 1824	July 8, 1842
46	47	48
July 18, 1860	July 29, 1878	August 9, 1896
49	50	51
August 21, 1914	August 31, 1932	September 12, 1950
52	53	54
September 22, 1968	October 3, 1986	October 14, 2004
55	56	57
October 25, 2022	November 4, 2040	November 16, 2058
58	59	60
November 26, 2076	December 7, 2094	December 19, 2112
61	62	63
December 30, 2130	January 9, 2149	January 21, 2167
64
January 31, 2185

=== Metonic series ===
The metonic series repeats eclipses every 19 years (6939.69 days), lasting about 5 cycles. Eclipses occur in nearly the same calendar date. In addition, the octon subseries repeats 1/5 of that or every 3.8 years (1387.94 days). All eclipses in this table occur at the Moon's descending node.

22 eclipse events between June 1, 2011 and October 24, 2098
May 31–June 1	March 19–20	January 5–6	October 24–25	August 12–13
118	120	122	124	126
June 1, 2011	March 20, 2015	January 6, 2019	October 25, 2022	August 12, 2026
128	130	132	134	136
June 1, 2030	March 20, 2034	January 5, 2038	October 25, 2041	August 12, 2045
138	140	142	144	146
May 31, 2049	March 20, 2053	January 5, 2057	October 24, 2060	August 12, 2064
148	150	152	154	156
May 31, 2068	March 19, 2072	January 6, 2076	October 24, 2079	August 13, 2083
158	160	162	164	
June 1, 2087			October 24, 2098	

=== Tritos series ===
This eclipse is a part of a tritos cycle, repeating at alternating nodes every 135 synodic months (≈ 3986.63 days, or 11 years minus 1 month). Their appearance and longitude are irregular due to a lack of synchronization with the anomalistic month (period of perigee), but groupings of 3 tritos cycles (≈ 33 years minus 3 months) come close (≈ 434.044 anomalistic months), so eclipses are similar in these groupings.

Series members between 1837 and 2200
April 5, 1837 (Saros 107)	March 5, 1848 (Saros 108)	February 3, 1859 (Saros 109)		December 2, 1880 (Saros 111)
		August 31, 1913 (Saros 114)	July 31, 1924 (Saros 115)	June 30, 1935 (Saros 116)
May 30, 1946 (Saros 117)	April 30, 1957 (Saros 118)	March 28, 1968 (Saros 119)	February 26, 1979 (Saros 120)	January 26, 1990 (Saros 121)
December 25, 2000 (Saros 122)	November 25, 2011 (Saros 123)	October 25, 2022 (Saros 124)	September 23, 2033 (Saros 125)	August 23, 2044 (Saros 126)
July 24, 2055 (Saros 127)	June 22, 2066 (Saros 128)	May 22, 2077 (Saros 129)	April 21, 2088 (Saros 130)	March 21, 2099 (Saros 131)
February 18, 2110 (Saros 132)	January 19, 2121 (Saros 133)	December 19, 2131 (Saros 134)	November 17, 2142 (Saros 135)	October 17, 2153 (Saros 136)
September 16, 2164 (Saros 137)	August 16, 2175 (Saros 138)	July 16, 2186 (Saros 139)	June 15, 2197 (Saros 140)	

=== Inex series ===
This eclipse is a part of the long period inex cycle, repeating at alternating nodes, every 358 synodic months (≈ 10,571.95 days, or 29 years minus 20 days). Their appearance and longitude are irregular due to a lack of synchronization with the anomalistic month (period of perigee). However, groupings of 3 inex cycles (≈ 87 years minus 2 months) comes close (≈ 1,151.02 anomalistic months), so eclipses are similar in these groupings.

Series members between 1801 and 2200
March 14, 1820 (Saros 117)	February 23, 1849 (Saros 118)	February 2, 1878 (Saros 119)
January 14, 1907 (Saros 120)	December 25, 1935 (Saros 121)	December 4, 1964 (Saros 122)
November 13, 1993 (Saros 123)	October 25, 2022 (Saros 124)	October 4, 2051 (Saros 125)
September 13, 2080 (Saros 126)	August 26, 2109 (Saros 127)	August 5, 2138 (Saros 128)
July 16, 2167 (Saros 129)	June 26, 2196 (Saros 130)	
