= Lutkówka, Masovian Voivodeship =

Lutkówka
- Village
- Location within Poland
- Coordinates: 51°55′22″N 20°37′24″E
- Country: Poland
- Voivodeship: Masovian
- County: Żyrardów
- Gmina: Mszczonów
- Elevation: 192 m (630 ft)
- Population (approx.): 100

Lutkówka [lutˈkufka] is a village in the administrative district of Gmina Mszczonów, within Żyrardów County, Masovian Voivodeship, in east-central Poland.
