= Bronisławka, Żyrardów County =

Bronisławka
- Village
- Location within Poland
- Coordinates: 51°54′27″N 20°39′20″E
- Country: Poland
- Voivodeship: Masovian
- County: Żyrardów
- Gmina: Mszczonów
- Elevation: 193 m (633 ft)

Bronisławka ([brɔniˈswafka], formerly Bronisławów Osuchowski) is a village in the administrative district of Gmina Mszczonów, within Żyrardów County, Masovian Voivodeship, in east-central Poland.
