= Osuchów, Żyrardów County =

Osuchów
- Village
- Location within Poland
- Coordinates: 51°53′52″N 20°35′14″E
- Country: Poland
- Voivodeship: Masovian
- County: Żyrardów
- Gmina: Mszczonów
- Elevation: 200 m (660 ft)
- Population (approx.): 370

Osuchów [ɔˈsuxuf] is a village in the administrative district of Gmina Mszczonów, within Żyrardów County, Masovian Voivodeship, in east-central Poland.
