= Sosnowica, Masovian Voivodeship =

Sosnowica
- Village
- Location within Poland
- Coordinates: 51°57′30″N 20°32′24″E
- Country: Poland
- Voivodeship: Masovian
- County: Żyrardów
- Gmina: Mszczonów

Sosnowica [sɔsnɔˈvit͡sa] is a village in the administrative district of Gmina Mszczonów, within Żyrardów County, Masovian Voivodeship, in east-central Poland.

== Climate ==
Winter lasts from November to March, with relatively low temperatures; the average high in January is around 1–4 °C, while the average low typically falls below freezing, accompanied by frequent snowfall and overcast conditions.

Spring begins in April and continues until May, during which temperatures gradually rise, snow melts, and daylight hours increase. Summer (June–August) is the warmest period of the year, with average highs ranging from 23 to 26 °C, long sunny days, and moderate rainfall. In autumn (September–October), temperatures gradually decrease, daylight hours shorten, rainfall increases.
