= Powązki, Żyrardów County =

Powązki
- Village
- Location within Poland
- Coordinates: 51°57′N 20°28′E
- Country: Poland
- Voivodeship: Masovian
- County: Żyrardów
- Gmina: Mszczonów

Powązki [pɔˈvɔ̃ski] is a village in the administrative district of Gmina Mszczonów, within Żyrardów County, Masovian Voivodeship, in east-central Poland.
