= Strzyże, Żyrardów County =

Strzyże
- Village
- Location within Poland
- Coordinates: 51°55′14″N 20°33′57″E
- Country: Poland
- Voivodeship: Masovian
- County: Żyrardów
- Gmina: Mszczonów
- Elevation: 200 m (660 ft)

Strzyże [ˈstʂɨʐɛ] is a village in the administrative district of Gmina Mszczonów, within Żyrardów County, Masovian Voivodeship, in east-central Poland.
