= Kowiesy, Żyrardów County =

Kowiesy
- Village
- Location within Poland
- Coordinates: 51°53′54″N 20°32′0″E
- Country: Poland
- Voivodeship: Masovian
- County: Żyrardów
- Gmina: Mszczonów
- Population: 30

Kowiesy [kɔˈvjɛsɨ] is a village in the administrative district of Gmina Mszczonów, within Żyrardów County, Masovian Voivodeship, in east-central Poland.
