= Gmina Mszczonów =

Gmina Mszczonów Mszczonów Commune
- Gmina
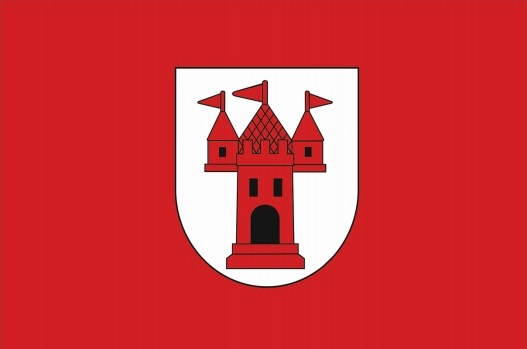
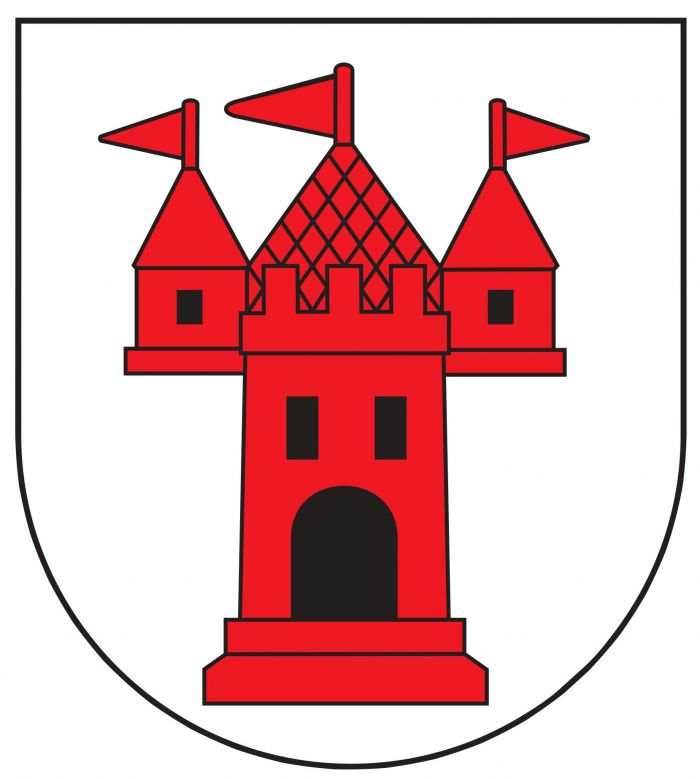
- Flag Coat of arms
- Interactive map of Gmina Mszczonów
- Coordinates (Mszczonów): 51°58′27″N 20°31′36″E
- Country: Poland
- Voivodeship: Masovian
- County: Żyrardów
- Seat: Mszczonów

Area
  - Total: 144.87 km^{2} (55.93 sq mi)

Population (2006)
  - Total: 11,176
  - Density: 77.145/km^{2} (199.80/sq mi)
  - Urban: 6,231
  - Rural: 4,945
- Website: http://www.mszczonow.pl/

Gmina Mszczonów is an urban-rural gmina (administrative district) in Żyrardów County, Masovian Voivodeship, in east-central Poland. Its seat is the town of Mszczonów, which lies approximately 11 kilometres (7 mi) south-east of Żyrardów and 43 km (27 mi) south-west of Warsaw.

The gmina covers an area of 144.87 square kilometres (55.9 sq mi), and as of 2006 its total population is 11,176 (out of which the population of Mszczonów amounts to 6,231, and the population of the rural part of the gmina is 4,945).

== Villages ==
Apart from the town of Mszczonów, Gmina Mszczonów contains the villages and settlements of Adamówek, Adamowice, Badów Górny, Badowo-Dańki, Badowo-Mściska, Bobrowce, Bronisławów, Bronisławów Osuchowski, Budy-Strzyże, Budy-Zasłona, Chudolipie, Ciemno-Gnojna, Czekaj, Dębiny Osuchowskie, Długowizna, Dwórzno, Edwardowo, Gąba, Grabce Józefpolskie, Grabce Wręckie, Grabce-Towarzystwo, Huta Piekarska, Janówek, Kaczków, Kamionka, Kowiesowo, Kowiesy, Lindów, Lublinów, Lutkówka, Lutkówka Druga, Lutkówka-Kolonia, Małachowszczyzna, Marianka, Marków-Świnice, Marków-Towarzystwo, Michalin, Nosy-Poniatki, Nowe Poręby, Nowy Dworek, Olszewek, Olszówka, Osuchów, Osuchów-Kolonia, Pawłowice, Piekarowo, Piekary, Pieńki Osuchowskie, Pieńki-Strzyże, Podlindowo, Pogorzałki, Powązki, Sosnowica, Strzyże, Suszeniec, Świnice, Tłumy, Władysławów, Wólka Wręcka, Wręcza, Wygnanka, Wymysłów, Zbiroża, Zimna Woda and Zimnice.

== Neighbouring gminas ==
Gmina Mszczonów is bordered by the gminas of Biała Rawska, Błędów, Kowiesy, Pniewy, Puszcza Mariańska, Radziejowice and Żabia Wola.
