= Gebar Island =

Uninhabited island in Queensland, Australia

Native name: Gebar
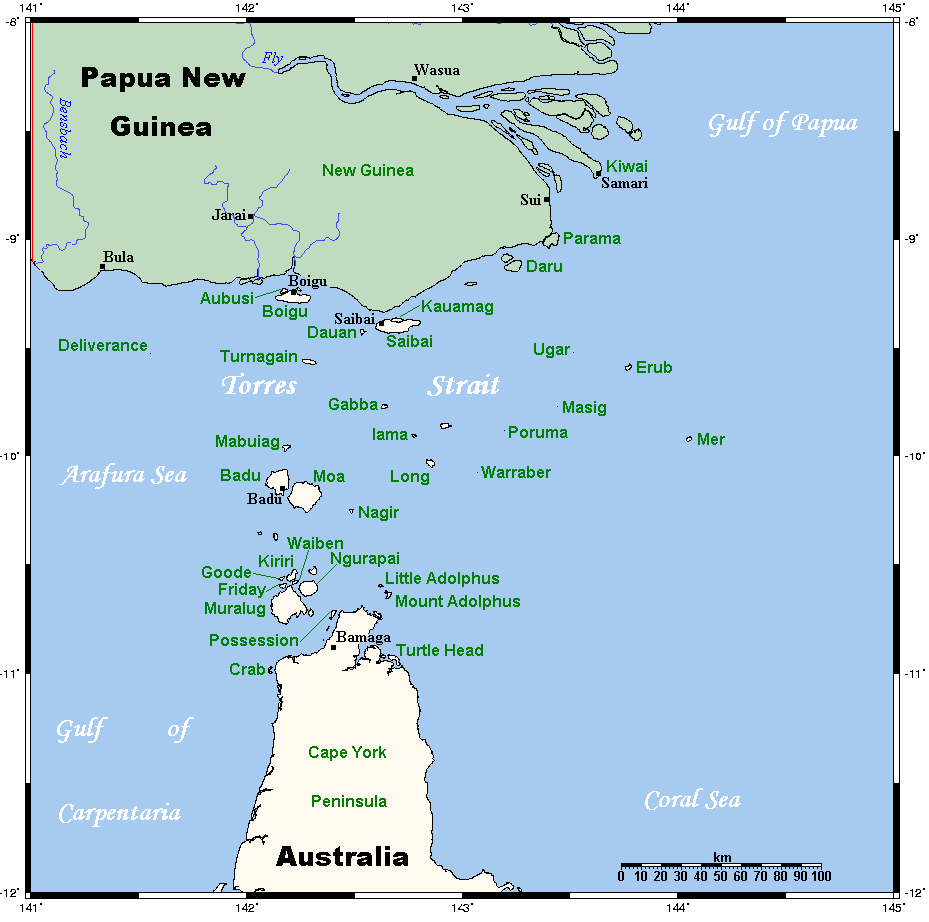
- A map of the Torres Strait Islands showing Gebar Island (Gabba) in the northern central waters of Torres Strait. is about halfway between Australia and Papua New Guinea

Geography
- Location: Northern Australia
- Coordinates: 9°45′54″S 142°37′39″E
- Archipelago: Torres Strait Islands
- Adjacent to: Torres Strait
- Total islands: 2

Administration
- Australia
- State: Queensland

Demographics
- Population: Uninhabited

Additional information
- Time zone: AEST

Gebar (historically also Gabba Island, Brothers Hills or The Brothers) is an uninhabited island in the Torres Strait within the Australian state of Queensland.

== Geography and climate ==
Gebar is a basaltic island rising above surrounding reefs in the central Torres Strait, located approximately 20 km (12 mi) northwest of Yam Island.

The broader region experiences a tropical climate characterised by a pronounced wet season (typically December to March) and a dry season the remainder of the year. Rainfall ranges widely depending on locality, but annual totals commonly lie between 1,000 and 3,000 mm. The area is occasionally affected by tropical cyclones, particularly from November to May.

== History ==
The first recorded European sighting of the island was by the Spanish expedition of Luís Vaez de Torres on 10 September 1606. It was again described by William Bligh on 11 September 1792 as “an island with two hills,” and he gave it the name “The Brothers.” Nineteenth- and early twentieth-century charts variously record the island under the names “Brothers Hills”, “Two Brothers” and the anglicised “Gabba.”

== Ecology ==
The Torres Strait is a globally significant marine environment, home to diverse ecosystems including coral reefs, seagrass beds, mangroves, dugong and sea turtle feeding grounds.

Sea turtles such as green, hawksbill, and flatback turtles and dugongs use the region's seagrass ecosystems extensively. Traditional owners and researchers have conducted satellite tracking and aerial surveys to map their movements and habitat use in the Torres Strait.

Seagrass health plays a pivotal role in this ecosystem. Research by JCU’s TropWATER, in collaboration with Regional Authority programs, has monitored seagrass response to environmental change including seasonal cycles and chronic grazing by megaherbivores such as turtles and dugongs. Coastal and migratory shorebirds also rely on the region for feeding and nesting. Over 50 avian species, many culturally significant to Islander groups are dependent on these islands, such as migratory species like the endangered eastern curlew and curlew sandpiper.

== Cultural and archaeological significance ==
The traditional owners of Gebar are the Gebaralgal people, based on Yam Island. Oral histories and their native title determination affirm a long-standing connection to the island for hunting, gathering, and ceremonial use. On 13 December 2004, the Federal Court of Australia made a consent determination recognising native title over Gebar. In evidence before the Court, elder Dick Peters described continuing visits to Gebar for hunting turtle, collecting turtle eggs, fishing and gathering plant materials.

Archaeologically, while detailed studies on Gebar are lacking, broader Torres Strait research documents deep-seated marine-centered cultural traditions spanning over 7,000 years. Early settlements, ritual sites, and material culture suggests a maritime heritage characterised by sustained resource use, sea-based mobility, and spiritual landscapes across the Strait.

== Climate change impacts ==
The Torres Strait region faces urgent environmental threats. Sea levels are rising at approximately three times the global average, and climate-driven changes such as extreme weather, ocean warming, and ecosystem degradation are already affecting both natural and cultural values. These developments threaten low-lying islands and the broader marine and cultural heritage of the region. While Gebar itself is uninhabited, it forms part of this interconnected milieu where shifting ecosystems and sea-level rise may have tangible consequences for its accessibility and ecological functions.

== Shipwreck ==
On 31 December 1913 the 15-ton ketch Newton was reported lost off Gabba (Gebar) Island.

== See also ==
- Torres Strait Islands
- Yam Island, Queensland
- Native title in Australia
