= Carlo Francesco Gabba =

Italian jurist and professor

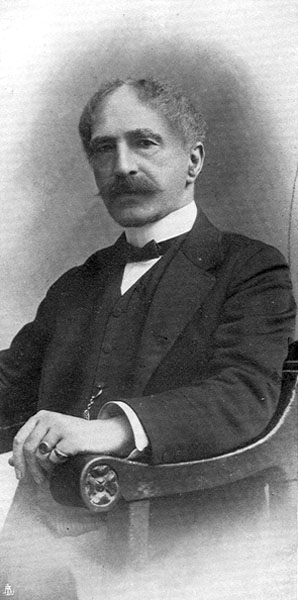
Carlo Francesco Gabba

Carlo Francesco Gabba (April 14, 1835 – February 18, 1920) was an Italian jurist and professor at the University of Pisa who has received several awards and titles. His studies and legal constructions deeply influenced the law in several countries.

== Activities ==
Gabba was born on April 14, 1835, in Lodi. In 1897 he was police of Italian government at the International Congress in Brussels about protection of the industrial property and in 1899 advisor on diplomatic conflicts by the Ministry of Foreign Affairs.

In 1899 he was advisor on diplomatic conflicts to the Italian Ministry of Foreign Affair

Elected senator in 1900, he was an ordinary member of the Standing Committee of the Superior Court of Justice and member of the Turin National Academy of Sciences.

He died on February 18, 1920, in Turin.

== Works on Brazilian law ==
In 1911, while he was an associate professor at the University of Pisa, he defended the name "promise of contract" to refer to prior commitment mutually agreed between the parties that celebrate a contract. This position was reflected immediately in the coming Brazilian Civil Code of 1916 and remained in the review of Brazilian Civil Code in 2002.

Gabba left behind the concept of legal principle acquired right, in his most famous book Teoria della retroattività delle leggi (Theory of retroactive legislation, Turin, 1891). For him, acquired right is "every right that:

1) is consequence of the fact suitable to produce it, under the law of the time in which he was held, although opportunity to assert it was not given prior to the performance of the new law regarding the same fact;
2) under the law under which there was where it originated, came from the outset to integrate the heritage of those who acquired it. "(a originally only patrimonial concept still mainly accepted)."

== Major works ==
- Commemorazione di Maria Gaetana Agnesi. Letta in Milano il 30 dicembre 1899. Florence 1900.
- Della condizione giuridica delle donne. 2nd ed. Turin 1880.
- Di una riforma nella Pia Casa di Carità di Pisa
- I due matrimoni civile e religioso nell’odierno diritto italiano. Lettera all’avv. A. Mosca. Pisa 1876.
- Il divorzio nella legislazione italiana. 4th ed. Milan 1902.
- Intorno ad alcuni più generali problemi della scienza sociale. Conferenze. 1st vol. Turin 1876; 2nd vol. Florence 1881 and 3rd vol. Bologna 1887.
- Intorno ai diritti dell’autore del libretto di un’opera di canto. Considerazioni. Pisa 1891.
- Le donne non avvocate. Considerazioni. Pisa 1884.
- Nuove questioni di diritto civile. 1st vol. Turin 1905; 2nd vol. Turin 1906.
- Questioni di diritto civile. Turin, 1882; 1st vol. 2nd ed. Turin 1909; 2nd vol. Turin 1898.
- Studii di legislazione civile comparata in servizio della nuova codificazione italiana. Milan 1862.
- Teoria della retroattività delle leggi, 3a ed. rev. e ampl.. Turin, 1891–99.
