= Gába =

Gába is a bilingual Sámi magazine that is published six times a year by the Sámi women's forum Sami Nisson Forum, and that has funds earmarked for it in the annual budget of the Sami Parliament of Norway. The magazine was published for the first time on International Women's Day (March 8) in 1996. Although the main languages are Norwegian and Northern Sámi, articles are occasionally written in Southern Sámi, Lule Sámi and Swedish. The articles mainly deal with the everyday life of the Sámi from a woman's perspective.
