= Żyrardów County =

Żyrardów County Powiat żyrardowski
- County
- Flag Coat of arms

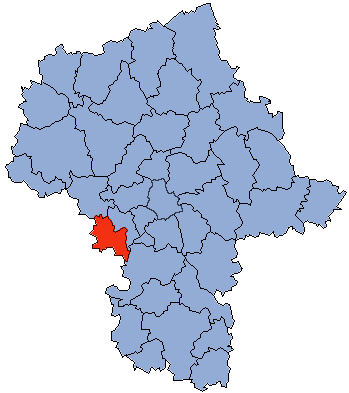
- Location within the voivodeship

- Division into gminas
- Coordinates (Żyrardów): 52°3′N 20°26′E
- Country: Poland
- Voivodeship: Masovian
- Seat: Żyrardów
- Gminas: Total 5 (incl. 1 urban): Żyrardów; Gmina Mszczonów; Gmina Puszcza Mariańska; Gmina Radziejowice; Gmina Wiskitki

Government
  - Starosta: Krzysztof Dziwisz

Area
  - Total: 532.63 km^{2} (205.65 sq mi)

Population (2022)
  - Total: 75,414
  - Density: 141.59/km^{2} (366.71/sq mi)
  - Urban: 46,364
  - Rural: 29,050
- Car plates: WZY
- Website: www.powiat-zyrardowski.pl

Żyrardów County (Polish: powiat żyrardowski) is a unit of territorial administration and local government (powiat) in Masovian Voivodeship, east-central Poland. It came into being on 1 January 1999, as a result of the Polish local government reforms passed in 1998. Its administrative seat and largest town is Żyrardów, which lies 43 kilometres (27 mi) south-west of Warsaw. The only other town in the county is Mszczonów, lying 11 km (7 mi) south-east of Żyrardów.

The county covers an area of 532.63 square kilometres (205.6 sq mi). As of 2022 its total population is 75,414, out of which the population of Żyrardów is 38,784, that of Mszczonów is 6,159, that of Wiskitki is 1,421, and the rural population is 29,050.

== Neighbouring counties ==
Żyrardów County is bordered by Grodzisk County to the east, Grójec County to the south-east, Rawa County to the south, Skierniewice County to the west and Sochaczew County to the north-west.

== Administrative divisions ==
The county is subdivided into five gminas (one urban, two urban-rural and two rural). These are listed in the following table, in descending order of population.

Gmina	Type	Area (km^{2})	Population (2022)	Seat
Żyrardów	urban	14.4	38,784	
Gmina Mszczonów	urban-rural	144.9	11,360	Mszczonów
Gmina Wiskitki	urban-rural	150.9	10,076	Wiskitki
Gmina Puszcza Mariańska	rural	142.4	8,772	Puszcza Mariańska
Gmina Radziejowice	rural	80.1	6,422	Radziejowice
