= Timeline of Iași =

The following is a timeline of the history of the city of Iași, Romania.

== Before the 20th century ==
- 1408 – Iași first mentioned in a document.
- 1513 – Town "burned by the Tatars."
- 1538 – Town sacked by Turks.
- 1541 – Dancu Monastery founded.
- 1562 – Socola Monastery built.
- 1564 – Seat of Moldavian principality relocated to Iași from Suceava by Alexandru Lăpușneanu (approximate date).
- 1628 – Bârnova Monastery built.
- 1639 – Trei Ierarhi Monastery built.
- 1640 – Vasilian College founded.
- 1640s – Printing press in operation.
- 1642 – Synod of Iași
- 1660 – Golia Monastery built.
- 1670 – Great Synagogue built.
- 1686 – Town sacked by Russians.
- 1710 – July: Forces muster near Iași at start of the Russo-Ottoman War of 1710–11.
- 1707 – Princely Academy of Iași founded.
- 1739 – City taken by Russians.
- 1752 – Church of Saint Spiridon built.
- 1755 – Saint Spiridon Hospital established.
- 1769 – City taken by Russians.
- 1792 – 9 January: Treaty of Jassy signed in city, ending Russo-Turkish War (1787–92).
- 1806 – Iași occupied by Russian forces.
- 1813 – First engineering classes at the School of Surveying and Civil Engineers (part of the Princely Academy)
- 1822 – City besieged by Turkish forces.
- 1827 – Fire.
- 1828 – City taken by Russians.
- 1832 – The first theatre, the Théâtre des Variétés (Iași), is inaugurated.
- 1833
  - Physicians and Naturalists Society founded.
  - Roznovanu Palace built.
- 1834
  - Academia Mihăileană founded.
  - Copou Park laid out.
- 1844 – Fire.
- 1846 – Iași National Theatre in the Copou Theatre opens.
- 1855
  - Normal School "Vasile Lupu" Iași established.
  - Yiddish-language Korot Haitim newspaper begins publication.
- 1856 – Iași Botanical Garden established.
- 1859 – City becomes seat of the Romanian United Principalities.
- 1860
  - University of Iași founded.
  - Music and Declamation School and School for Sculpture and Painting founded.
- 1861 – Seat of Romanian government relocated from Iași to Bucharest.
- 1864 – Central State Library of Iași in operation.
- 1870 – Iași railway station opens.
- 1884 – Roman Catholic Diocese of Iași founded.
- 1887 – Metropolitan Cathedral consecrated.
- 1888 – 17 February: Copou Theatre burns down.
- 1896 – Iași National Theatre building constructed.
- 1900
  - Electric Trams in Iași begin operating.
  - Population: 78,067.

== 20th century ==
- 1906 – Toynbee Hall Association founded.
- 1916
  - Capital of Kingdom of Romania relocated to Iași from Bucharest.
  - Moldova History Museum established.
- 1918 – Jassy Conference
- 1918 – Capital of Romania relocated from Iași back to Bucharest.
- 1920 – Tătărași Athenaeum founded.
- 1923 – Iași Exhibition Park opens.
- 1925 – Palace of Justice built.
- 1927 – Union Monument and Attacking Cavalryman Statue unveiled.
- 1937 – Polytechnic Institute established.
- 1941 – 27 June: Iași pogrom of Jews.
- 1943 – Ethnographic Museum of Moldavia established.
- 1944 – 21 August: City taken by Soviet forces.
- 1946 - Gara Socola (railway station) built.
- 1948 - Population: 94,075.
- 1949 – Puppet Theatre opens.
- 1950 – Gara Nicolina (railway station) built.
- 1956 – Romanian National Opera debuts.
- 1957 – Iași Museum of Art moves into the Palace of Culture.
- 1960 – Stadionul Emil Alexandrescu (stadium) opens.
- 1964 – Population: 123,558 city; 157,017 urban agglomeration.
- 1970 – Moldova Mall in business.
- 1977 – Population: 264,947 city; 284,308 urban agglomeration.
- 1992 – Population: 344,425.
- 1995 – Polirom publisher in business.
- 2000 – Iulius Mall Iași in business.

== 21st century ==
- 2002 – Population: 320,888.
- 2010 – CSM Studențesc Iași football club formed.
- 2011 – Population: 290,422.
- 2012 – Palas Iași shopping mall in business.
- 2014 – Iași–Ungheni gas pipeline launched.

== See also ==
- History of Iași
- List of mayors of Iași
- Other names of Iași (e.g. Jashi, Jassy)

== Bibliography ==
- Abraham Rees (1819), "Jassy", The Cyclopaedia, London: Longman, Hurst, Rees, Orme & Brown, hdl:2027/mdp.39015057241161 – via HathiTrust
- "Jassy", Chambers's Encyclopaedia, London: W. & R. Chambers, 1901, hdl:2027/uc2.ark:/13960/t7zk5ms79 – via HathiTrust
- E. Schwarzfeld (1907), "Jassy", Jewish Encyclopedia, vol. 7, New York, hdl:2027/osu.32435029752888
- "Jassy" . Encyclopædia Britannica. Vol. 15 (11th ed.). 1910. p. 279.
- S. Vailhe (1910). "Jassy". Catholic Encyclopedia. New York. hdl:2027/osu.32435024709578.
- Benjamin Vincent (1910), "Jassy", Haydn's Dictionary of Dates (25th ed.), London: Ward, Lock & Co., hdl:2027/loc.ark:/13960/t89g6g776 – via HathiTrust
