= Battle of Humin-Bolimów =

Battle in 1915 during the First World War

Coordinates: 52°04′35″N 20°09′47″E

- Part of the Eastern Front during World War I
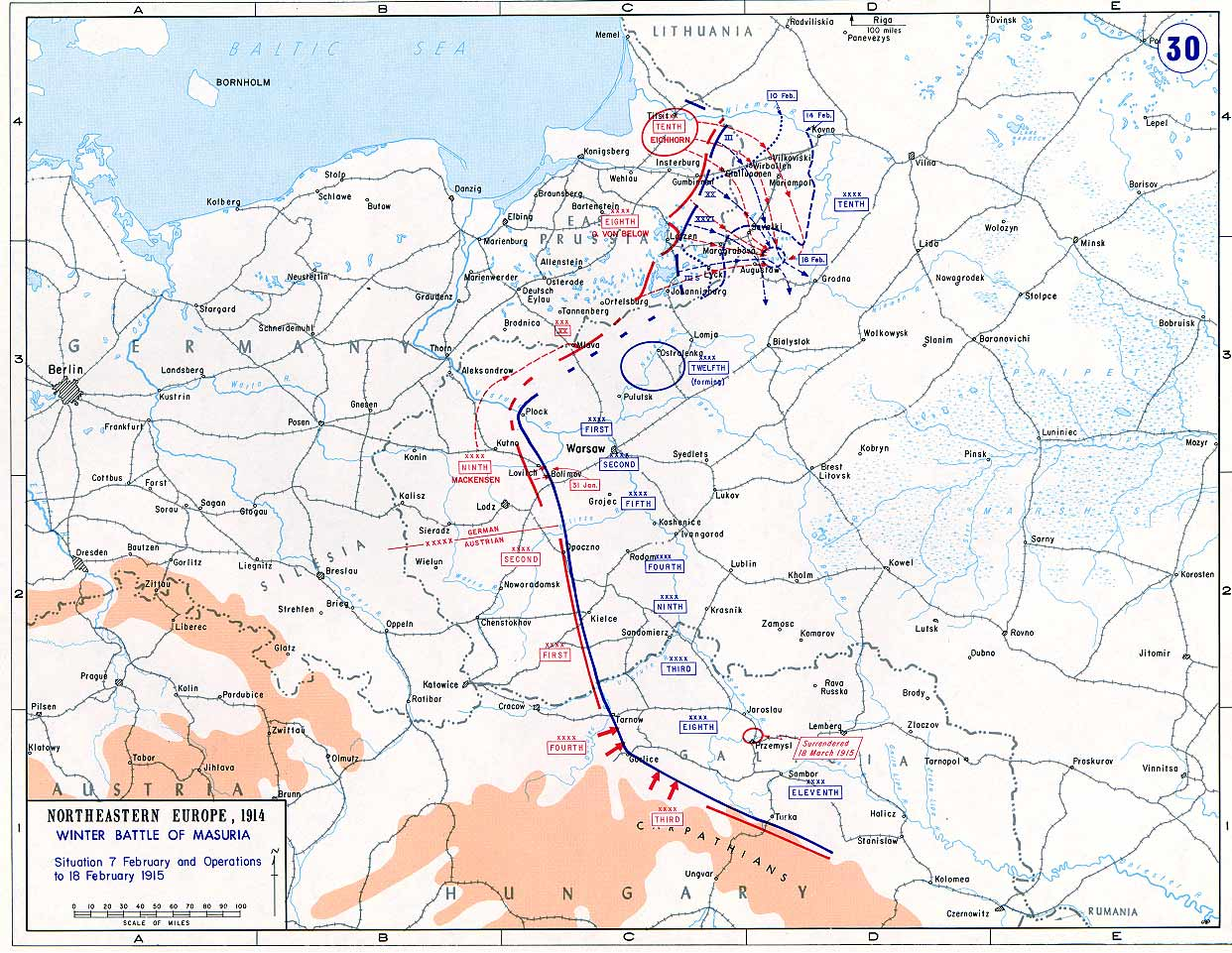
- Eastern Front, 1915.
Date	January 14, 1915 – February 28, 1915
Location	Near Bolimów, Congress Poland, Russian Empire (present-day Poland)
Result	Inconclusive

Belligerents
German Empire	Russian Empire

Commanders and leaders
(German Empire) Paul von Hindenburg (German Empire) Erich Ludendorff (German Empire) August von Mackensen	Vladimir Smirnov; Vasily Gurko; Alexander Litvinov

Units involved
(German Empire) 9th Army	1st Army; 2nd Army; 5th Army

Strength
362,446 men	527,000 men 1,067 machine guns 2,756 guns

Casualties and losses
4,631 KIA; 1,872 MIA; 11,049 WIA; Total 17,552	17,385 KIA; 19,932 MIA; 61,099 WIA; Total 98,416

The Battle of Humin-Bolimów was an inconclusive battle of World War I fought between January 14 and February 28, 1915 between the Imperial German Army and Russia. The battle is considered a preliminary to the Second Battle of the Masurian Lakes.

== Battle ==
January 16, 1915 the German 4th Guards Infantry Division carried out several attacks on the sector of the front south of Bolimów, in the direction of Humin. After a two-hour artillery preparation (at the same time, tear gas shells were used for the first time - 2200 shots), units of the Russian 55th Infantry Division were knocked out of the trenches by a bayonet attack of the four German regiments. The commander of the 2nd Army, Infantry General V. Smirnov, ordered to organize a counterattack with all the forces of the 6th Army Corps, Lieutenant General Vasily Gurko (4th, 16th, 55th Infantry Divisions and a brigade of the 76th Infantry Division - a total of 42,895 men, 68 machine guns, 130 guns). However, until nightfall, the Russian troops failed to recapture the lost trenches near vil. Humin and Dołowatka.

On the night of January 17, the Russian infantry, having made several attacks, took the enemy in pincers and knocked him out of the trenches he had captured the day before. Attempts by the Germans to resume the offensive until the evening were repulsed by machine-gun and artillery fire. The German troops managed to advance only 20 m in two days of stubborn battle; two regiments lost 3 officers and 297 soldiers, in the 14th infantry regiment was killed commander, and his attack failed. The casualties of the Russian side amounted to 725 killed, 101 missing, 3,019 wounded and poisoned.

For a new attack on Humin and Sucha, the commander of the German 9th Army, Colonel General August von Mackensen, concentrated the troops of the reinforced XVII Corps and I Reserve Corps - the 4th, 35th, 36th Infantry and 1st, 36th and 49th Reserve divisions. On the left, the attack was to be supported by the 26th Infantry Division of the XIII Corps, on the right, forces of the group of artillery general Friedrich von Scholtz, the XI and XX Corps. But in connection with the disclosure of the concentration of Russian troops south of Mlawa, Supreme Commander of All German Forces in the East Paul von Hindenburg ordered to strengthen this direction with the forces of the XX Corps (37th and 41st Infantry Divisions), the 1st Guards Reserve Division and the 5th Guards Infantry Brigade.

By January 31, 1915, the German troops concentrated six divisions (up to 40,000 men) and 92 batteries with 596 guns, 150 of them heavy and 2 Austrian 30.5-cm mortars, in the breakthrough area. 18,000 shells filled with tear gas and chlorine were prepared. Russian troops were also reinforced, but the Germans managed to create an overwhelming superiority in artillery. It should also be noted that the tactics of defensive combat on the eve of the war were not developed in any of the armies. Going on the defensive was seen only as a means to wear down the enemy and gather strength for a new offensive. Accordingly, even knowing exactly or approximately about the enemy’s offensive, the Russian command at all levels could only demand from subordinate troops “to hold their positions at all costs”, the creation of fortified zones of great depth was not practiced.

At 8.30 am on January 31, heavy fire was opened on the Russian positions near Humin and Wola Szydłowiecka. Then attacks began, mainly against the 4th and 55th Infantry Divisions. By 16 o'clock the Germans knocked out units of the 4th, 27th and 55th Infantry Divisions from the trenches. At night, a counterattack was prepared by the forces of the detachment of Major General Mikhail Sokovin, but it did not bring success. Vasily Gurko was also transferred the 13th Siberian Rifle Division. The commander of the 2nd Army, V. Smirnov, reported to the commander-in-chief of the armies of the North-Western Front: “According to the reports of the chiefs of the sections, the withdrawal of the battalions of the 13th and 14th regiments is due to the intoxicating effect of gases from enemy shells, from which people suffocated and could not look”.

From 5 o'clock on February 1, Russian troops launched a counterattack, which, despite the introduction of the 59th Infantry and 13th Siberian Rifle Divisions into battle, was unsuccessful. From 9 o'clock the Germans opened heavy artillery and mortar fire of great destructive force, destroyed the advanced trenches and from 16 o'clock resumed the offensive, attacking the left flank of the 98th Yuryevsky Infantry Regiment. By nightfall, most of the German's attacks were repulsed, and new regiments brought into battle stopped his advance. The casualties of the two German corps exceeded 5,200 men, they captured 6,232 Russian prisoners, 7 machine guns, and most importantly - the key points of the first Russian line.

On February 3, the Germans attacked the flank of the sector's Major General P. Zakharov. The 3rd Siberian Rifle Division was sent to reinforce Gurko’s group (he himself fell ill and returned to the corps only on February 6 under the threat of dismissal), and the neighbouring 1st Army of Cavalry General Alexander Litvinov organized a distracting offensive by the forces of the 1st Siberian Army Corps, reinforced by the 14th Siberian Rifle Division and the 3rd Turkestan Rifle Brigade.

By the night of February 4, the position of the Russian 6th Army Corps was partially restored, the village of Wola Szydłowiecka was occupied, but the main strongholds could not be recaptured from the Germans. In the morning, the Germans again went on the offensive, pushing back the 13th Siberian Rifle Division that had arrived. The German 93rd Reserve Infantry Regiment battalion-by-battalion reinforced the brigade of the 4th Infantry Division and dealt a decisive blow to the Siberians. The 4th Siberian Rifle Division of the 2nd Siberian Army Corps and the combined division of Major General N. Karepov from the 4th Army Corps were thrown into battle, but they only managed to stop the onslaught of the Germans. The 93rd German Reserve Infantry Regiment lost 36 killed, 152 wounded and 11 missing and captured 1,556 Russian prisoners.

The actions of the units of the 1st Army on January 21-February 4 were more successful. All corps were involved in the offensive; as a result, at Borzymów and Witkowice, the Germans was pushed back, four machine guns were captured from him (6th Siberian Rifle Regiment). An unexpected blow from the northern flank, which ended in a heavy defeat of the German reserve regiment of Lieutenant Colonel V. Keller, forced the Germans to stop attacks on the 2nd Army, but the 14th Siberian Rifle Division sent to Humin was met by a powerful counterattack of reserves, could not cross the Bzura and suffered large losses. The commander of the 21st Turkestan Rifle Regiment was killed. The 8th German Landwehr Regiment during this counterattack lost seven killed and 14 wounded and captured 325 Russian prisoners.

== Outcome ==
By the end of January, fighting at Dołowatka, Humin, Wola Szydłowiecka, Bolimov and Borzymów drew in almost all formations of the Russian 1st and 2nd Armies. A calmer situation was on the front of the 5th Army, from which separate regiments were also taken to reinforce the attacks on the positions occupied by the Germans. Nevertheless, the build-up of forces on a narrow sector of the front only increased losses without leading to a change in the position of the troops. Directly at Humin, Borzymów and Wola Szydłowiecka Russian troops lost 7,911 killed, 12,248 missing, 20,614 wounded. The commanders of the 18th Siberian Rifle Regiment and the 21st Turkestan Rifle Regiment, Major General S. Moskvin and Colonel A. Selyadtsev, were killed. The German army directly at Humin, Borzymów and Wola Szydłowiecka according to German data, lost about 40,000 men.

The Supreme Commander of All German Forces in the East considers the task of the 9th Army completed, while defining the goal of the battle as pinning down the Russian troops before the decisive offensive in East Prussia. The German troops managed to move forward an insignificant distance, gain a foothold in key strongholds, and chain significant Russian forces to themselves. Over 7,000 prisoners were taken. Arrived February 7 to the front, Emperor Wilhelm II congratulated the troops on their victory and handed out awards.

But the disappointment of the military leaders was also great. “The attacks of the 9th Army east of Rawka brought excellent tactical success, but there was no breakthrough, however, achieved. For the first time used chemical projectiles did not lead to the expected effect. Captured Russians complained of lacrimation, headache, but were not put out of action” the commander of the I Reserve Corps, Lieutenant General C. von Morgen, was stated.

The fighting, without the previous activity and bitterness, continued along the entire front from the mouth of the Bzura to Pilica until the end of February. The German troops failed to break through the Russian positions.

== See also ==
- Friendly fire incidents of World War I
- Second Battle of the Masurian Lakes
- Second Battle of Bolimów

== Additional Reading ==
- Oleynikov, Alexei (2023). Германский натиск на Восток 1915 [The German push to the East 1915] (in Russian). ISBN 978-5-4484-4327-5.
- Airapetov, Oleg (2014). "Разгром 10-й армии и гибель 20-го корпуса" [The defeat of the 10th Army and the death of the 20th Corps]. Участие Российской империи в Первой Мировой Войне: 1915 [Participation of the Russian Empire in the First World War: 1915] (in Russian). Moscow: Кучуково поле. ISBN 978-5-9950-0420-2.
- Бои на Бзуре и Равке (ноябрь 1914 – январь 1915 года). Перлюстрированные письма, воспоминания, фронтовые корреспонденции / сост., перевод, автор коммент. и предисловия Н.Д. Постников. – М.: ИИУ МГОУ, 2018 – 238 с.
- Постников Н.Д. Битва на Равке (январь 1915 г.): управление войсками командованием VI-го армейского корпуса в условиях оборонительного боя // Ключевские чтения – 2014. Россия и русский мир перед лицом глобальных угроз: Материалы Всероссийской научной конференции: Сборник научных трудов. М.: «Спутник +», 2015. С. 217–222.
- Постников Н.Д. «Великая битва на Равке» в январе 1915 года: взгляд с немецкой стороны // Международная жизнь. Специальный выпуск. История без купюр. Великая война. Начало. 2014. С. 144–159.
- Постников Н.Д. Воспоминания русских офицеров и фронтовые письма о сражении под Волей Шидловской и Гуминым 18–23 января 1915 года как исторический источник // Первая мировая война и историческая память. Материалы Декабрьских научных чтений, состоявшихся 18 декабря 2014 г. М., 2015. С. 293–307.
- Постников Н.Д. Забытые станицы Великой войны: Равка, сражение за Гумин и Волю Шидловскую (январь 1915 г.) // Россия в годы Первой мировой войны, 1914–1918: материалы Междунар. науч. конф. (Москва, 30 сентября – 3 октября 2014 г.). /отв. ред.: А.Н. Артизов, А.К. Левыкин, Ю.А. Петров; Ин-т рос. истории Рос. акад. наук; Гос. ист. музей; Федеральное арх. агентство; Рос. ист. о-во. – М.: [ИРИ РАН], 2014. 712 с.: ил., 16 л. ил. С. 667–671.
- Постников Н.Д. Первая газовая атака на русско-германском фронте в январе 1915 года // Преподавание истории в школе. 2017. No.3. С. 27–31.
- Постников Н.Д. Последний бой Юрьевского полка // Великая война: сто лет. М., СПб.: Нестор-История. 2014. С. 87–108. https://histrf.ru/uploads/media/default/0001/07/2dacf59d881aec5bee5f84d2f5b462c412e5e2f0.pdf
- Постников Н.Д. «Те, кто был в эти дни под Гуминым, вряд ли забудет их». Русские офицеры 97-го Лифляндского и 98-го Юрьевского полков о сражении 18–31 января 1915 г. // Исторический архив. 2014. No.3. С. 40–62.
- Постников Н.Д. Убитые на Равке. 2-е изд., испр. и доп. М.: ИИУ МГОУ, 2018. – 296 с.
- Постников Н.Д. «Куда ни взгляни всюду носится призрак смерти». Бои на Бзуре и Равке в фронтовых письмах (декабрь 1914-январь 1915) // Международная жизнь. No.8. Август. 2015. С. 167–185.
- Постников Н.Д. Фронтовые письма как исторический источник Первой мировой войны. На примере боев на реке Равке в январе 1915 г. // Преподавание истории в школе. 2016. No.5. С. 25–30.
- Постников Н.Д. «Этот бой напоминал Бородинское сражение». Бои на Равке в письмах с фронта (декабрь 1914 – январь 1915) // Вестник Московского государственного областного университета. Серия «История и политические науки». 2014. No.4. С. 8-19.https://vestnik-mgou.ru/Articles/View/7737
- Kaliński, Stanisław Ataki gazowe w bitwie pozycyjnej 9 Armii Niemieckiej nad Rawką i Bzurą 1914–1915. Przemyśl. 2010.
- Duffy, Michael (2005-12-22). "The Battle of Bolimov, 1915". First World War.com. Archived from the original on 3 September 2006.
- Smith, Gordon (December 2000). "Military Campaigns of World War 1—Russia". Naval-History.net. Archived from the original on 2006-08-13.
