= Gurko =

Gurko is a surname. Notable people with the surname include:

- Iosif Gurko (1828–1901), Russian field marshal
- Leo Gurko (1914–2008), Polish-American author
- Vasily Gurko (1864–1937), Russian army officer
- Vladimir Gurko (1862–1927), Russian government official
