= Bolimów =

- Town
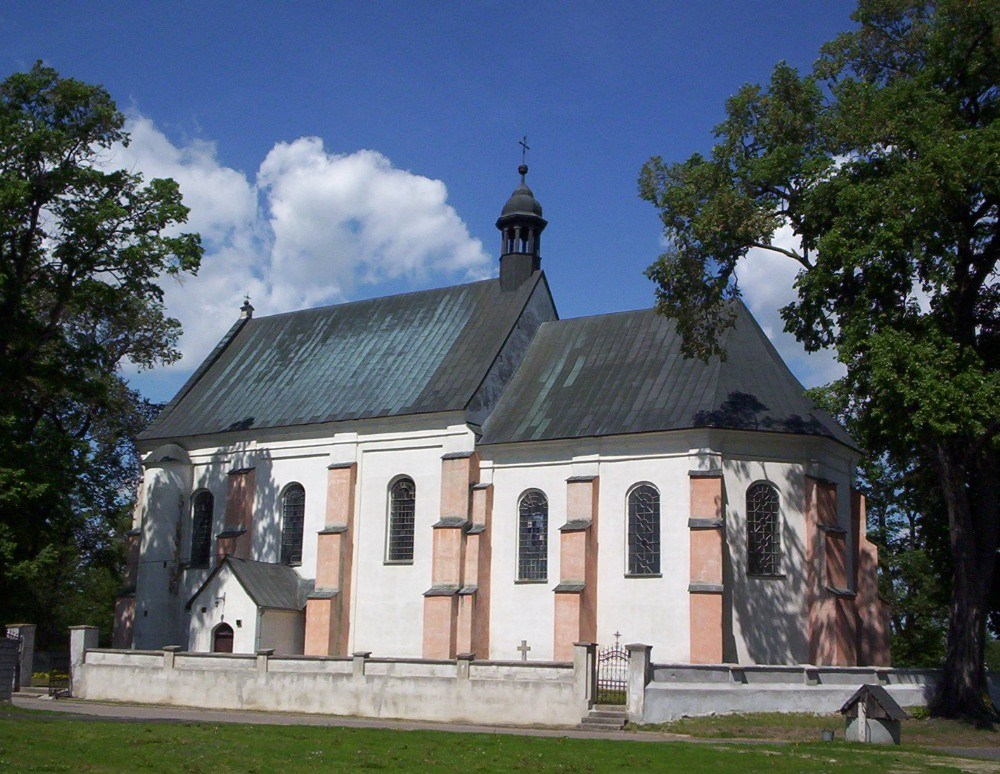
- Renaissance Holy Trinity church in Bolimów

- Flag Coat of arms

- Location within Poland
- Coordinates: 52°4′35″N 20°9′47″E
- Country: Poland
- Voivodeship: Łódź
- County: Skierniewice
- Gmina: Bolimów
- Population: 930
- Time zone: UTC+1 (CET)
  - Summer (DST): UTC+2 (CEST)
- Vehicle registration: ESK
- Website: http://www.bolimow.pl

Bolimów [bɔˈlimuf] is a town in Skierniewice County, Łódź Voivodeship, in central Poland. It is the seat of the Gmina (administrative district) called Gmina Bolimów. It lies approximately 14 km (9 mi) north of Skierniewice and 58 km (36 mi) north-east of the regional capital Łódź. The town has a population of 930. It gives its name to the protected area known as Bolimów Landscape Park.

== History ==
Its history dates back to at least 1370, when it was already considered a town. It was a royal town of Poland, administratively located in the Sochaczew County in the Rawa Voivodeship in the Greater Poland Province. Since 1815, it was located in the Russian Partition of Poland. Around 1870, it was one of many towns deprived of its town rights by the Russians as a punishment for the Polish January Uprising.

It was the place where gas weapons were used for the first time, during First World War, when on 31 January 1915, during the Battle of Bolimów, the German Army shelled Russian army positions with xylyl bromide, a tear gas; the attack was relatively unsuccessful due to low temperature which prevented the gas from vaporising and spreading. A much larger attack with poison gas occurred in the nearby area on 31 May 1915, and Russian army suffered much higher casualties (over several thousand dead).

After the war, in 1918, Poland regained independence and control of the settlement.

Following the joint German-Soviet invasion of Poland, which started World War II in September 1939, it was occupied by Germany until 1945. In 1944, during and after the Warsaw Uprising, the Germans deported several hundreds of Poles (mainly old people and women with children) from the Dulag 121 camp in Pruszków, where they were initially imprisoned, to Bolimów and surrounding villages.
