= Sierzchów =

Sierzchów may refer to the following places:

- Sierzchów, Greater Poland Voivodeship (west-central Poland)
- Sierzchów, Łódź Voivodeship (central Poland)
- Sierzchów, Masovian Voivodeship (east-central Poland)
