= Wólka Łasiecka =

- Village
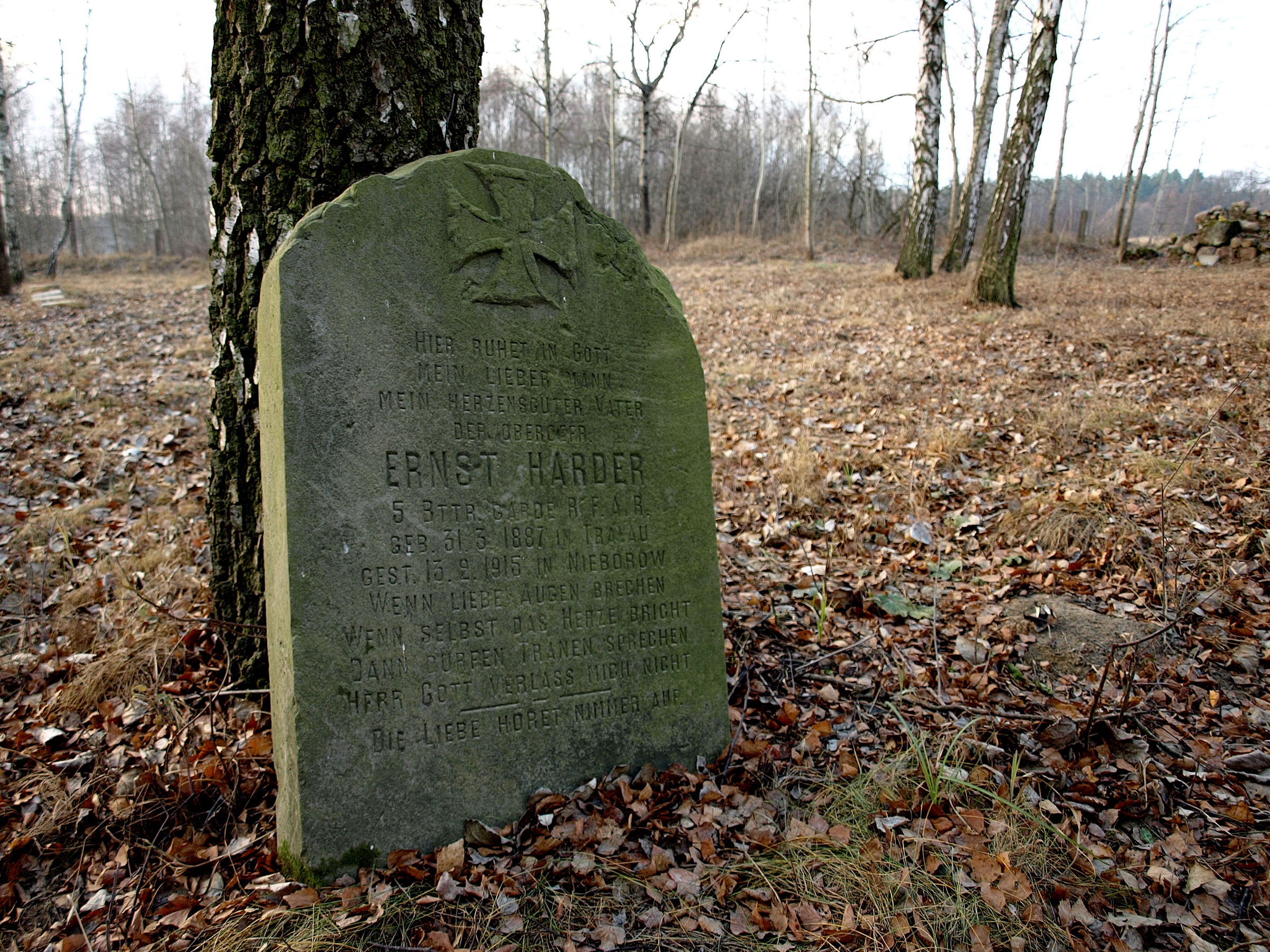
- War cemetery

- Location within Poland
- Coordinates: 52°4′N 20°9′E
- Country: Poland
- Voivodeship: Łódź
- County: Skierniewice
- Gmina: Bolimów

Wólka Łasiecka [ˈvulka waˈɕɛt͡ska] is a village in the administrative district of Gmina Bolimów, within Skierniewice County, Łódź Voivodeship, in central Poland.
