= Joachimów-Mogiły =

- Village
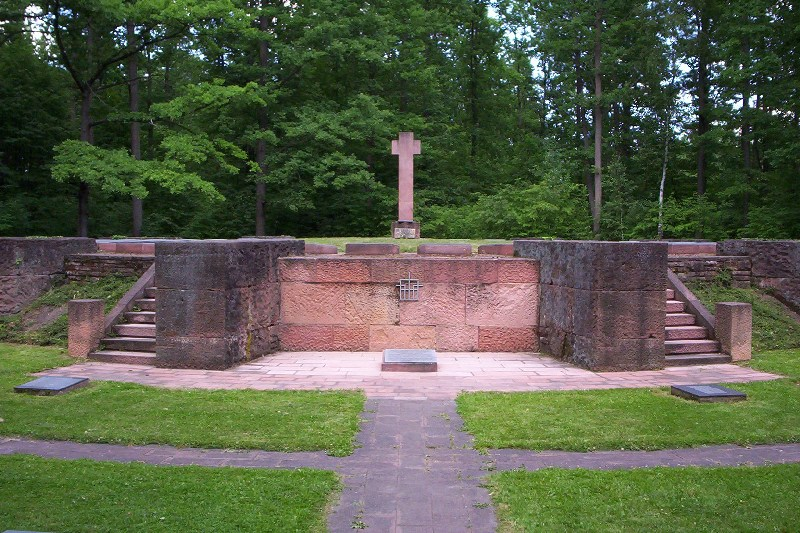
- Cemetery

- Location within Poland
- Coordinates: 52°3′28″N 20°12′9″E
- Country: Poland
- Voivodeship: Łódź
- County: Skierniewice
- Gmina: Bolimów

Joachimów-Mogiły [jɔaˈximuf mɔˈɡiwɨ] is a village in the administrative district of Gmina Bolimów, within Skierniewice County, Łódź Voivodeship, in central Poland.
