= Sokołów, Skierniewice County =

Sokołów
- Village
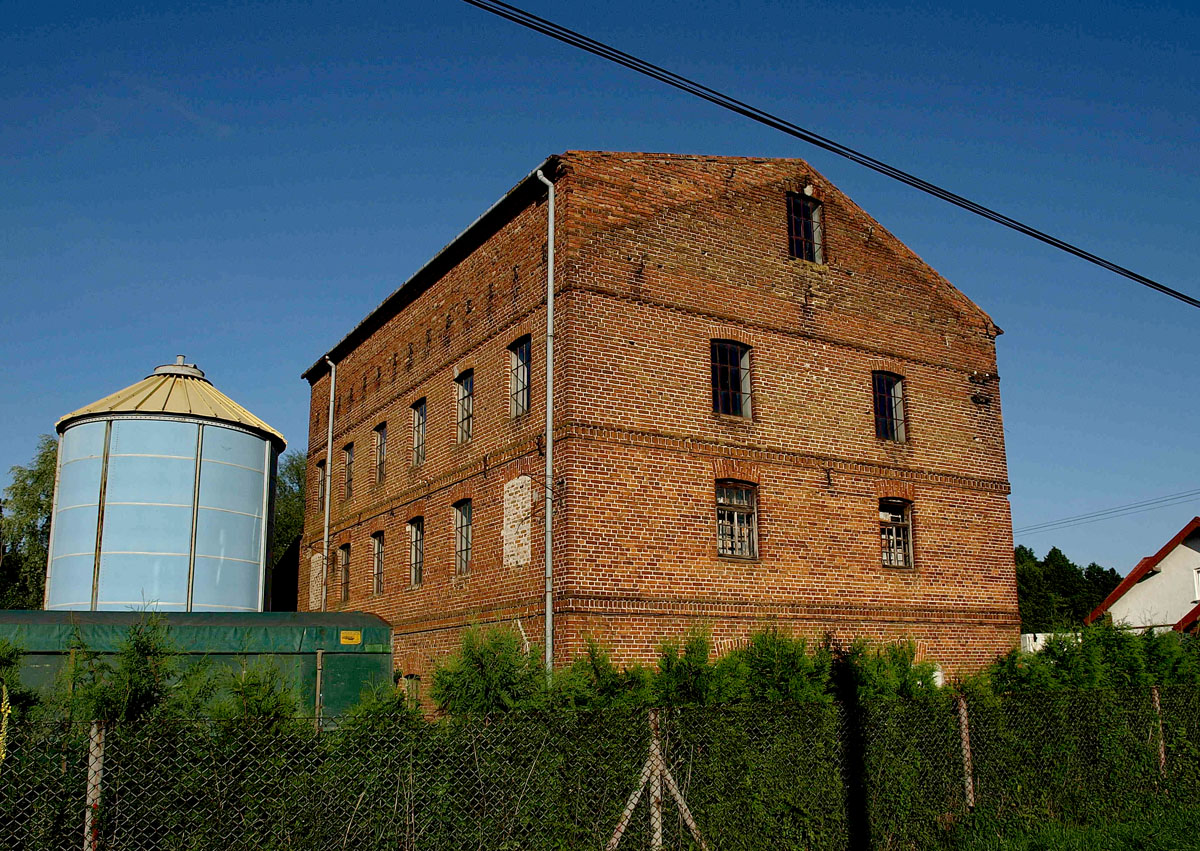

- Location within Poland
- Coordinates: 52°6′N 20°9′E
- Country: Poland
- Voivodeship: Łódź
- County: Skierniewice
- Gmina: Bolimów

Sokołów [sɔˈkɔwuf] is a village in the administrative district of Gmina Bolimów, within Skierniewice County, Łódź Voivodeship, in central Poland.
