= Gmina Bolimów =

Gmina Bolimów Bolimów Commune
- Gmina

- Flag Coat of arms
- Interactive map of Gmina Bolimów
- Coordinates (Bolimów): 52°4′35″N 20°9′47″E
- Country: Poland
- Voivodeship: Łódź
- County: Skierniewice County
- Seat: Bolimów

Area
  - Total: 112.21 km^{2} (43.32 sq mi)

Population (2021)
  - Total: 3,909
  - Density: 34.84/km^{2} (90.23/sq mi)
- Time zone: UTC+1 (CET)
  - Summer (DST): UTC+2 (CEST)
- Website: www.bolimow.pl

Gmina Bolimów is a rural gmina (administrative district) in Skierniewice County, Łódź Voivodeship, in central Poland. Its seat is the village of Bolimów, which lies approximately 14 kilometres (9 mi) north of Skierniewice and 58 km (36 mi) north-east of the regional capital Łódź.

The gmina covers an area of 112.21 square kilometres (43.3 sq mi), and as of 2006, its total population was 4,026.

The gmina contains part of the protected area called Bolimów Landscape Park.

== Villages ==
Gmina Bolimów contains the villages and settlements of:

- Bolimów
- Bolimowska Wieś
- Humin
- Humin-Dobra Ziemskie
- Jasionna
- Joachimów-Mogiły
- Józefów
- Kęszyce-Wieś
- Kolonia Bolimowska-Wieś
- Kolonia Wola Szydłowiecka
- Kurabka
- Łasieczniki
- Nowe Kęszyce
- Podsokołów
- Sierzchów
- Sokołów
- Wola Szydłowiecka
- Wólka Łasiecka
- Ziąbki
- Ziemiary

== Neighbouring gminas ==
Gmina Bolimów is bordered by the gminas of Nieborów, Nowa Sucha, Puszcza Mariańska, Skierniewice and Wiskitki.
