= Józefów, Skierniewice County =

Józefów
- Village
- Location within Poland
- Coordinates: 52°6′4″N 20°15′34″E
- Country: Poland
- Voivodeship: Łódź
- County: Skierniewice
- Gmina: Bolimów

Józefów (Polish pronunciation: [juˈzɛfuf]) is a village in the administrative district of Gmina Bolimów, within Skierniewice County, Łódź Voivodeship, in central Poland.
