= Humin-Dobra Ziemskie =

- Village
- Location within Poland
- Coordinates: 52°6′32″N 20°11′40″E
- Country: Poland
- Voivodeship: Łódź
- County: Skierniewice
- Gmina: Bolimów

Humin-Dobra Ziemskie [ˈxumin ˈdɔbra ˈʑɛmskʲɛ] is a village in the administrative district of Gmina Bolimów, within Skierniewice County, Łódź Voivodeship, in central Poland.
