= Kęszyce-Wieś =

- Village
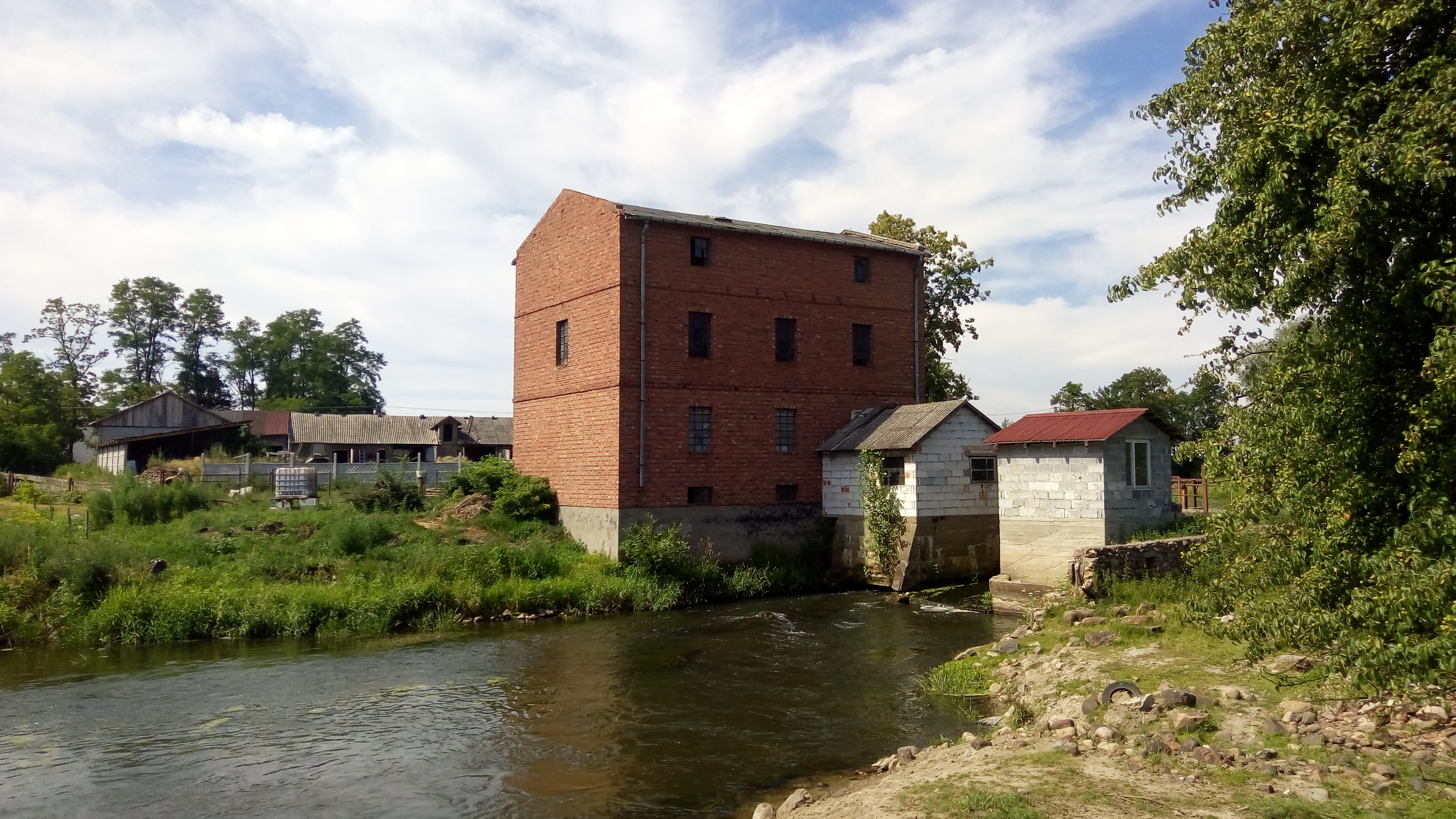

- Location within Poland
- Coordinates: 52°8′26″N 20°8′49″E
- Country: Poland
- Voivodeship: Łódź
- County: Skierniewice
- Gmina: Bolimów

Kęszyce-Wieś [kɛ̃ˈʂɨt͡sɛ ˈvjɛɕ] is a village in the administrative district of Gmina Bolimów, within Skierniewice County, Łódź Voivodeship, in central Poland.
