= Jasionna, Skierniewice County =

Jasionna
- Village
- Location within Poland
- Coordinates: 52°7′0″N 20°8′24″E
- Country: Poland
- Voivodeship: Łódź
- County: Skierniewice
- Gmina: Bolimów

Jasionna [jaˈɕɔnna] is a village in the administrative district of Gmina Bolimów, within Skierniewice County, Łódź Voivodeship, in central Poland.
