= Kolonia Wola Szydłowiecka =

- Village
- Location within Poland
- Coordinates: 52°5′44″N 20°14′21″E
- Country: Poland
- Voivodeship: Łódź
- County: Skierniewice
- Gmina: Bolimów

Kolonia Wola Szydłowiecka [kɔˈlɔɲa ˈvɔla ʂɨdwɔˈvjɛt͡ska] is a village in the administrative district of Gmina Bolimów, within Skierniewice County, Łódź Voivodeship, in central Poland.
