= Bolimowska Wieś =

- Village
- Location within Poland
- Coordinates: 52°5′N 20°10′E
- Country: Poland
- Voivodeship: Łódź
- County: Skierniewice
- Gmina: Bolimów

Bolimowska Wieś [bɔliˈmɔfska ˈvjɛɕ] is a village in the administrative district of Gmina Bolimów, within Skierniewice County, Łódź Voivodeship, in central Poland.
