= Théâtre des Variétés (Iași) =

Théâtre des Variétés was a theatre in Iași in Romania, founded in 1832 and closed in 1869. It was the first permanent public theatre in Iași and in all the Romanian Old Kingdom.

Theatre was very popular and successful in Iași. Theatre plays were arranged by amateur theatre societies among the aristocracy in the early 19th century. A theatre building was built for a professional theatre company active in the city, managed by the brothers Baptiste and Joseph Foureaux, and inaugurated on 4 December 1832. The theatre building was shared with other theatre companies performing in the city. In 1840, the Iași National Theatre was founded and from 1846 housed in the Copou Theatre. The Théâtre des Variétés burned down in 1869.

== See also ==
- Old theatre of Arad
