= Podsokołów =

- Village
- Location within Poland
- Coordinates: 52°5′29″N 20°9′19″E
- Country: Poland
- Voivodeship: Łódź
- County: Skierniewice
- Gmina: Bolimów

Podsokołów [pɔtsɔˈkɔwuf] is a village in the administrative district of Gmina Bolimów, within Skierniewice County, Łódź Voivodeship, in central Poland.
