= Kurabka =

- Village
- Location within Poland
- Coordinates: 52°7′50″N 20°9′45″E
- Country: Poland
- Voivodeship: Łódź
- County: Skierniewice
- Gmina: Bolimów

Kurabka [kuˈrapka] is a village situated in the administrative district of Gmina Bolimów, within Skierniewice County, Łódź Voivodeship, in central Poland.
