= Nowe Kęszyce =

- Village
- Location within Poland
- Coordinates: 52°8′44″N 20°8′49″E
- Country: Poland
- Voivodeship: Łódź
- County: Skierniewice
- Gmina: Bolimów

Nowe Kęszyce [ˈnɔvɛ kɛ̃ˈʂɨt͡sɛ] is a village in the administrative district of Gmina Bolimów, within Skierniewice County, Łódź Voivodeship, in central Poland.
