= Kolonia Bolimowska-Wieś =

- Village
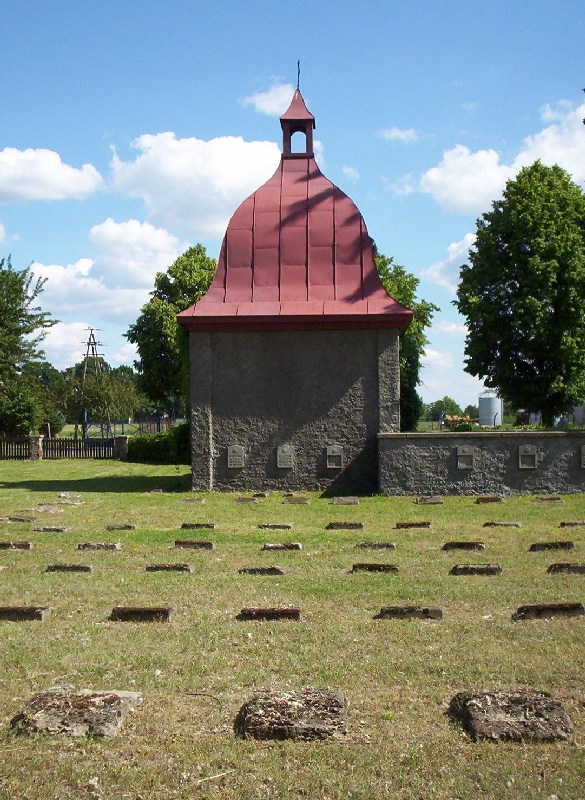
- Cemetery

- Location within Poland
- Coordinates: 52°5′N 20°10′E
- Country: Poland
- Voivodeship: Łódź
- County: Skierniewice
- Gmina: Bolimów

Kolonia Bolimowska-Wieś [kɔˈlɔɲa bɔliˈmɔfska ˈvjɛɕ] is a village in the administrative district of Gmina Bolimów, within Skierniewice County, Łódź Voivodeship, in central Poland.
