= Vasily Gurko =

Imperial Russian Army general (1864–1937)

Vasily Iosifovich Gurko
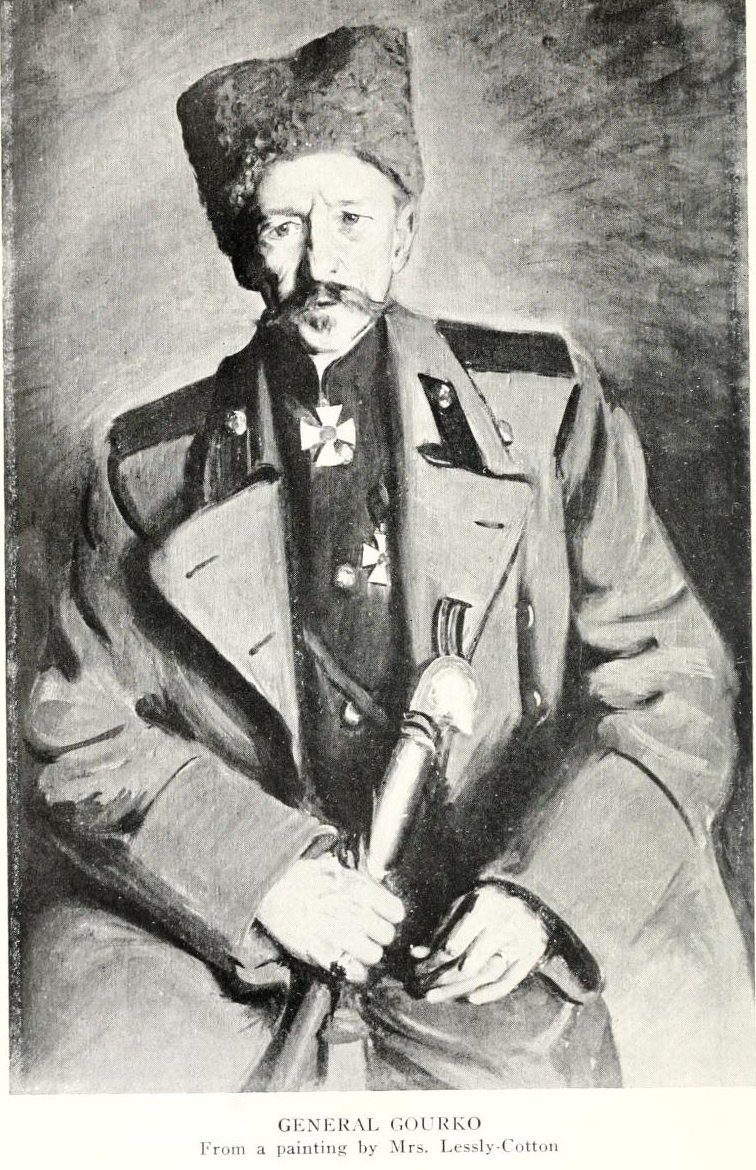
- Born: May 20, 1864; Tsarskoye Selo, Saint Petersburg, Russian Empire
- Died: February 11, 1937 (aged 72); Rome, Kingdom of Italy
- Relatives: Iosif Gurko (father); Vladimir Gurko (brother)
- Military career
- Allegiance: Russian Empire
- Branch: Imperial Russian Army
- Rank: General
- Commands: 5th Army
- Conflicts: Second Boer War; Russo-Japanese War; World War I; Battle of Bolimov; Lake Naroch offensive

Vasily Iosifovich Romeyko-Gurko (Russian: Васи́лий Ио́сифович Роме́йко-Гу́рко; 20 May 1864 in Tsarskoye Selo – 11 February 1937) served for a brief period as a Chief-of-Staff of the Imperial Russian Army before being forced out of the country in exile following the October Revolution of 1917.

== Biography ==
Gurko was the son of Iosif Gurko and brother of Vladimir Gurko. He graduated from the Page Corps, an elite school for the children of Russian nobility in 1885 and from the General Staff Academy in 1892. He served as a military attaché to the Transvaal Republic and rode with the Boer Army in the Second Boer War. He was a military attaché to Berlin in 1901. During the Russo-Japanese War of 1904 to 1906, he initially held an assignment at the office of the Quartermaster-General of the Manchurian Army, but later commanded a Cossack brigade. After the end of the war, from 1906 to 1910, he served as chairman of a commission to investigate the reasons for the failure of Russian forces in that conflict.

In 1911, Gurko was appointed to command of the 1st Cavalry Division under Paul von Rennenkampf. With the outbreak of World War I, he led the division in East Prussia and at Battle of Lodz in November 1914 before receiving an appointment as Chief of Staff to Mikhail Alexeev. He was assigned command of the Sixth Army Corps, attached to Second Army, from 1915 to 1916. Gurko led the Russian counterattack in the January 1915 at the Battle of Bolimov.

Gurko commanded the Fifth Army during the Lake Naroch offensive.

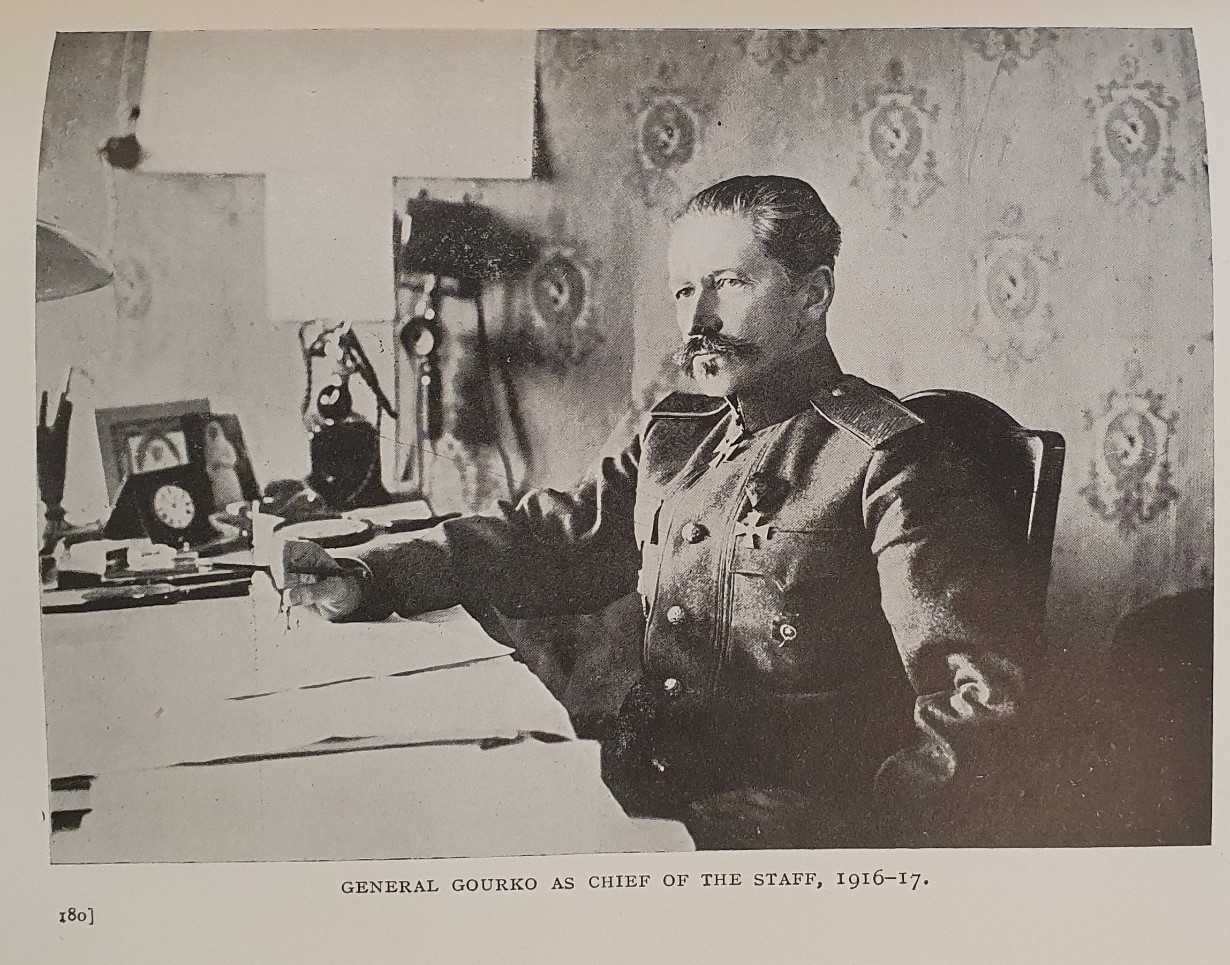
General Gurko as chief of the staff, 1916-1917.

Subsequently, Gurko commanded the 5th Special Army on the Southwestern Front from August 1916. In October 1916, he replaced Alexeev as chief-of-staff and from March 1917 became commander of the Western Front. However, he was relieved of his command only two months later by the Russian Provisional Government for expressing support of the monarchy. He was imprisoned at Peter and Paul Fortress for two months, and then exiled in September 1917 to the United Kingdom. He later settled in Italy and participated in the anti-Soviet Russian All-Military Union. He refused an offer to command White movement forces in northern Russia in 1919. After his death in 1937, he was buried at the Protestant Cemetery, Rome.

== Honours and awards ==
- Order of St. Stanislaus 3rd class (1894); 2nd class with swords (1905); 1st class (1908)
- Order of St. Anna, 3rd class (1896); 2nd class with swords (1905)
- Order of St. Vladimir, 4th class (1901); 3rd class (1905)
- Gold Sword for Bravery (1905)
- Order of St. George, 4th class (1914); 3rd class (1915)

== Writings ==
- War and Revolution in Russia, 1914-1917, Macmillan, 1919.
