= Old theatre of Arad =

The Old Theatre of Arad (Romanian: Teatrul vechi din Arad) or Hirschl Theatre is a building declared a historical monument located on Gheorghe Lazăr Street, in Arad municipality and is the first permanent theatre building in Romania, built in 1817.

== Description ==
The building, built in Baroque style and erected in 1816-1817, at the initiative of the Viennese merchant Iacob Hirschl, is considered the oldest permanent theatre building in the country. The main façade has largely retained its previous appearance; the most remarkable elements are the three gates that line the ground floor.

The façade is beautifully decorated by some semi-buried pilasters, provided with floral ornaments.

On the stage of this theatre, remarkable performances in Hungarian, Romanian and German have taken place.

In the autumn of 1817, in November, a German theatre troupe led by Cristofor Kun performed here.

The first major event of the theatre, immediately after the inauguration, was the presentation on the Thalia stage, on February 27, 1818, of a performance in Romanian, by the students of the Preparandiei from Arad, an event which is among the first Romanian theatrical performances in the country. Among the troupes that took to the stage we should also mention those of Mihai Pascaly and Matei Millo, who came from Bucharest. On one such occasion, Mihai Eminescu participated as a prompter in a performance given by Mihai Pascaly's troupe in 1868. Far from being an isolated cultural act, the performances were continued in the following years. The existence of a permanent building, over the years, brought to the stage of the performance hall numerous prestigious troupes and a number of artists, such as Treuman in 1845, or Johan Strauss son in the concert of 1847.

The theatre, as an institution, operated in an edifice consisting of two buildings, the Hirschl House and the Old Theatre.

In 1907 the building was converted into the Urania Cinema, being among the first in the country. On 16 April 1913, the first Romanian film was shown here: "The War of Independence", a film that had premiered on 1 September 1912, in Bucharest, in the hall „Eforie”.

The building, which was in an advanced state of decay, was returned to the descendants of the former owner Iacob Hirschl. Arad City Hall wants to buy the building of the first permanent theatre in Romania and restore it. The current owners have said they agree to give up the old theatre building for a sum of money.

== Bibliography ==
- Eugen Gluck/Alexandru Roz; Arad City Guide; 1982
