= Moldova Center =

- Interactive map of the Moldova Center area
- Former names: Magazin Universal Moldova; Moldova Mall

General information
- Status: Completed
- Type: Mixed use
- Location: 1 Palat Street, Iași, Romania
- Coordinates: 47.160259°N 27.587549°E
- Completed: 1970
- Renovated: 2006 and 2015

Technical details
- Floor count: 7
- Floor area: 17,000 m^{2} (180,000 sq ft)

Moldova Center is a mixed-use building located in the Civic Centre district of Iași, Romania. It was originally opened in 1970 under communist rule as a department store but eventually became a shopping centre and offices.

== History ==
Originally known as Magazin Universal Moldova, it was opened in 1970 as the largest department store in the Moldavia region (with an area of 8,500 square meters). It is located in the centre of Iasi, by the City Hall and St Nicholas' Cathedral. It would sell clothing and food in a standard communist shop. It was originally owned and run by Dănuț Prisecariu, however due to poor investments, he liquidated his companies and moved to Canada. In 2006, Magazin Universal Moldova was enlarged and renamed Moldova Mall. With 9,561 m^{2} (102,910 sq ft) gross leasable area (GLA), the complex had 80 stores, 3 cinema screens, and 14 fast-food and formal restaurants.

In 2011, it was sold to Georg Telemann alongside the nearby Vitansis shopping centre for a token €5, plus €20 million worth of loans. In 2014–2015, under Telemann's new ownership, the building was reconverted into a mixed-use property (with a total leasable area of over 16,900 square meters), with a compact shopping area covering the ground floor (supermarket, bank, confectionery and various services), and 14,600 square metres (157,153 sq ft) of class A offices on the floors 2 to 7. The renovation project cost €10 million. It was aimed to be constructed and run using environmentally friendly materials and renewable energy.
