= Sierzchów, Łódź Voivodeship =

Sierzchów
- Village
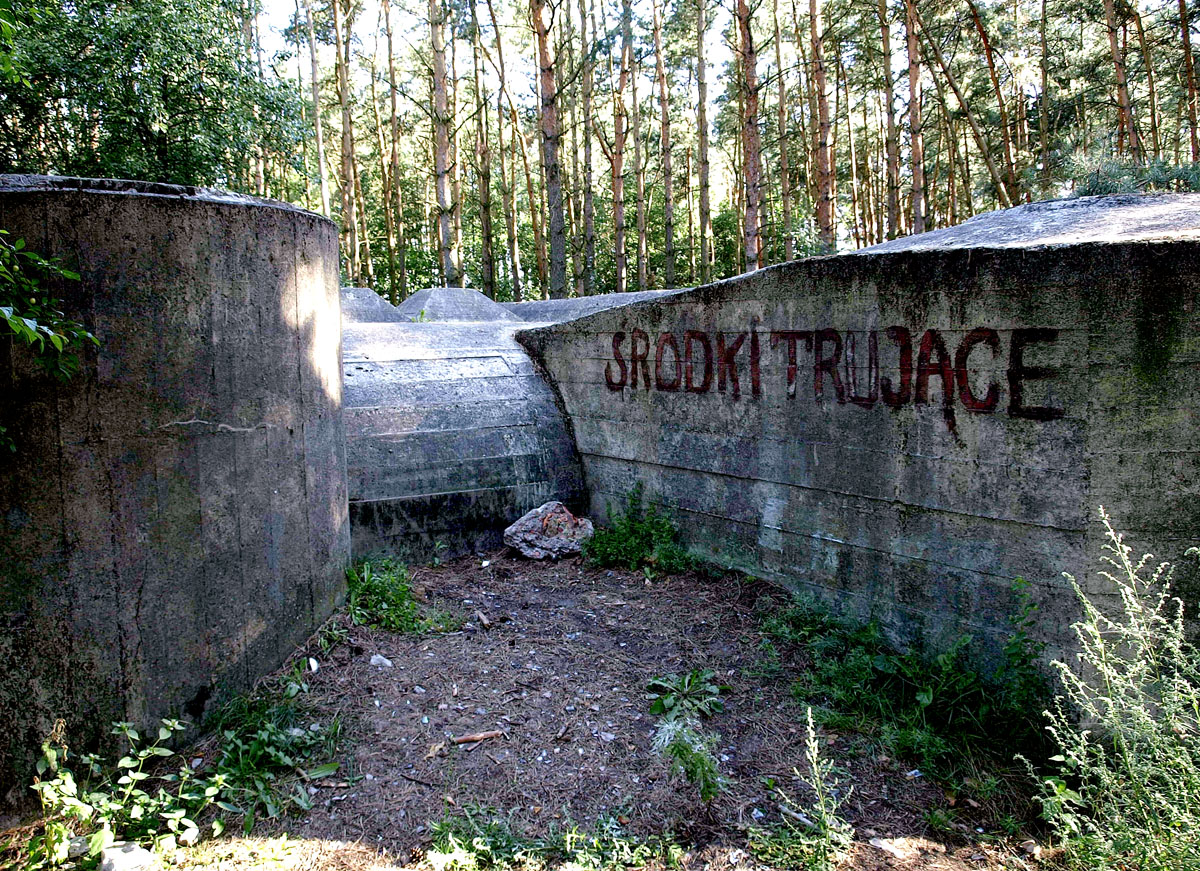
- Bunker

- Location within Poland
- Coordinates: 52°7′N 20°7′E
- Country: Poland
- Voivodeship: Łódź
- County: Skierniewice
- Gmina: Bolimów

Sierzchów [ˈɕɛʂxuf] is a village in the administrative district of Gmina Bolimów, within Skierniewice County, Łódź Voivodeship, in central Poland.
