= Jassy Conference =

1918 White Russian political conference

The Jassy Conference (Russian: Ясское совещание) was a gathering of anti-Bolshevik political figures that met in Iași (then usually referred to in English as Jassy), the temporary capital of Romania at the time, from November 16 through December 6, 1918. The conference was organized by Emile Henno from the French consulate in Kiev. The objective was to coordinate the anti-Bolshevik movements of Southern Russia in order to facilitate dealings with the Allied powers. The twenty-one delegates could not reconcile their differences, despite the need to be unified before the Allies in requesting aid. The conference did nothing to forward any agreements. The Jassy Conference, however, did agree on two points: the desirability of Allied intervention in the civil war and the indivisibility of Russia. In a vote, no candidate for future ruler of Russia could even garner half the votes – General Denikin had the most with nine.

The Volunteer Army was represented by Vasily Shulgin and Aleksei Grishin-Almazov. The State Unity Council of Russia was represented by Vladimir Gurko and Nikolai Shebeko. Also present were representative of the National Center, made up of Kadets, and the leftist Union for Regeneration from Kiev.

== See also ==
- Romania during World War I
- Russian Civil War
- White movement
