= Bolimów Landscape Park =

Protected area in Poland

- Bolimowski Park Krajobrazowy
- IUCN category V (protected landscape/seascape)
- Interactive map of Bolimów Landscape Park
- Location: central Poland
- Coordinates: 52.009°N 20.197°E
- Area: 231.3 km^{2} (89.3 mi^{2})
- Established: 1986

Bolimów Landscape Park (Bolimowski Park Krajobrazowy) is a protected area (Landscape Park) in central Poland, established in 1986, covering an area of 231.3 square kilometres (89.3 sq mi).

The Park is shared between two voivodeships: Łódź Voivodeship and Masovian Voivodeship. Within Łódź Voivodeship it lies in Łowicz County (Gmina Nieborów) and Skierniewice County (Gmina Bolimów, Gmina Kowiesy, Gmina Nowy Kawęczyn). Within Masovian Voivodeship it lies in Żyrardów County (Gmina Puszcza Mariańska, Gmina Wiskitki).

The park includes various types of forests, including, pine, birches, maples, lindens and oaks.

Within the Park are five nature reserves.
