= Vladimir Gurko =

Russian government official (1862–1927)

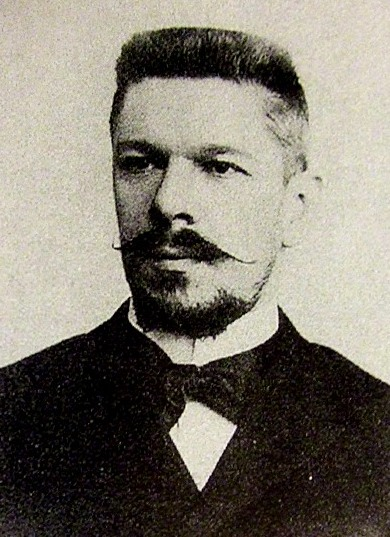
V.I. Gurko.

Vladimir Iosifovich Gurko (Russian: Влади́мир Ио́сифович Гу́рко; December 12, 1862 in Tsarskoye Selo – February 18, 1927 in Paris) was a Russian government official and a member of the Russian Assembly.

== Life ==
He was the son of Iosif Gurko. His brother was general Vasily Gurko.

He graduated from Moscow University, and worked in the State Chancellery of the Ministry of Interior. In 1906, he became Assistant Minister of Interior, and worked with ministers Pyotr Durnovo and Pyotr Stolypin. In 1906 he and the businessman Eric Lidval were involved in the Gurko-Lidval corruption affair.

In 1909 he was elected a member of Tver zemstvo assembly. He campaigned for the position of Tver Marshal of Nobility, but lost. In 1912 Gurko was elected Member of State Council by the Tver zemstvo and joined its right-wing group.

He opposed the 1917 revolution and left Russia afterwards.

He represented the State Unity Council at the Jassy Conference.

He wrote detailed memoirs, which were published by Stanford University.

== Works ==
- V.I. Gurko. Features And Figures Of The Past. Government And Opinion In The Reign Of Nicholas II.
