= 55th Infantry Division (Russian Empire) =

- 55-я пехотная дивизия
- Active: 1914–1918
- Country: Russian Empire
- Branch: Russian Imperial Army
- Role: Infantry

The 55th Infantry Division (Russian: 55-я пехотная дивизия, 55-ya Pekhotnaya Diviziya) was an infantry formation of the Russian Imperial Army.

== Organization ==
- 1st Brigade
  - 217th Infantry Regiment
  - 218th Infantry Regiment
- 2nd Brigade
  - 219th Infantry Regiment
  - 220th Infantry Regiment
- 55th Artillery Brigade
