= Iași National Theatre =

Theatre in Iași, Romania

Coordinates: 47.1632°N 27.5848°E

Vasile Alecsandri National Theatre Teatrul Național „Vasile Alecsandri” din Iași
- Great Theatre of Moldavia
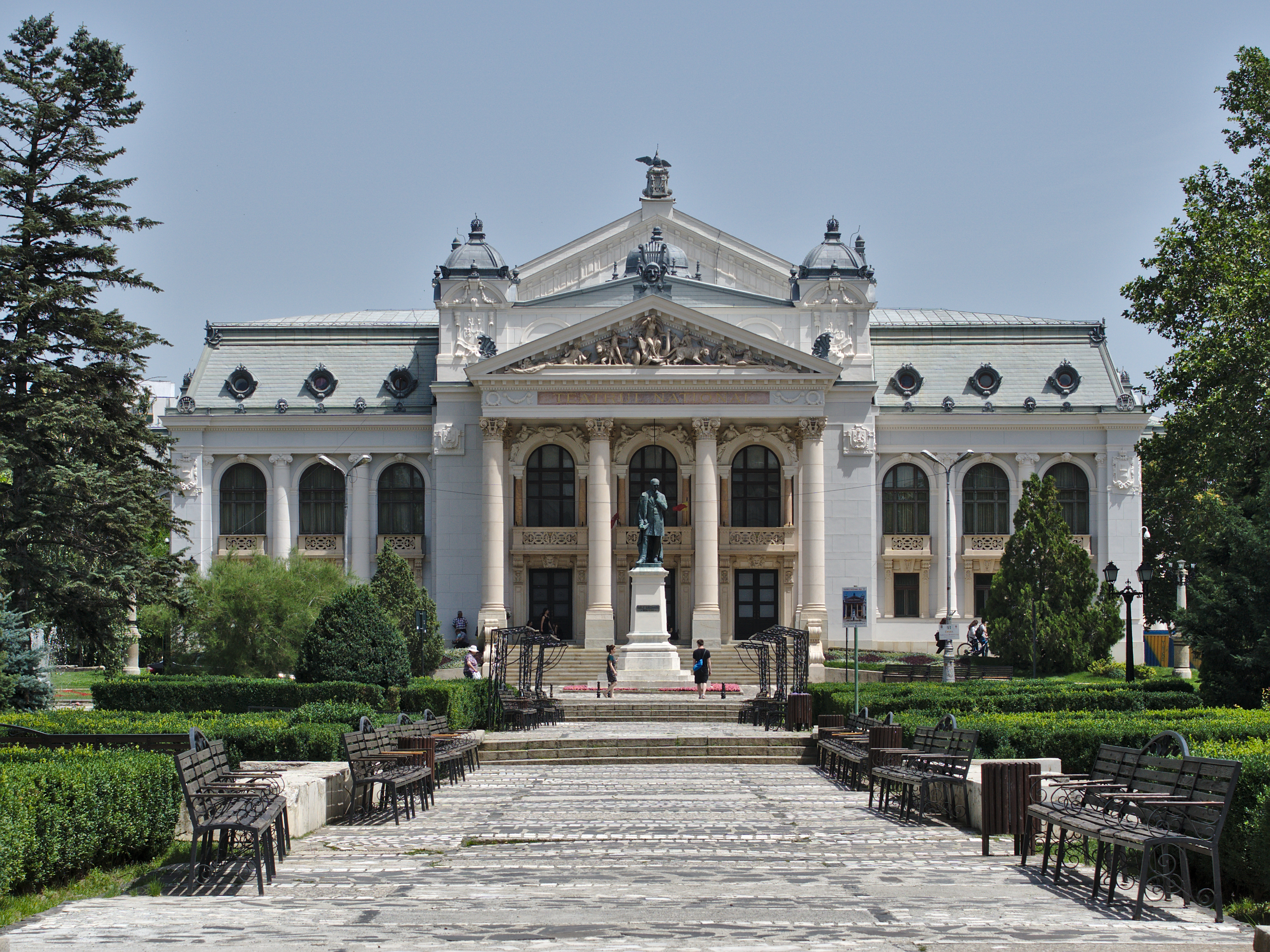
- Front view
- Interactive map of Vasile Alecsandri National Theatre; Teatrul Național „Vasile Alecsandri” din Iași
- Address: 18 Agatha Bârsescu Street; Iași; Romania
- Capacity: Main Hall: 750 seats Teofil Vâlcu Studio Hall: 50-100 seats Cubic Theatre (auxiliary building): 151 seats Theatre Factory (auxiliary building): 100 seats
- Type: National theatre
- Production: Fântâna Blanduziei

Construction
- Opened: 1840
- Rebuilt: 1894-1896
- Architect: Fellner & Helmer

Website
- teatrulnationaliasi.ro

The Iași National Theatre (or Vasile Alecsandri National Theater; in Romanian: Teatrul Național Vasile Alecsandri) in Iași, Romania, is the oldest national theatre and one of the most prestigious theatrical institutions in Romania. In 1956, it was given the name of the renowned Romanian playwright and poet Vasile Alecsandri. The building also hosts the Iași Romanian National Opera.

== History ==
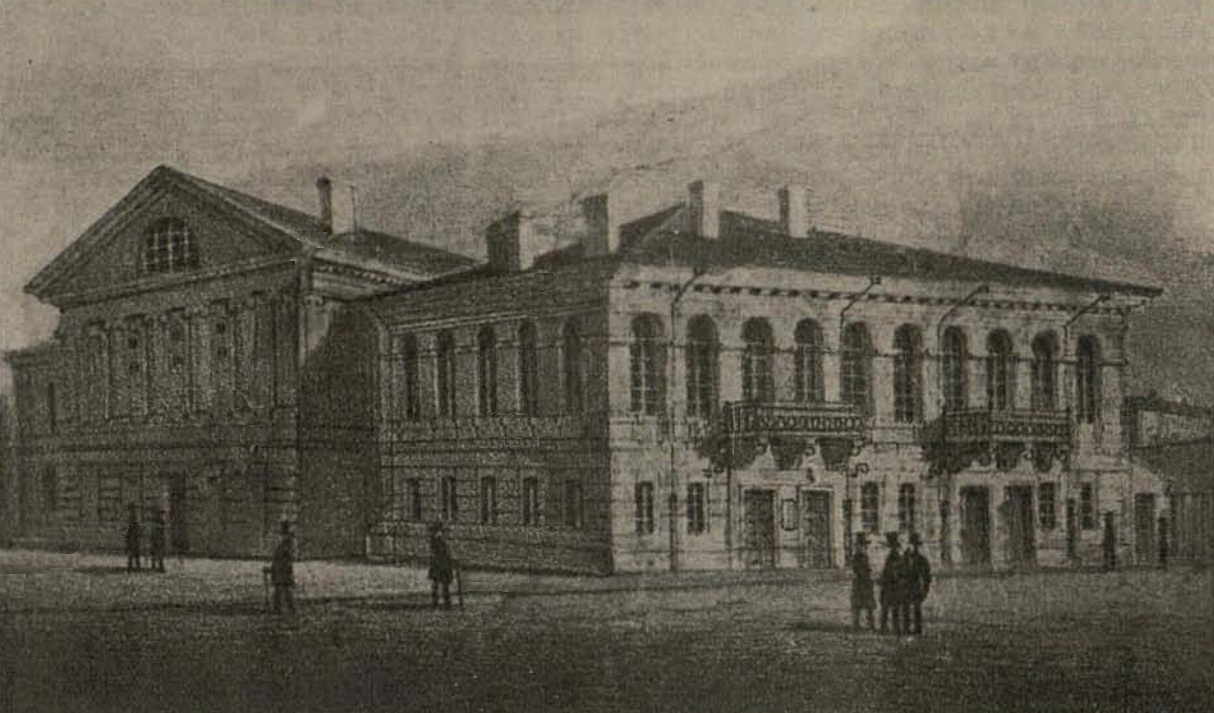
The old building of the National Theatre, 1846

The first dramatic play presented in the Romanian language (and one of the first theatrical performance in Romanian) was Mirtil and Hloe, adapted and staged by Gheorghe Asachi, and held in the capital (Jassy/Iași) of Moldavia, on 27 December 1816. In 1834, a Romanian production took place in Iași on the stage of the Théâtre de varieté, built in 1832 for the French Fouraux troupe.

The National Theatre was founded on 15 May 1840, as the Great Theatre of Moldavia, when the Romanian language troupe, led by Costache Caragiali, was united with the French troupe, under a single direction of Vasile Alecsandri and the management of Costache Caragiali. On 22 December 1846, a new audience hall was inaugurated in the former mansion of Prince Mihail Sturdza, on the Hill of Copou.

== Building ==
On the night of 17/18 February 1888, the theatre building was destroyed by the fire. Efforts to build the new theatre edifice culminated in 1894 when a contract was signed with the Viennese architects Ferdinand Fellner and Hermann Helmer, who designed several theatres and palaces across Europe, including the theatres in Cluj-Napoca, Oradea, Timișoara and Chernivtsi (Romanian: Cernăuți).

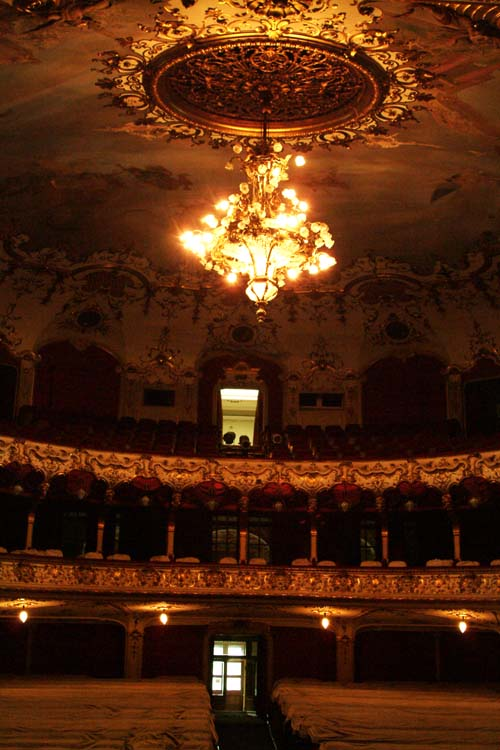
The main auditorium

For the building work, a contract was signed with a Bucharest company, and the power station was built by a company from Berlin. The Theatre’s power station also supplied with electricity the 12 electric-arc lamps lighting the Theatre Square, marking the beginning of electrification in the city of Iași. The works to building took two years, and on 1 and 2 December 1896, the inauguration festivities took place with Flechtenmacher's National Overture, the vaudevilles Muza de la Burdujeni (The Muse from Burdujeni) by Costache Negruzzi and Cinel-cinel (The Riddle) by Vasile Alecsandri, as well as the verse comedy Poetul romantic (The Romantic Poet) by Matei Millo.

The Iași National Theatre building is listed in the National Register of Historic Monuments.

=== Architecture ===
With a Neoclassic exterior and a richly decorated interior in Rococo and Baroque styles, the building is considered one of the most elegant in Romania.

The main auditorium is organised in stalls, boxes and a balcony. The curtain painted by the Viennese M. Lenz, presents in the middle, an allegory of life with its three stages and, to the right side, the allegory of Romanian Unification. The left-hand side, painted by Lenz’s apprentice, differs from the rest of the curtain in style and colouring.

The ceiling and the iron curtain were painted by Alexander Goltz. The iron curtain, which completely separates the scene from the hall, shows ornaments placed symmetrically, while the ceiling has as a narrative basis the Archetypal Story, shown in paradisiacal allegories, with nymphs and cupids framed in rococo stucco.

The 1,418 electric lights and the chandelier with 109 Venetian crystal lamps light up the playhouse.
