= Attacking Cavalryman Statue =

Statue by Ion Dimitriu-Bârlad in Iași, Romania

- Statuia Cavaleristului în atac
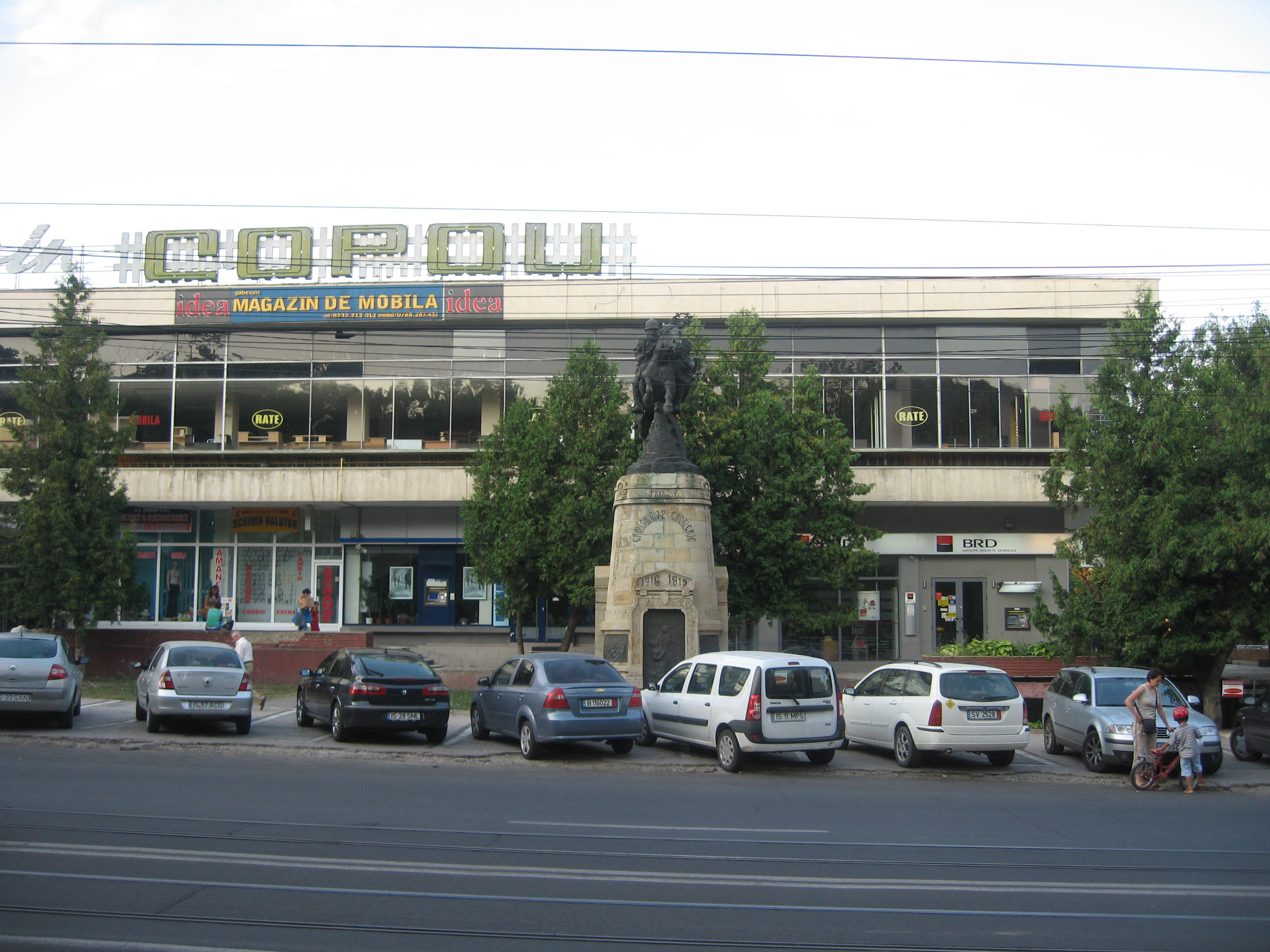
- Interactive map of Attacking Cavalryman Statue
- Location: Carol I Boulevard, in front of Copou Park, Iași
- Coordinates: 47°10′46″N 27°34′07″E
- Designer: Ion Dimitriu-Bârlad
- Type: Bronze sculpture
- Completion date: 1927
- Opening date: May 29, 1927
- Dedicated to: Soldiers of the 2nd Romanian Cavalry Division who fought in World War I

The Attacking Cavalryman Statue in Iași, Romania (Romanian: Statuia Cavaleristului în atac; also known as the Monument to the c (Monumentul Eroilor Diviziei 2-a Cavalerie) or The Prunaru Charge (Șarja de la Prunaru)) is a bronze monument executed by sculptor Ion Dimitriu-Bârlad and unveiled in 1927. One of the city's signature monuments, it is located in front of the SuperCopou store, across the street from the main entrance to Copou Garden.

== Symbolism ==
The statue was produced at the initiative of the 2nd Romanian Cavalry Division who fought in World War I. Funds were collected through pledges, in the obtaining of which the wife of General Naum, commander of the division, played an important role.

The monument seeks to remind succeeding generations of the sacrifice made by the soldiers of the 2nd Roșiori cavalry regiment, who undertook the bloody Prunaru Charge in defence of the road to Bucharest at the end of November 1916; of 5,000 troops, just 134 emerged alive.

The statue depicts a bronze allegory composed of two groups symbolizing Victory and Sacrifice. Victory is represented by a cavalryman on horseback advancing in full charge, with a helmet on his head and a spear in his hand, accompanied by a nymph who has a crown of laurels in her outstretched hand. The nymph symbolizes a guardian angel, or the mother, wife or daughter whom the hero would never see again.

The pedestal is six metres high and includes a crypt of Sacrifice, which is entered through the Gate of Immortality (also made of bronze) with a bas-relief representing Sacrifice: a mortally wounded horseman falling into the arms of an angel who crowns his brow with laurels. Inside the crypt there is a candle, illuminated with electric light, that keeps eternal watch over the names carved into marble at the sides of the pedestal.

Each of the pedestal's four sides had bronze bas-reliefs with images from the battles fought by the 2nd Cavalry Division at Prunaru, Măgheruș, the Dniester, and Tisza–Budapest. Currently, one of the four bas-reliefs (at the back of the right side) is missing.

On the left side of the pedestal, between two bas-reliefs, a marble plaque reads: "În anul 1927 sub glorioasa domnie a M.S. Regelui Ferdinand I" ("In the year 1927 under the glorious reign of H.M. King Ferdinand I"). On the right side of the pedestal, between a bas-relief and the space that once held another, a second marble plaque reads: "Divizia 2-a Cavalerie recunoscătoare acelor cari s'au sacrificat pentru țară în răsboiul întregirei neamului 1916–1919" ("The 2nd Cavalry Division honours those who sacrificed themselves for the country in the war for the union of our people 1916–1919").

== Unveiling ==
The statue was unveiled on Sunday, May 29, 1927, before Queen Marie, Princess Ileana, Princess Helen, and the young crown prince Michael. King Ferdinand, who would die that July 20, was gravely ill and thus did not attend.

The unveiling happened at 11:30 am, after Princess Olga Sturdza's Union Monument, which had been unveiled at 10:15.

The monument was initially surrounded by a small garden, but in 1968 today's SuperCopou store, as well as the Copou cinema, were built behind it.

== Gallery ==
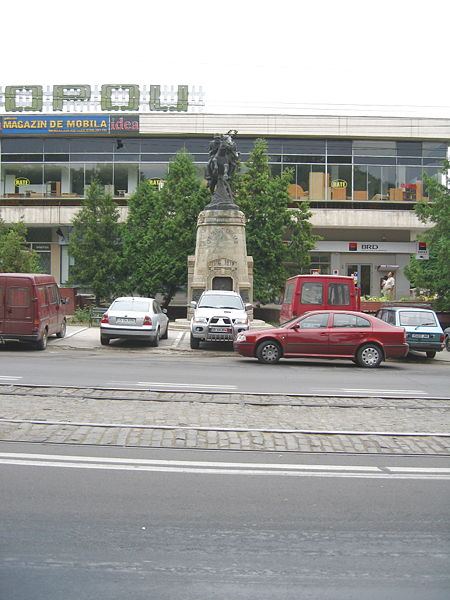
The front of the statue, seen from the entrance to Copou Garden.

The Gate of Immortality.

Front left bas-relief.

Back left bas-relief.

Front right bas-relief.

Empty spot that once held the back right bas-relief.

== Bibliography ==
- Mitican, Ion. Urcînd Copoul cu gîndul la Podul Verde. Ed. Tehnopress, Iași, 2006.
- Suceveanu, Eugen. Obiective istorico-turistice. Iași, 1983.
