= Radzyński =

Jasieńczyk coat of arms used by some of Radzyński family

Radzyński (feminine: Radzyńska) is a Polish surname. Some of them use Jasieńczyk coat of arms. Notable people with the surname include:

- David Radzynski (born 1986), American classical violinist and concertmaster
- Jan Radzynski (born 1950), Polish-born Israeli-American composer

== Places ==
- Radzyń County (Polish: powiat radzyński)
- Radzyńska Struga
- Branica Radzyńska
- Branica Radzyńska-Kolonia
- Żakowola Radzyńska
- Bedlno Radzyńskie

== See also ==
- Radziński
