= Władysław Szaniawski =

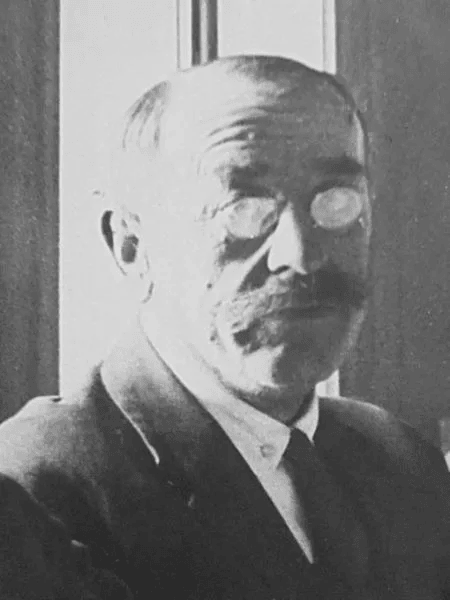
- Born: 15 July 1861
- Died: 16 January 1931 (aged 69)
- Resting place: Cemetery at Przegaliny Duże
- Citizenship: Poland
- Education: Ecole Speciale des Arts et Manufactures, Gent, Belgium
- Known for: Astronomical observatory in Przegaliny Duże

Władysław Szaniawski (15 July 1861 – 16 January 1931) was a Polish inventor and landowner known for establishing an astronomical observatory and meteorological station at his estate in Przegaliny Duże.

== Early life and education ==
Władysław Szaniawski was born on 15 July 1861 in Przegaliny Duże, in the Radzyń County. He was the only son of Countess Ksawera Adelajda Bieńkowska of the Jastrzębiec coat of arms and Wiktor Szaniawski of the Junosza coat of arms, a landowner. His father participated in the 1863 January uprising, which led to his imprisonment and death sentence by Russian authorities, a fate he avoided through the efforts of his wife and friends.

Szaniawski received his early education at the 4th Classical Gymnasium in Warsaw and later attended St. Anna Gymnasium in Cracow, graduating in 1880. With a strong aptitude for mathematics and mechanics, he pursued higher education in Ghent, Belgium, where he enrolled at the Ecole Speciale des Arts et Manufactures. He graduated in 1884 with a degree in engineering, receiving the highest distinction (grande distinction).

== Professional career ==
After completing his education, Szaniawski returned to Poland, where he worked briefly in the design department of K. Rudzki i S-ka, an engineering and construction company in Warsaw. The company was known for constructing significant bridges in Central and Eastern Europe, including the Poniatowski Bridge in Warsaw and the Khabarovsk Bridge in Russia.

Despite his promising career in engineering, Szaniawski chose to manage his family estate in Przegaliny. His management of the estate provided the financial resources necessary to pursue his scientific interests.

== Scientific endeavors ==
Szaniawski established a mechanical workshop at his estate, equipped with precise instruments such as lathes and machines for cutting cogs and gearwheels. He invented various mechanical and electrical devices, including an instrument for determining wind direction and speed, which was presented at a Warsaw Scientific Society meeting in 1910. This device, called an "anemophone", allowed wind speed and direction to be measured audibly from a distance.

Szaniawski also set up a second-class meteorological station at Przegaliny, which he operated for many years. He constructed several pendulum clocks, including one that displayed the phases of the moon. Additionally, he built large striking tower clocks, one of which was installed in the Żelechów church, while another was donated to the church in Komarówka Podlaska.

== Astronomical observatory ==
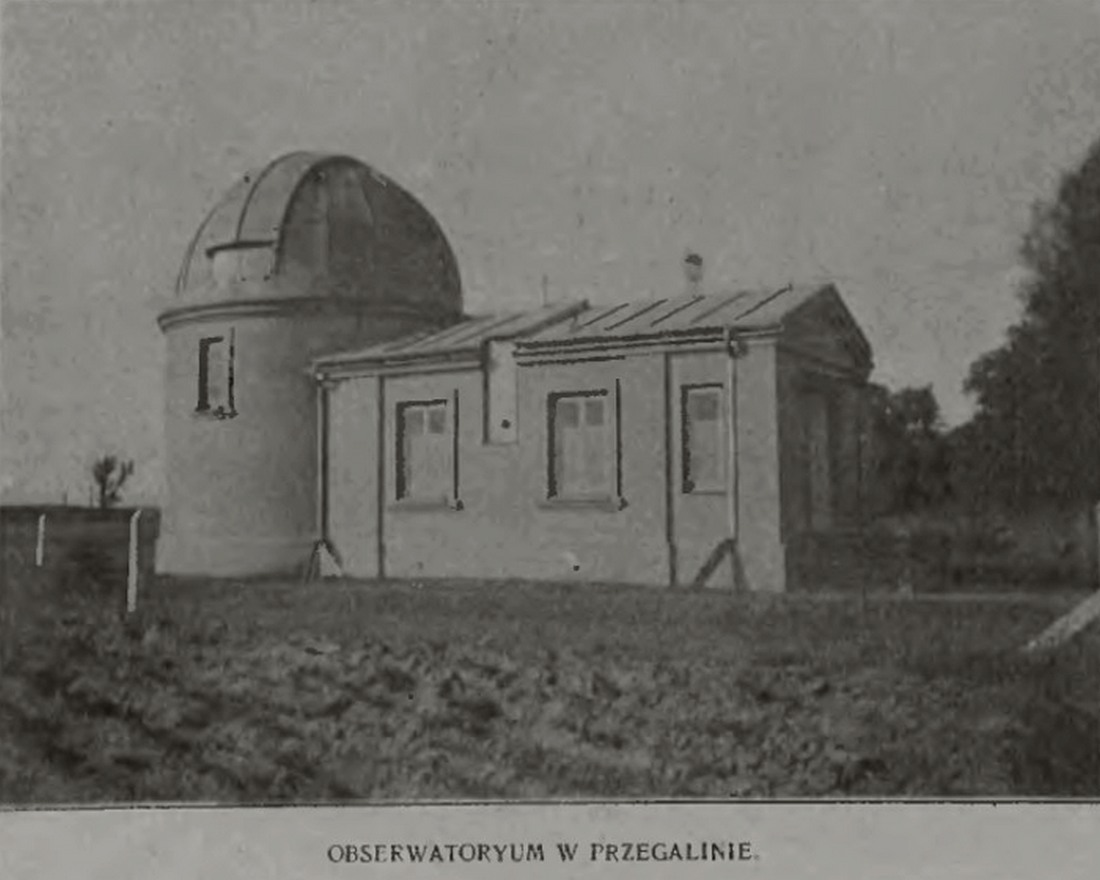
Astronomical observatory in Przegaliny Duże

In 1909, Szaniawski built an astronomical observatory at his estate. The observatory featured a rectangular building with a meridian room housing a meridian wheel from the Parisian Mailhat factory, equipped with an 81 mm lens. The observatory also included a precise pendulum clock and a Riefler clock with a steel-nickel pendulum.

The main instrument of the observatory was a refractor telescope, which at the time was the largest in Poland. It featured a 20 cm Zeiss lens with a 310 cm focal length and was equipped with two astro cameras for photographing the sky. The observatory also had a radio receiving station, and Szaniawski was the first in Poland to receive permission to use radio equipment from the Ministry of Posts and Telegraphs.

During World War I, the observatory was damaged, and some instruments were stolen but later returned. However, the estate's financial difficulties and the broader economic crisis forced Szaniawski to close the observatory in 1925. The instruments were sold to the Nicolaus Copernicus National Astronomical Institute.

== Death ==
Władysław Szaniawski died on 16 January 1931 and was buried in the cemetery at Przegaliny Duże. His grave remains cared for by local residents.

== Present day ==
The former Szaniawski estate in Przegaliny is now the headquarters of the local motorcycle club "Panther".
