= Wola Osowińska-Kolonia =

- Village
- Location within Poland
- Coordinates: 51°44′N 22°28′E
- Country: Poland
- Voivodeship: Lublin
- County: Radzyń
- Gmina: Borki
- Population: ok. 100

Wola Osowińska [ˈvɔla ɔsɔˈviɲska] is a village in the administrative district of Gmina Borki, within Radzyń County, Lublin Voivodeship, in eastern Poland. It lies approximately 7 kilometres (4 mi) west of Borki, 15 km (9 mi) south-west of Radzyń Podlaski, and 57 km (35 mi) north of the regional capital Lublin.
