= Przegaliny Małe =

- Village
- Location within Poland
- Coordinates: 51°48′48″N 22°51′5″E
- Country: Poland
- Voivodeship: Lublin
- County: Radzyń
- Gmina: Komarówka Podlaska
- Population: 146

Przegaliny Małe [pʂɛɡaˈlinɨ ˈmawɛ] is a village in the administrative district of Gmina Komarówka Podlaska, within Radzyń County, Lublin Voivodeship, in eastern Poland.
