= Płudy, Radzyń County =

Płudy
- Village
- Location within Poland
- Coordinates: 51°50′N 22°38′E
- Country: Poland
- Voivodeship: Lublin
- County: Radzyń
- Gmina: Radzyń Podlaski
- Population: 340

Płudy [ˈpwudɨ] is a village in the administrative district of Gmina Radzyń Podlaski, within Radzyń County, Lublin Voivodeship, in eastern Poland.
