= Rozwadów (disambiguation) =

Rozwadów is a former town, now a suburb of Stalowa Wola, in south-east Poland.

Rozwadów may also refer to the following villages:

- Rozwadów, Lublin Voivodeship (east Poland)
- Rozwadów, Masovian Voivodeship (east-central Poland)
- Rozvadiv (Polish: Rozwadów), Lviv Oblast (Ukraine)
