= Woroniec, Radzyń County =

Woroniec
- Village
- Location within Poland
- Coordinates: 51°48′33″N 23°1′43″E
- Country: Poland
- Voivodeship: Lublin
- County: Radzyń
- Gmina: Komarówka Podlaska
- Population: 158

Woroniec [vɔˈrɔɲɛt͡s] is a village in the administrative district of Gmina Komarówka Podlaska, within Radzyń County, Lublin Voivodeship, in eastern Poland.
