= Lichty =

- Village
- Location within Poland
- Coordinates: 51°43′N 22°38′E
- Country: Poland
- Voivodeship: Lublin
- County: Radzyń
- Gmina: Czemierniki

Lichty [ˈlixtɨ] is a village in the administrative district of Gmina Czemierniki, within Radzyń County, Lublin Voivodeship, in eastern Poland.
