= Bełcząc, Lublin Voivodeship =

Bełcząc
- Village
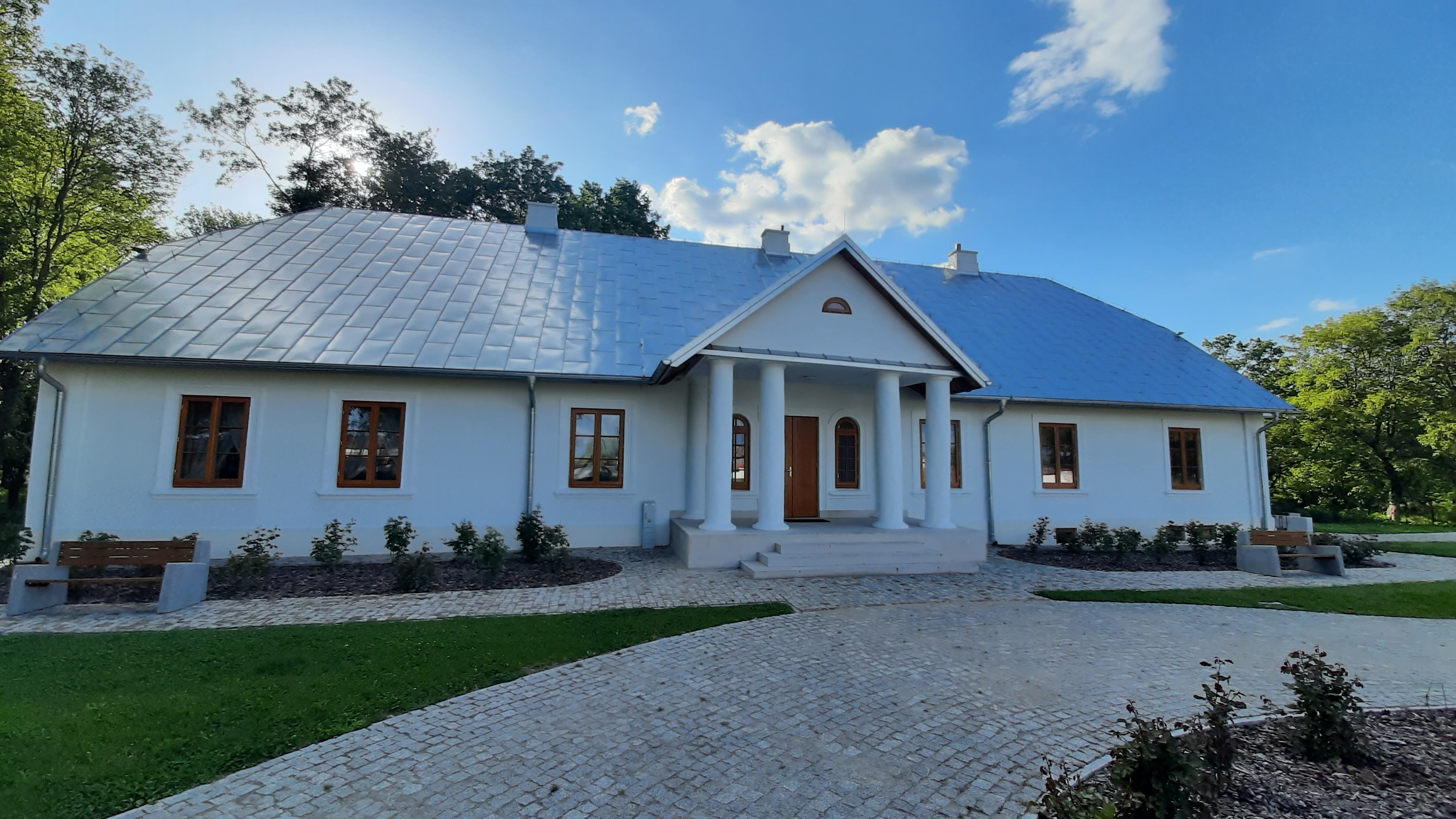
- Manor in the village

- Location within Poland
- Coordinates: 51°40′N 22°35′E
- Country: Poland
- Voivodeship: Lublin
- County: Radzyń
- Gmina: Czemierniki

Bełcząc [ˈbɛu̯t͡ʂɔnt͡s] is a village in the administrative district of Gmina Czemierniki, within Radzyń County, Lublin Voivodeship, in eastern Poland.
