= Skrzyszew =

- Village
- Location within Poland
- Coordinates: 51°51′N 22°29′E
- Country: Poland
- Voivodeship: Lublin
- County: Radzyń
- Gmina: Ulan-Majorat
- Population: 161

Skrzyszew [ˈskʂɨʂɛf] is a village in the administrative district of Gmina Ulan-Majorat, within Radzyń County, Lublin Voivodeship, in eastern Poland.

== Population ==
Historical population
| Year | Pop. | ±% p.a. |
|---|---|---|
| 2011 | 178 | — |
| 2021 | 161 | −1.00% |
Source: City Population
