= Zarzec Ulański =

- Village
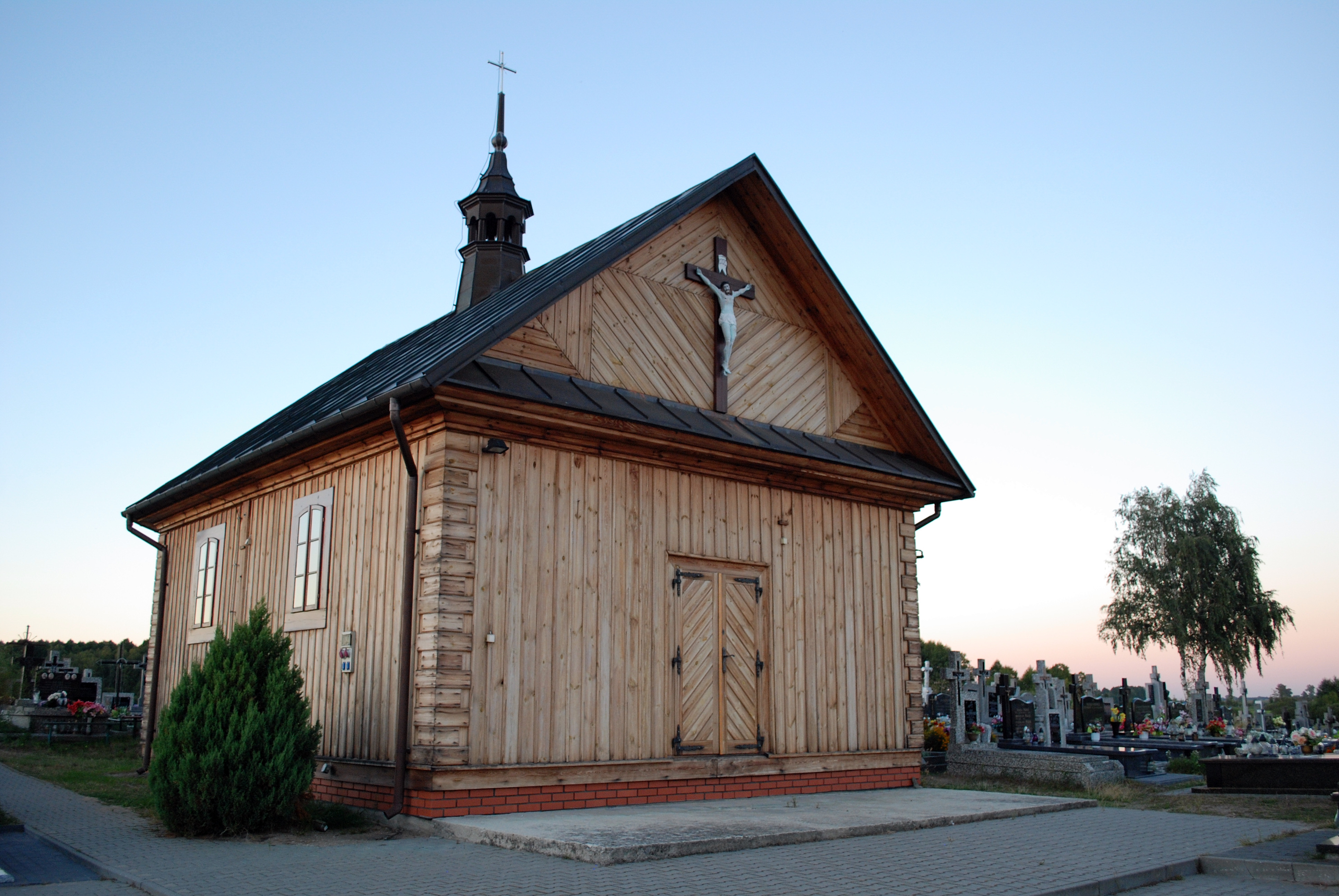

- Location within Poland
- Coordinates: 51°48′04″N 22°28′10″E
- Country: Poland
- Voivodeship: Lublin
- County: Radzyń
- Gmina: Ulan-Majorat

Zarzec Ulański [ˈzaʐɛt͡s uˈlaɲski] is a village in the administrative district of Gmina Ulan-Majorat, within Radzyń County, Lublin Voivodeship, in eastern Poland.
