= Wygnanów, Lublin Voivodeship =

Wygnanów
- Village
- Location within Poland
- Coordinates: 51°40′N 22°38′E
- Country: Poland
- Voivodeship: Lublin
- County: Radzyń
- Gmina: Czemierniki

Wygnanów [vɨɡˈnanuf] is a village in the administrative district of Gmina Czemierniki, within Radzyń County, Lublin Voivodeship, in eastern Poland.
