= Walinna =

- Village
- Location within Poland
- Coordinates: 51°49′45″N 22°59′19″E
- Country: Poland
- Voivodeship: Lublin
- County: Radzyń
- Gmina: Komarówka Podlaska
- Population: 384

Walinna [vaˈlinna] is a village in the administrative district of Gmina Komarówka Podlaska, within Radzyń County, Lublin Voivodeship, in eastern Poland.
