= Sokule =

Sokule may refer to the following places:

- Sokule, Gmina Drelów, Biała County in Lublin Voivodeship (east Poland)
- Sokule, Radzyń County in Lublin Voivodeship (east Poland)
- Sokule, Masovian Voivodeship (east-central Poland)
