= Paszki Duże =

- Village
- Location within Poland
- Coordinates: 51°44′N 22°36′E
- Country: Poland
- Voivodeship: Lublin
- County: Radzyń
- Gmina: Radzyń Podlaski

Paszki Duże [ˈpaʂki ˈduʐɛ] is a village in the administrative district of Gmina Radzyń Podlaski, within Radzyń County, Lublin Voivodeship, in eastern Poland.
