= Jaski, Lublin Voivodeship =

Jaski
- Village
- Location within Poland
- Coordinates: 51°51′27″N 22°36′10″E
- Country: Poland
- Voivodeship: Lublin
- County: Radzyń
- Gmina: Radzyń Podlaski

Jaski [ˈjaski] is a village in the administrative district of Gmina Radzyń Podlaski, within Radzyń County, Lublin Voivodeship, in eastern Poland.
