= Wierzchowiny, Radzyń County =

Wierzchowiny
- Village
- Location within Poland
- Coordinates: 51°49′38″N 22°32′04″E
- Country: Poland
- Voivodeship: Lublin
- County: Radzyń
- Gmina: Ulan-Majorat

Wierzchowiny [vjɛʂxɔˈvinɨ] is a village in the administrative district of Gmina Ulan-Majorat, within Radzyń County, Lublin Voivodeship, in eastern Poland.
