= Wólka Komarowska =

- Village
- Location within Poland
- Coordinates: 51°49′29″N 22°57′51″E
- Country: Poland
- Voivodeship: Lublin
- County: Radzyń
- Gmina: Komarówka Podlaska
- Population: 232

Wólka Komarowska [ˈvulka kɔmaˈrɔfska] is a village in the administrative district of Gmina Komarówka Podlaska, within Radzyń County, Lublin Voivodeship, in eastern Poland.
