= Wrzosów, Lublin Voivodeship =

Wrzosów
- Village
- Location within Poland
- Coordinates: 51°42′N 22°34′E
- Country: Poland
- Voivodeship: Lublin
- County: Radzyń
- Gmina: Borki

Wrzosów [ˈvʐɔsuf] is a village in the administrative district of Gmina Borki, within Radzyń County, Lublin Voivodeship, in eastern Poland.
