= Osowno =

- Village
- Location within Poland
- Coordinates: 51°43′14″N 22°29′25″E
- Country: Poland
- Voivodeship: Lublin
- County: Radzyń
- Gmina: Borki
- Population: 400

Osowno [ɔˈsɔvnɔ] is a village in the administrative district of Gmina Borki, within Radzyń County, Lublin Voivodeship, in eastern Poland.
