= Sitno, Radzyń County =

Sitno
- Village
- Location within Poland
- Coordinates: 51°45′N 22°33′E
- Country: Poland
- Voivodeship: Lublin
- County: Radzyń
- Gmina: Borki
- Time zone: UTC+1 (CET)
  - Summer (DST): UTC+2 (CEST)

Sitno [ˈɕitnɔ] is a village in the administrative district of Gmina Borki, within Radzyń County, Lublin Voivodeship, in eastern Poland.

== History ==
Nine Polish citizens were murdered by Nazi Germany in the village during World War II.
