= Biała, Lublin Voivodeship =

Biała
- Village
- Location within Poland
- Coordinates: 51°47′10″N 22°34′21″E
- Country: Poland
- Voivodeship: Lublin
- County: Radzyń
- Gmina: Radzyń Podlaski
- Population: 1,100

Biała [ˈbjawa] is a village in the administrative district of Gmina Radzyń Podlaski, within Radzyń County, Lublin Voivodeship, in eastern Poland.
