= Stasinów, Lublin Voivodeship =

Stasinów
- Village
- Location within Poland
- Coordinates: 51°46′45″N 22°41′43″E
- Country: Poland
- Voivodeship: Lublin
- County: Radzyń
- Gmina: Radzyń Podlaski

Stasinów [staˈɕinuf] is a village in the administrative district of Gmina Radzyń Podlaski, within Radzyń County, Lublin Voivodeship, in eastern Poland.
