= Radinsky =

Radinsky is a surname. Notable people with the surname include:

- Kira Radinsky (born 1986), Israeli computer scientist, inventor and entrepreneur
- Leonard Radinsky (1937–1985), American paleontologist
- Scott Radinsky (born 1968), baseball player and singer

== See also ==
- Radinska
- Radzinsky
- Radzinski
