= Zabiele, Radzyń County =

Zabiele
- Village
- Location within Poland
- Coordinates: 51°45′55″N 22°35′43″E
- Country: Poland
- Voivodeship: Lublin
- County: Radzyń
- Gmina: Radzyń Podlaski
- Population: 569

Zabiele [zaˈbjɛlɛ] is a village in the administrative district of Gmina Radzyń Podlaski, within Radzyń County, Lublin Voivodeship, in eastern Poland.
