= Marynin, Radzyń County =

Marynin
- Village
- Location within Poland
- Coordinates: 51°45′35″N 22°38′42″E
- Country: Poland
- Voivodeship: Lublin
- County: Radzyń
- Gmina: Radzyń Podlaski

Marynin [maˈrɨnin] is a village in the administrative district of Gmina Radzyń Podlaski, within Radzyń County, Lublin Voivodeship, in eastern Poland.
