= Tchórzew (disambiguation) =

Tchórzew may refer to one of the following locations in Poland:

- Tchórzew, Lublin Voivodeship
- Tchórzew, Masovian Voivodeship
- Tchórzew-Plewki
- Tchórzew-Kolonia
