= Klębów =

- Village
- Location within Poland
- Coordinates: 51°50′31″N 22°27′12″E
- Country: Poland
- Voivodeship: Lublin
- County: Radzyń
- Gmina: Ulan-Majorat

Klębów [ˈklɛmbuf] is a village in the administrative district of Gmina Ulan-Majorat, within Radzyń County, Lublin Voivodeship, in eastern Poland. The village had a population of approximately 118 inhabitants in 2009.
