= Skoki, Radzyń County =

Skoki
- Village
- Location within Poland
- Coordinates: 51°43′N 22°40′E
- Country: Poland
- Voivodeship: Lublin
- County: Radzyń
- Gmina: Czemierniki

Skoki [ˈskɔki] is a village in the administrative district of Gmina Czemierniki, within Radzyń County, Lublin Voivodeship, in eastern Poland.
