= Sobole, Lublin Voivodeship =

Sobole
- Village
- Location within Poland
- Coordinates: 51°49′N 22°25′E
- Country: Poland
- Voivodeship: Lublin
- County: Radzyń
- Gmina: Ulan-Majorat

Sobole [sɔˈbɔlɛ] is a village in the administrative district of Gmina Ulan-Majorat, within Radzyń County, Lublin Voivodeship, in eastern Poland.
