= Kolonia Domaszewnica =

- Village
- Location within Poland
- Coordinates: 51°50′54″N 22°24′05″E
- Country: Poland
- Voivodeship: Lublin
- County: Radzyń
- Gmina: Ulan-Majorat

Kolonia Domaszewnica [kɔˈlɔɲa dɔmaʂɛvˈnit͡sa] is a village in the administrative district of Gmina Ulan-Majorat, within Radzyń County, Lublin Voivodeship, in eastern Poland.
