= Stara Wieś, Radzyń County =

Stara Wieś
- Village
- Location within Poland
- Coordinates: 51°42′27″N 22°32′55″E
- Country: Poland
- Voivodeship: Lublin
- County: Radzyń
- Gmina: Borki

Stara Wieś [ˈstara ˈvjɛɕ] is a village in the administrative district of Gmina Borki, within Radzyń County, Lublin Voivodeship, in eastern Poland.
