= Nowiny, Radzyń County =

Nowiny
- Village
- Location within Poland
- Coordinates: 51°42′57″N 22°25′15″E
- Country: Poland
- Voivodeship: Lublin
- County: Radzyń
- Gmina: Borki

Nowiny [nɔˈvinɨ] is a village in the administrative district of Gmina Borki, within Radzyń County, Lublin Voivodeship, in eastern Poland.
