= Zakrzew, Radzyń County =

Zakrzew
- Village
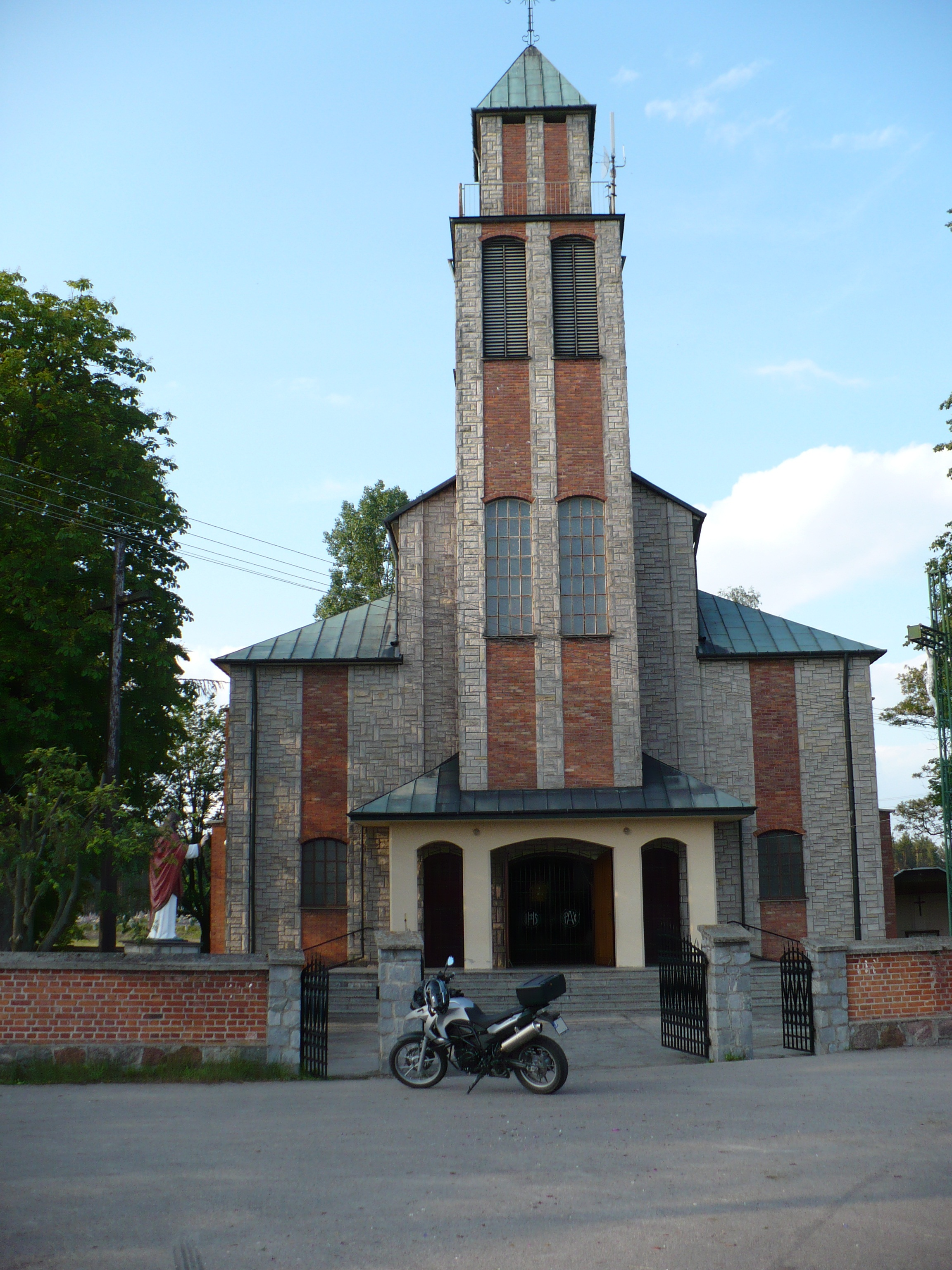

- Location within Poland
- Coordinates: 51°51′42″N 22°33′03″E
- Country: Poland
- Voivodeship: Lublin
- County: Radzyń
- Gmina: Ulan-Majorat

Zakrzew [ˈzakʂɛf] is a village in the administrative district of Gmina Ulan-Majorat, within Radzyń County, Lublin Voivodeship, in eastern Poland.
