= Kolembrody =

- Village
- Location within Poland
- Coordinates: 51°51′12″N 23°0′58″E
- Country: Poland
- Voivodeship: Lublin
- County: Radzyń
- Gmina: Komarówka Podlaska
- Population: 538

Kolembrody [kɔlɛmˈbrɔdɨ] is a village in the administrative district of Gmina Komarówka Podlaska, within Radzyń County, Lublin Voivodeship, in eastern Poland.
