= Krasew =

- Village
- Location within Poland
- Coordinates: 51°45′56″N 22°27′40″E
- Country: Poland
- Voivodeship: Lublin
- County: Radzyń
- Gmina: Borki

Krasew [ˈkrasɛf] is a village in the administrative district of Gmina Borki, within Radzyń County, Lublin Voivodeship, in eastern Poland.
