= Tchórzewski =

Tchórzewski, feminine: Tchórzewska is a Polish surname. It is a toponymic surname derived from a location named Tchórzew. Notable people with this surname include:

- Anna Danuta Tchórzewska (1924–2004), Polish female World War II military commander
- Ed Tchorzewski (1943–2008), Canadian politician
- Krzysztof Tchórzewski (b. 1950), Polish engineer and politician
