= Brzostówiec =

- Village
- Location within Poland
- Coordinates: 51°49′52″N 22°34′54″E
- Country: Poland
- Voivodeship: Lublin
- County: Radzyń
- Gmina: Radzyń Podlaski
- Time zone: UTC+1 (CET)
  - Summer (DST): UTC+2 (CEST)

Brzostówiec [bʐɔsˈtuvjɛt͡s] is a village in the administrative district of Gmina Radzyń Podlaski, within Radzyń County, Lublin Voivodeship, in eastern Poland.

== History ==
Eight Polish citizens were murdered by Nazi Germany in the village during World War II.
