= Ulan Mały =

- Village
- Location within Poland
- Coordinates: 51°48′06″N 22°30′16″E
- Country: Poland
- Voivodeship: Lublin
- County: Radzyń
- Gmina: Ulan-Majorat

Ulan Mały [ˈulan ˈmawɨ] is a village in the administrative district of Gmina Ulan-Majorat, within Radzyń County, Lublin Voivodeship, in eastern Poland.
