= Stojka =

Stojka may refer to:

Places:

- Stójka, Podlaskie Voivodeship, village in Podlaskie Voivodeship, Poland
- Stójka, Lublin Voivodeship, village in Lublin Voivodeship, Poland

People:

- Andre Stojka (born 1944), American voice actor
- Ceija Stojka (1933–2013), Austrian-Romani writer, painter and musician
- Harri Stojka (born 1957), Austrian jazz guitarist

== See also ==
- Stoica (disambiguation)
