= Wiski, Radzyń County =

Wiski
- Village
- Location within Poland
- Coordinates: 51°47′59″N 22°58′15″E
- Country: Poland
- Voivodeship: Lublin
- County: Radzyń
- Gmina: Komarówka Podlaska
- Population: 328

Wiski [ˈviski] is a village in the administrative district of Gmina Komarówka Podlaska, within Radzyń County, Lublin Voivodeship, in eastern Poland.
