= Maruszewiec =

- Village
- Location within Poland
- Coordinates: 51°41′51″N 22°31′45″E
- Country: Poland
- Voivodeship: Lublin
- County: Radzyń
- Gmina: Borki

Maruszewiec [maruˈʂɛvjɛt͡s] is a village in the administrative district of Gmina Borki, within Radzyń County, Lublin Voivodeship, in eastern Poland.
