= Wola Chomejowa =

- Village
- Location within Poland
- Coordinates: 51°44′N 22°28′E
- Country: Poland
- Voivodeship: Lublin
- County: Radzyń
- Gmina: Borki

Wola Chomejowa [ˈvɔla xɔmɛˈjɔva] is a village in the administrative district of Gmina Borki, within Radzyń County, Lublin Voivodeship, in eastern Poland.
