= Bedlno, Lublin Voivodeship =

Bedlno
- Village
- Location within Poland
- Coordinates: 51°48′41″N 22°32′38″E
- Country: Poland
- Voivodeship: Lublin
- County: Radzyń
- Gmina: Radzyń Podlaski

Bedlno [ˈbɛdlnɔ] is a village in the administrative district of Gmina Radzyń Podlaski, within Radzyń County, Lublin Voivodeship, in eastern Poland. The village is the seat of the administrative district (gmina) known as Gmina Bedlno.
