= Brzozowy Kąt, Lublin Voivodeship =

Brzozowy Kąt
- Village
- Location within Poland
- Coordinates: 51°47′8″N 23°0′19″E
- Country: Poland
- Voivodeship: Lublin
- County: Radzyń
- Gmina: Komarówka Podlaska
- Population: 436

Brzozowy Kąt [bʐɔˈzɔvɨ ˈkɔnt] is a village in the administrative district of Gmina Komarówka Podlaska, within Radzyń County, Lublin Voivodeship, in eastern Poland.
