= Kolonia Domaszewska =

- Village
- Location within Poland
- Coordinates: 51°51′30″N 22°22′17″E
- Country: Poland
- Voivodeship: Lublin
- County: Radzyń
- Gmina: Ulan-Majorat

Kolonia Domaszewska [kɔˈlɔɲa dɔmaˈʂɛfska] is a village in the administrative district of Gmina Ulan-Majorat, within Radzyń County, Lublin Voivodeship, in eastern Poland.
