= Główne =

- Village
- Location within Poland
- Coordinates: 51°52′00″N 22°35′24″E
- Country: Poland
- Voivodeship: Lublin
- County: Radzyń
- Gmina: Radzyń Podlaski

Główne [ˈɡwuvnɛ] is a village in the administrative district of Gmina Radzyń Podlaski, within Radzyń County, Lublin Voivodeship, in eastern Poland.
