= Sętki =

- Village
- Location within Poland
- Coordinates: 51°50′N 22°25′E
- Country: Poland
- Voivodeship: Lublin
- County: Radzyń
- Gmina: Ulan-Majorat

Sętki [ˈsɛntki] is a village in the administrative district of Gmina Ulan-Majorat, within Radzyń County, Lublin Voivodeship, in eastern Poland. It is situated approximately 16 km (10 mi) west of Radzyń Podlaski and 66 km (41 mi) north of the regional capital Lublin.
