= Brzeziny, Radzyń County =

Brzeziny
- Village
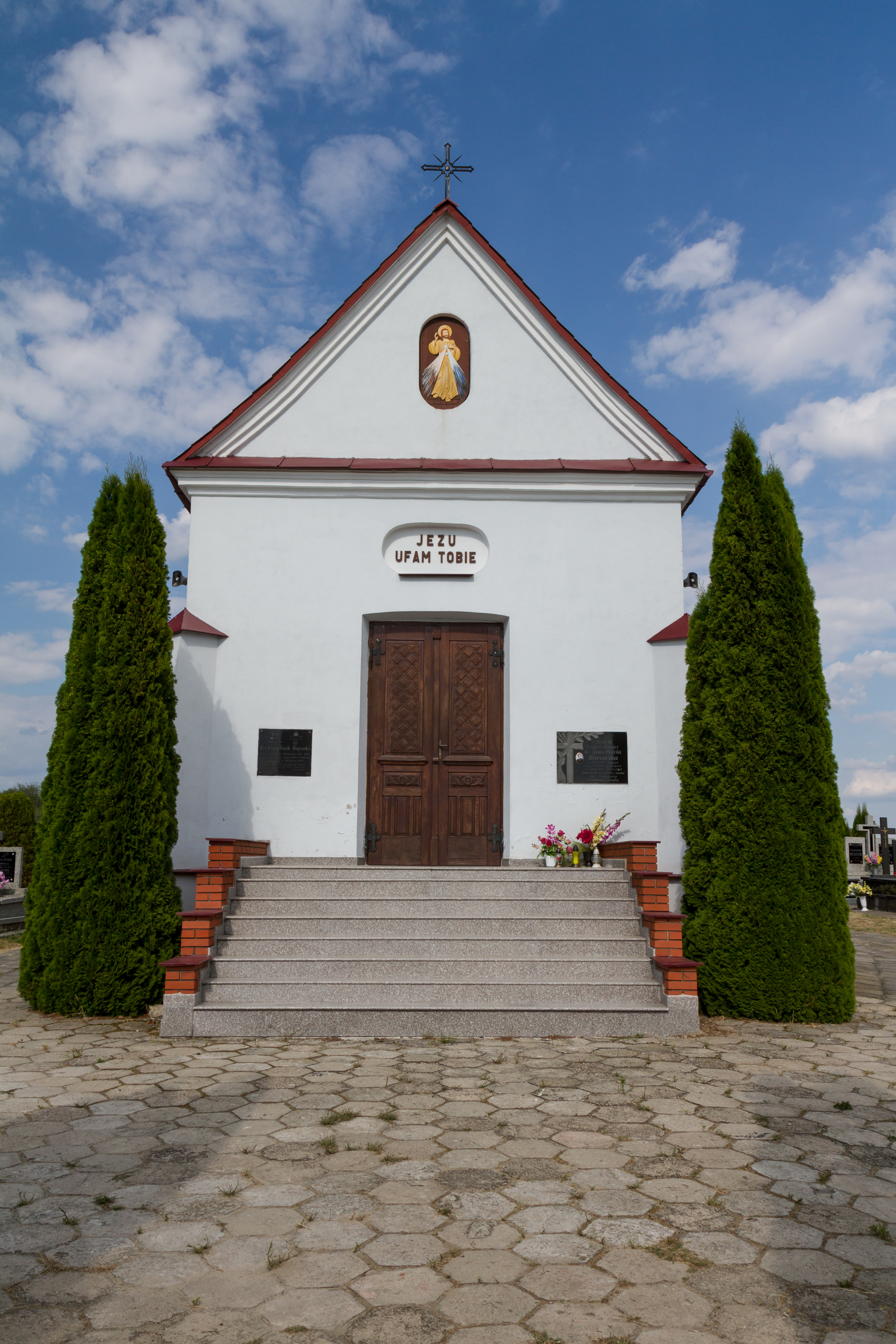
- Cemetery chapel in Brzeziny

- Location within Poland
- Coordinates: 51°48′34″N 22°53′33″E
- Country: Poland
- Voivodeship: Lublin
- County: Radzyń
- Gmina: Komarówka Podlaska

Population
  - Total: 124
- Time zone: UTC+1 (CET)
  - Summer (DST): UTC+2 (CEST)

Brzeziny [bʐɛˈʑinɨ] is a village in the administrative district of Gmina Komarówka Podlaska, within Radzyń County, Lublin Voivodeship, in eastern Poland.

== History ==
Three Polish citizens were murdered by Nazi Germany in the village during World War II.
