= Żabików, Lublin Voivodeship =

Żabików
- Village
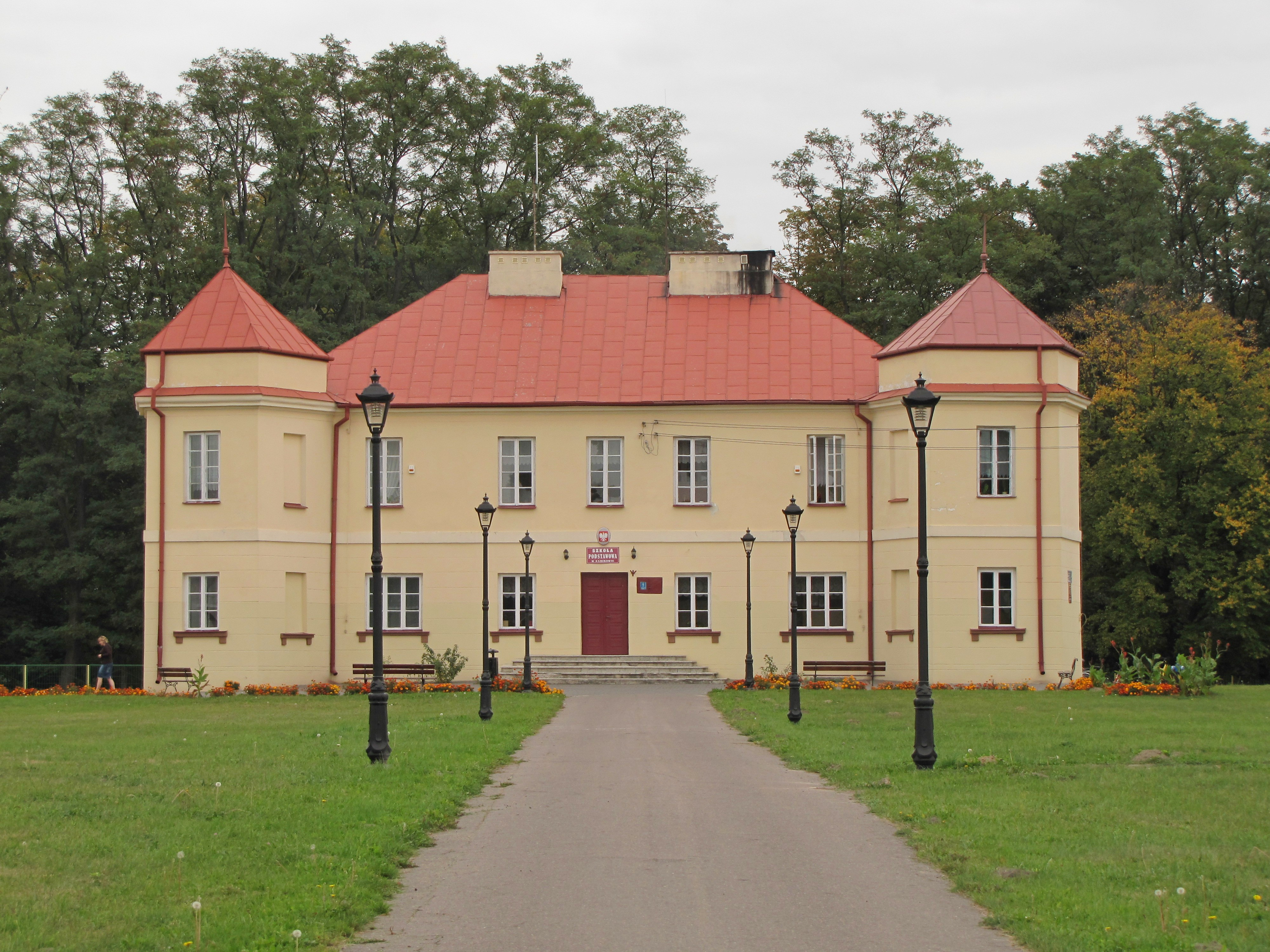

- Location within Poland
- Coordinates: 51°48′N 22°34′E
- Country: Poland
- Voivodeship: Lublin
- County: Radzyń
- Gmina: Radzyń Podlaski

Żabików [ʐaˈbikuf] is a village in the administrative district of Gmina Radzyń Podlaski, within Radzyń County, Lublin Voivodeship, in eastern Poland.
