= Niewęgłosz =

- Village
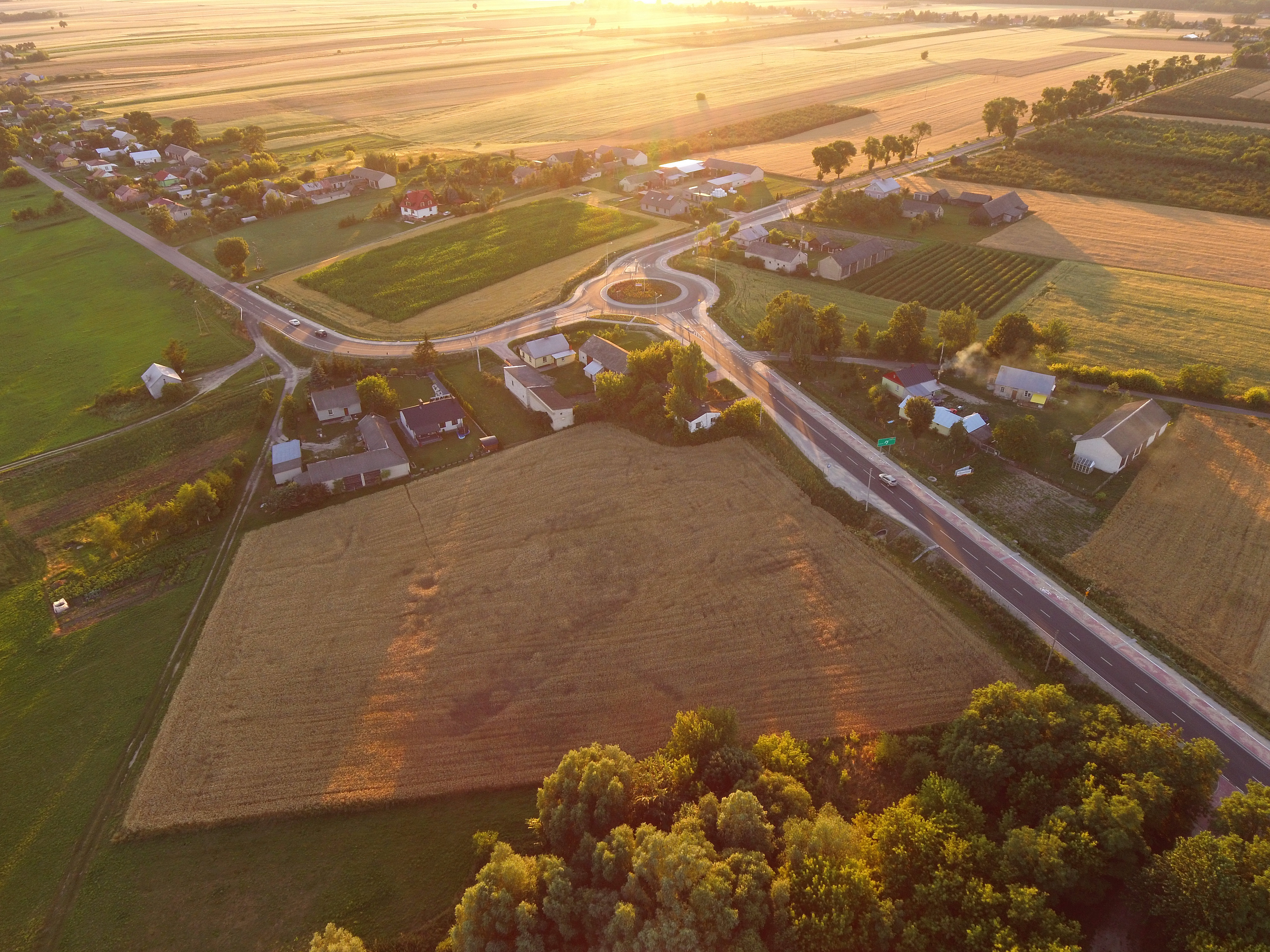
- Aerial view

- Location within Poland
- Coordinates: 51°43′N 22°38′E
- Country: Poland
- Voivodeship: Lublin
- County: Radzyń
- Gmina: Czemierniki
- Elevation: 200 m (660 ft)

Population
  - Total: 480

Niewęgłosz [ɲɛˈvɛŋɡwɔʂ] is a village in the administrative district of Gmina Czemierniki, within Radzyń County, Lublin Voivodeship, in eastern Poland.
