= Łózki =

- Village
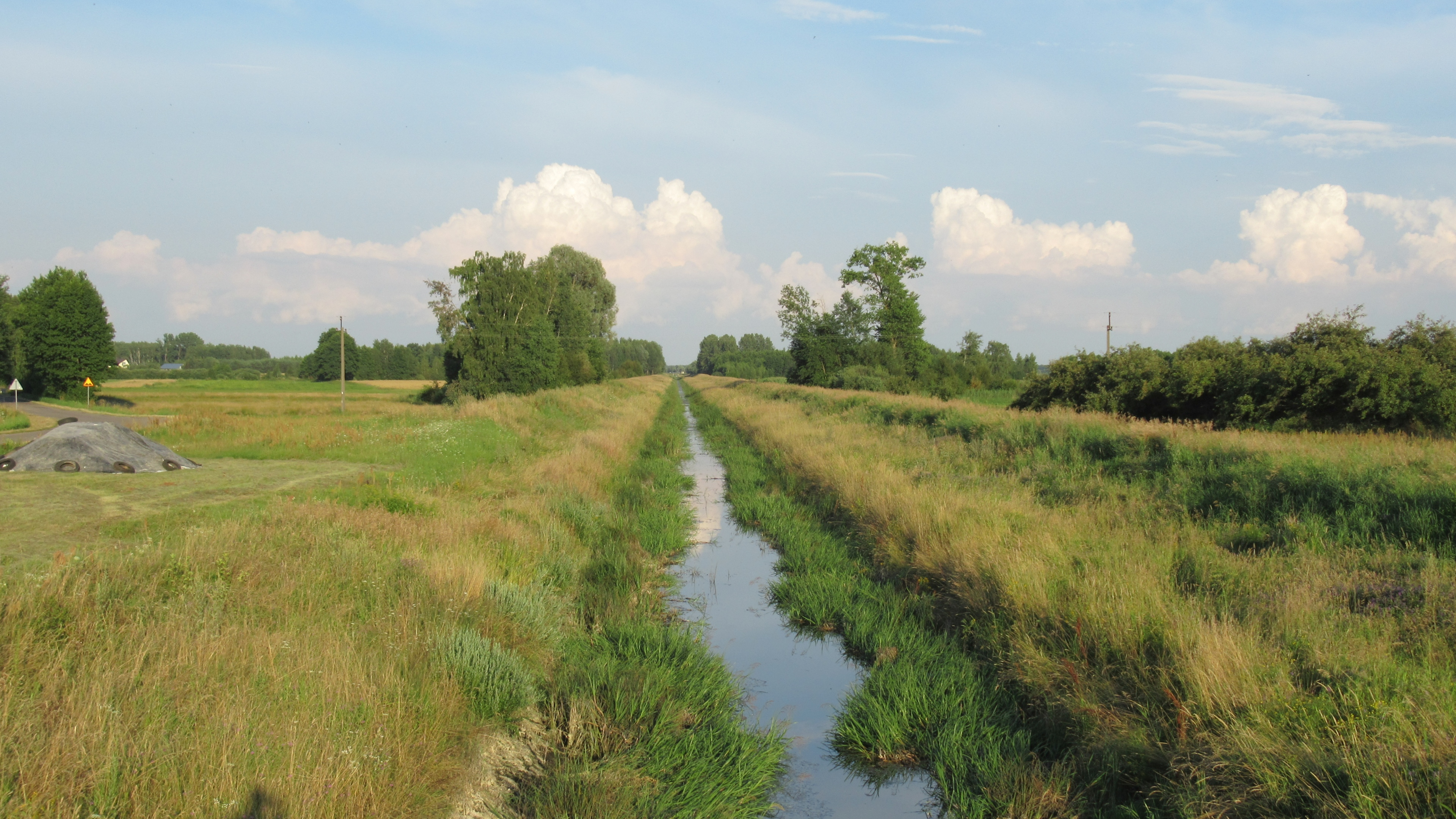

- Location within Poland
- Coordinates: 51°53′N 22°52′E
- Country: Poland
- Voivodeship: Lublin
- County: Biała
- Gmina: Drelów
- Time zone: UTC+1 (CET)
  - Summer (DST): UTC+2 (CEST)

Łózki [ˈwuskʲi] is a village in the administrative district of Gmina Drelów, within Biała County, Lublin Voivodeship, in eastern Poland.

== History ==
16 Polish citizens were murdered by Nazi Germany in the village during World War II.
