= Stanówka (river) =

Location
- Country: Poland

Physical characteristics
- Mouth
  - location: Bystrzyca
  - coordinates: 51°48′14″N 22°28′35″E

Basin features
- Progression: Bystrzyca→ Tyśmienica→ Wieprz→ Vistula→ Baltic Sea

Stanówka is a small river of Poland, a tributary of the Bystrzyca at Ulan-Majorat.
