= Gmina Czemierniki =

Gmina Czemierniki Czemierniki Commune
- Gmina
- Flag Coat of arms

- Location within Poland Location within Europe
- Coordinates (Czemierniki): 51°40′23″N 22°37′54″E
- Country: Poland
- Voivodeship: Lublin
- County: Radzyń
- Seat: Czemierniki

Area
  - Total: 107.71 km^{2} (41.59 sq mi)

Population (2006)
  - Total: 4,648
  - Density: 43.15/km^{2} (111.8/sq mi)

Gmina Czemierniki is a rural gmina (administrative district) in Radzyń County, Lublin Voivodeship, in eastern Poland. Its seat is the village of Czemierniki, which lies approximately 13 kilometres (8 mi) south of Radzyń Podlaski and 48 km (30 mi) north of the regional capital Lublin.

The gmina covers an area of 107.71 square kilometres (41.6 sq mi), and as of 2006 its total population is 4,648.

== Villages ==
Gmina Czemierniki contains the villages and settlements of Bełcząc, Czemierniki, Lichty, Niewęgłosz, Skoki, Stoczek, Stójka and Wygnanów.

== Neighbouring gminas ==
Gmina Czemierniki is bordered by the town of Radzyń Podlaski and by the gminas of Borki, Ostrówek, Radzyń Podlaski, Siemień and Wohyń.
