= Witoroż =

- Village
- Location within Poland
- Coordinates: 51°56′N 23°0′E
- Country: Poland
- Voivodeship: Lublin
- County: Biała
- Gmina: Drelów

Witoroż [vʲiˈtɔrɔʂ] is a village in the administrative district of Gmina Drelów, within Biała County, Lublin Voivodeship, in eastern Poland.
