= Strzyżówka =

- Village
- Location within Poland
- Coordinates: 51°56′N 22°58′E
- Country: Poland
- Voivodeship: Lublin
- County: Biała
- Gmina: Drelów
- Time zone: UTC+1 (CET)
  - Summer (DST): UTC+2 (CEST)

Strzyżówka [stʂɨˈʐufka] is a village in the administrative district of Gmina Drelów, within Biała County, Lublin Voivodeship, in eastern Poland.

== History ==
Five Polish citizens were murdered by Nazi Germany in the village during World War II.
