= Gmina Drelów =

Gmina Drelów Drelów Commune
- Gmina
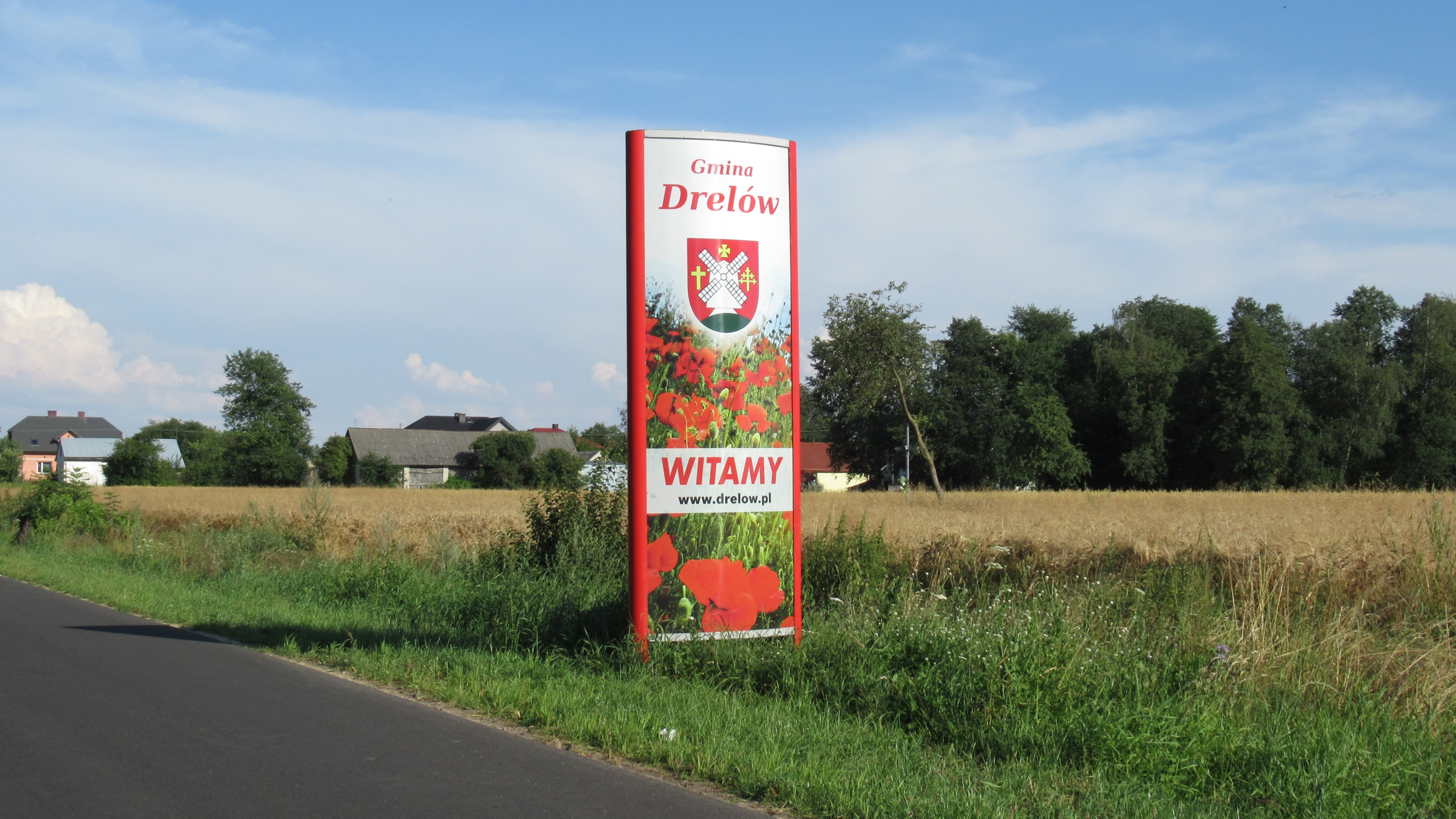

- Flag Coat of arms

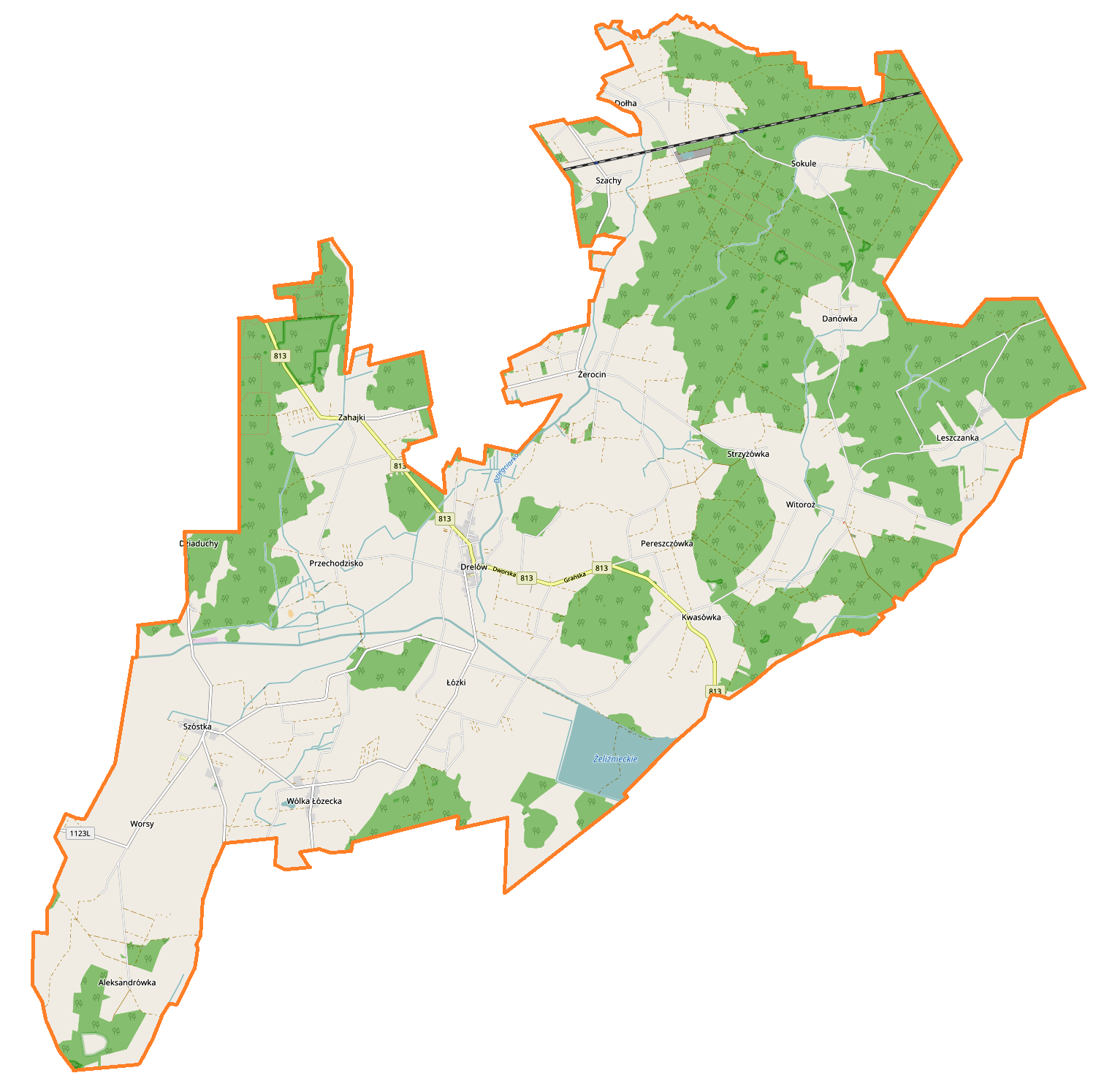

- Location within Poland
- Coordinates (Drelów): 51°55′N 22°53′E
- Country: Poland
- Voivodeship: Lublin
- County: Biała County
- Seat: Drelów

Area
  - Total: 228.03 km^{2} (88.04 sq mi)

Population (2014)
  - Total: 5,499
  - Density: 24.12/km^{2} (62.46/sq mi)
- Website: www.drelow.pl

Gmina Drelów is a rural gmina (administrative district) in Biała County, Lublin Voivodeship, in eastern Poland. Its seat is the village of Drelów, which lies approximately 21 kilometres (13 mi) south-west of Biała Podlaska and 78 km (48 mi) north of the regional capital Lublin.

The gmina covers an area of 228.03 square kilometres (88.0 sq mi), and as of 2006 its total population is 5,535 (5,499 in 2014).

Drelów was the site of the discovery of the first known shard of chondrite Drelów, named after the gmina.

== Villages ==
Gmina Drelów contains the villages and settlements of:

- Aleksandrówka
- Danówka
- Dołha
- Drelów
- Kwasówka
- Leszczanka
- Łózki
- Pereszczówka
- Przechodzisko
- Sokule
- Strzyżówka
- Szachy
- Szóstka
- Witoroż
- Wólka Łózecka
- Worsy
- Zahajki
- Żerocin

== Neighbouring gminas ==
Gmina Drelów is bordered by the town of Międzyrzec Podlaski and by the gminas of Biała Podlaska, Kąkolewnica Wschodnia, Komarówka Podlaska, Łomazy, Międzyrzec Podlaski, Radzyń Podlaski, and Wohyń.
