= Kwasówka, Lublin Voivodeship =

Kwasówka
- Village
- Location within Poland
- Coordinates: 51°54′N 22°56′E
- Country: Poland
- Voivodeship: Lublin
- County: Biała
- Gmina: Drelów

Kwasówka [kfaˈsufka] is a village in the administrative district of Gmina Drelów, within Biała County, Lublin Voivodeship, in eastern Poland.
