= Leszczanka, Gmina Drelów =

Leszczanka
- Village
- Location within Poland
- Coordinates: 51°54′35″N 22°57′53″E
- Country: Poland
- Voivodeship: Lublin
- County: Biała
- Gmina: Drelów

Leszczanka [lɛʂˈt͡ʂanka] is a village in the administrative district of Gmina Drelów, within Biała County, Lublin Voivodeship, in eastern Poland.
