= Stójka, Lublin Voivodeship =

Stójka
- Village
- Location within Poland
- Coordinates: 51°38′N 22°39′E
- Country: Poland
- Voivodeship: Lublin
- County: Radzyń
- Gmina: Czemierniki

Stójka [ˈstui̯ka] is a village in the administrative district of Gmina Czemierniki, within Radzyń County, Lublin Voivodeship, in eastern Poland.
