= Gmina Borki =

Gmina Borki Borki Commune
- Gmina
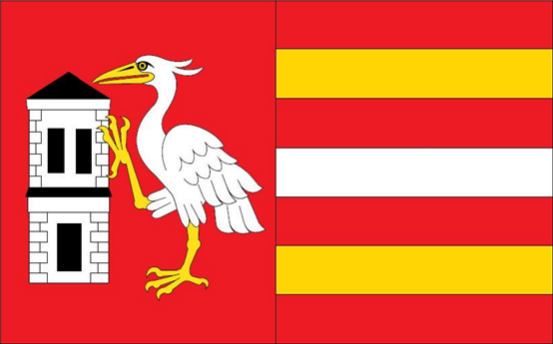
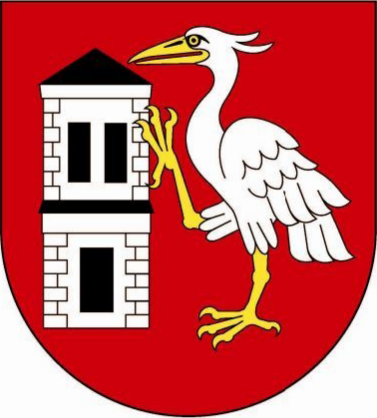
- Flag Coat of arms
- Interactive map of Gmina Borki
- Coordinates (Borki): 51°43′15″N 22°31′25″E
- Country: Poland
- Voivodeship: Lublin
- County: Radzyń
- Seat: Borki

Area
  - Total: 111.83 km^{2} (43.18 sq mi)

Population (2006)
  - Total: 6,166
  - Density: 55.14/km^{2} (142.8/sq mi)
- Website: https://www.gminaborki.pl/

Gmina Borki is a rural gmina (administrative district) in Radzyń County, Lublin Voivodeship, in eastern Poland. Its seat is the village of Borki, which lies approximately 10 kilometres (6 mi) south-west of Radzyń Podlaski and 53 km (33 mi) north of the regional capital Lublin.

The gmina covers an area of 111.83 square kilometres (43.2 sq mi), and as of 2006 its total population is 6,166.

== Villages ==
Gmina Borki contains the villages and settlements of Borki, Krasew, Maruszewiec, Nowiny, Olszewnica, Osowno, Pasmugi, Sitno, Stara Wieś, Tchórzew, Tchórzew-Kolonia, Wola Chomejowa, Wola Osowińska, Wola Osowińska-Kolonia and Wrzosów.

== Neighbouring gminas ==
Gmina Borki is bordered by the gminas of Czemierniki, Kock, Radzyń Podlaski, Ulan-Majorat and Wojcieszków.
