= Danówka =

- Village
- Location within Poland
- Coordinates: 51°58′N 22°59′E
- Country: Poland
- Voivodeship: Lublin
- County: Biała
- Gmina: Drelów

Danówka [daˈnufka] is a village in the administrative district of Gmina Drelów, within Biała County, Lublin Voivodeship, in eastern Poland.
