= Tchórzew, Lublin Voivodeship =

Tchórzew
- Village
- Location within Poland
- Coordinates: 51°41′N 22°33′E
- Country: Poland
- Voivodeship: Lublin
- County: Radzyń
- Gmina: Borki

Tchórzew [ˈtxuʐɛf] is a village in the administrative district of Gmina Borki, within Radzyń County, Lublin Voivodeship, in eastern Poland.
