= Wólka Łózecka =

- Village
- Location within Poland
- Coordinates: 51°52′00″N 22°49′11″E
- Country: Poland
- Voivodeship: Lublin
- County: Biała
- Gmina: Drelów

Wólka Łózecka [ˈvulka wuˈzɛt͡ska] is a village in the administrative district of Gmina Drelów, within Biała County, Lublin Voivodeship, in eastern Poland.
