= Zahajki, Gmina Drelów =

Zahajki
- Village
- Location within Poland
- Coordinates: 51°56′N 22°49′E
- Country: Poland
- Voivodeship: Lublin
- County: Biała
- Gmina: Drelów

Zahajki [zaˈxai̯kʲi] is a village in the administrative district of Gmina Drelów, within Biała County, Lublin Voivodeship, in eastern Poland.
