= Tchórzew-Kolonia =

- Village
- Location within Poland
- Coordinates: 51°40′8″N 22°32′1″E
- Country: Poland
- Voivodeship: Lublin
- County: Radzyń
- Gmina: Borki
- Population: 800

Tchórzew-Kolonia [ˈtxuʐɛf kɔˈlɔɲa] is a village in the administrative district of Gmina Borki, within Radzyń County, Lublin Voivodeship, in eastern Poland.
