= Szachy, Lublin Voivodeship =

Szachy
- Village
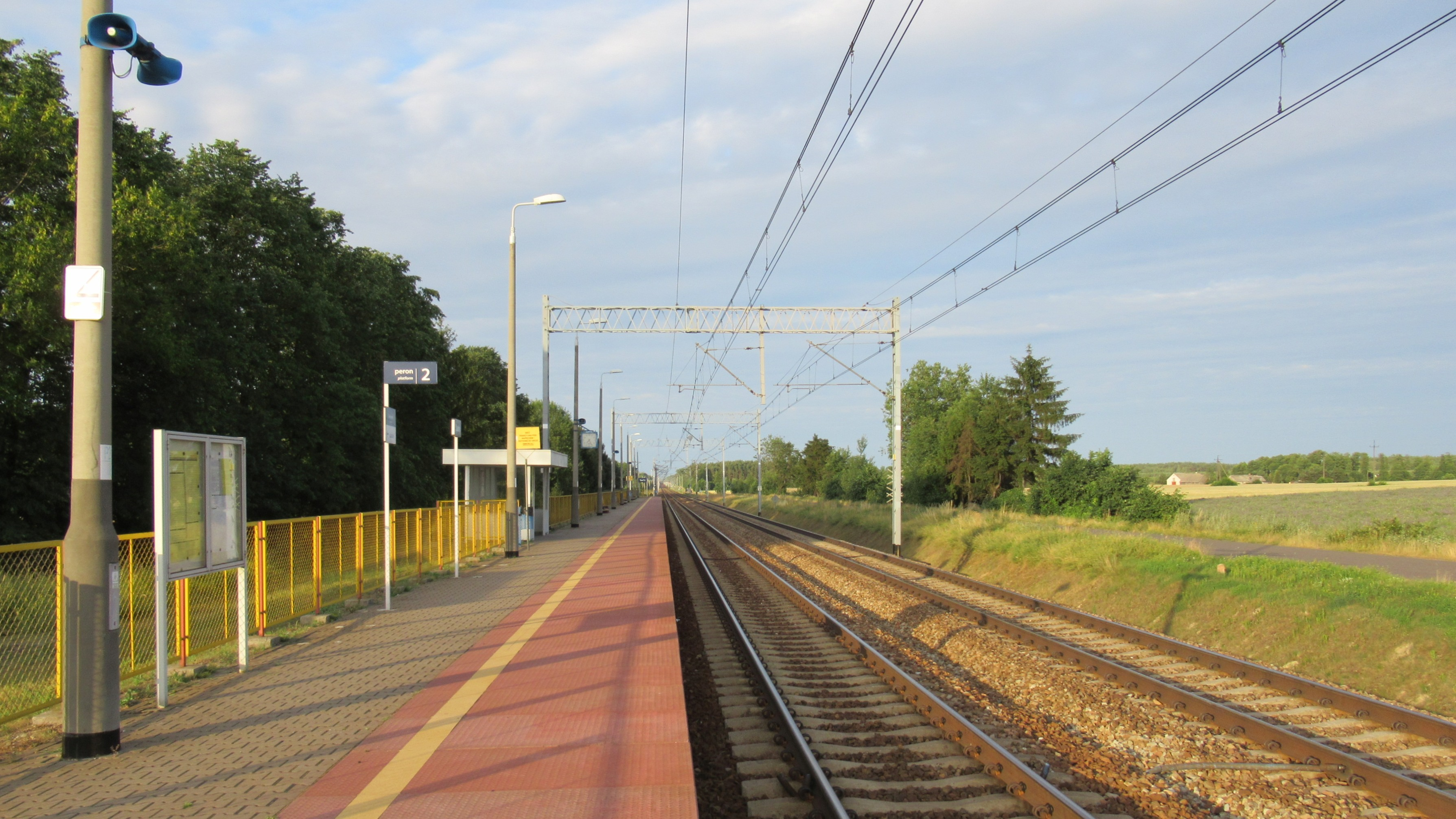
- Szachy railway station

- Location within Poland
- Coordinates: 51°59′N 22°55′E
- Country: Poland
- Voivodeship: Lublin
- County: Biała
- Gmina: Drelów
- Time zone: UTC+1 (CET)
  - Summer (DST): UTC+2 (CEST)

Szachy [ˈʂaxɨ] is a village in the administrative district of Gmina Drelów, within Biała County, Lublin Voivodeship, in eastern Poland.

== History ==
Three Polish citizens were murdered by Nazi Germany in the village during World War II.
