= Ulan-Majorat =

- Village
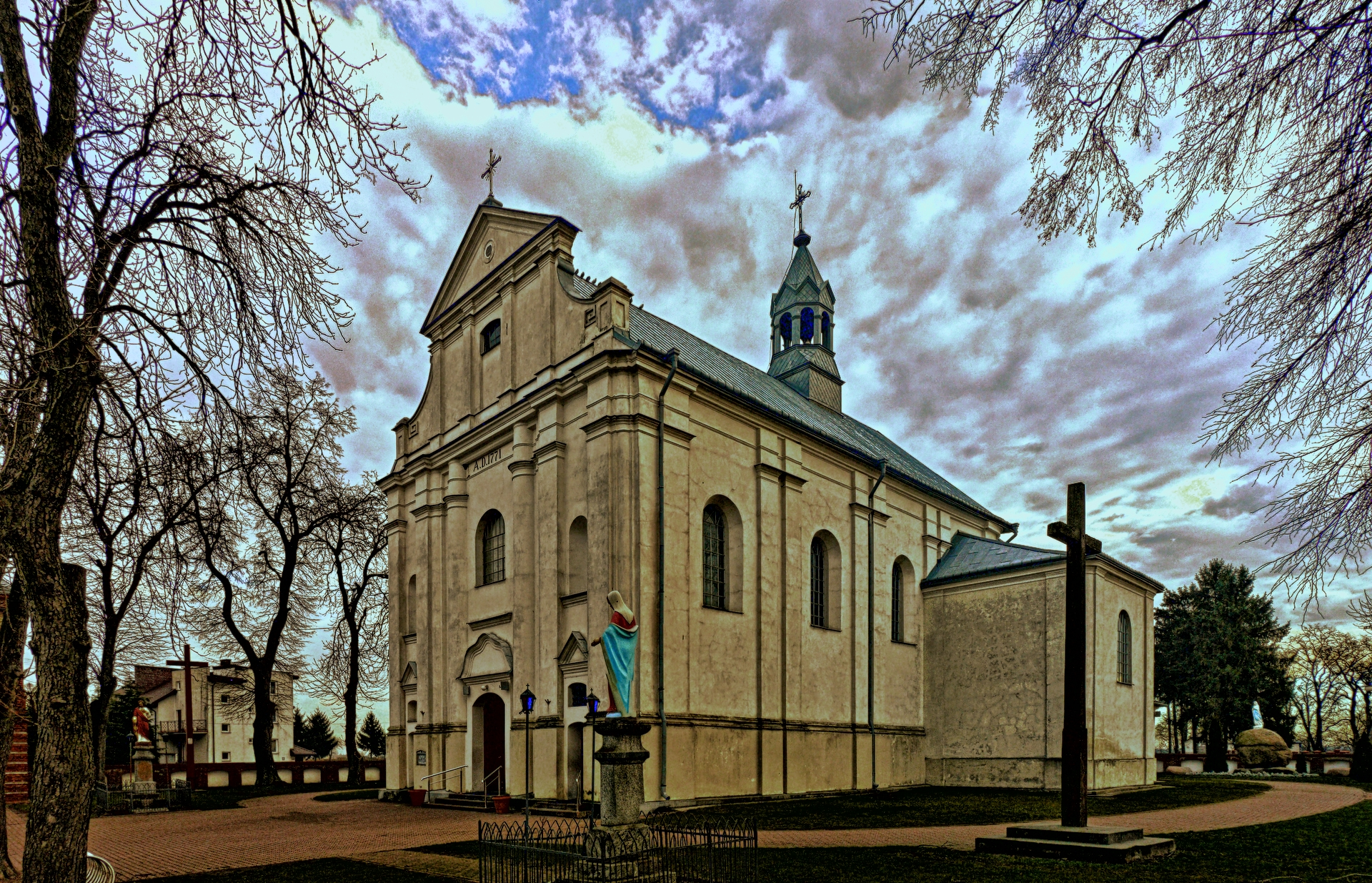
- Church of Saint Margaret

- Location within Poland
- Coordinates: 51°48′N 22°29′E
- Country: Poland
- Voivodeship: Lublin
- County: Radzyń
- Gmina: Ulan-Majorat

Ulan-Majorat [ˈulan maˈjɔrat] is a village in Radzyń County, Lublin Voivodeship, in eastern Poland. It is the seat of the gmina (administrative district) called Gmina Ulan-Majorat.

== Geography ==
- Stanówka (river)
