= Gmina Radzyń Podlaski =

Gmina Radzyń Podlaski Radzyń Podlaski Commune
- Gmina
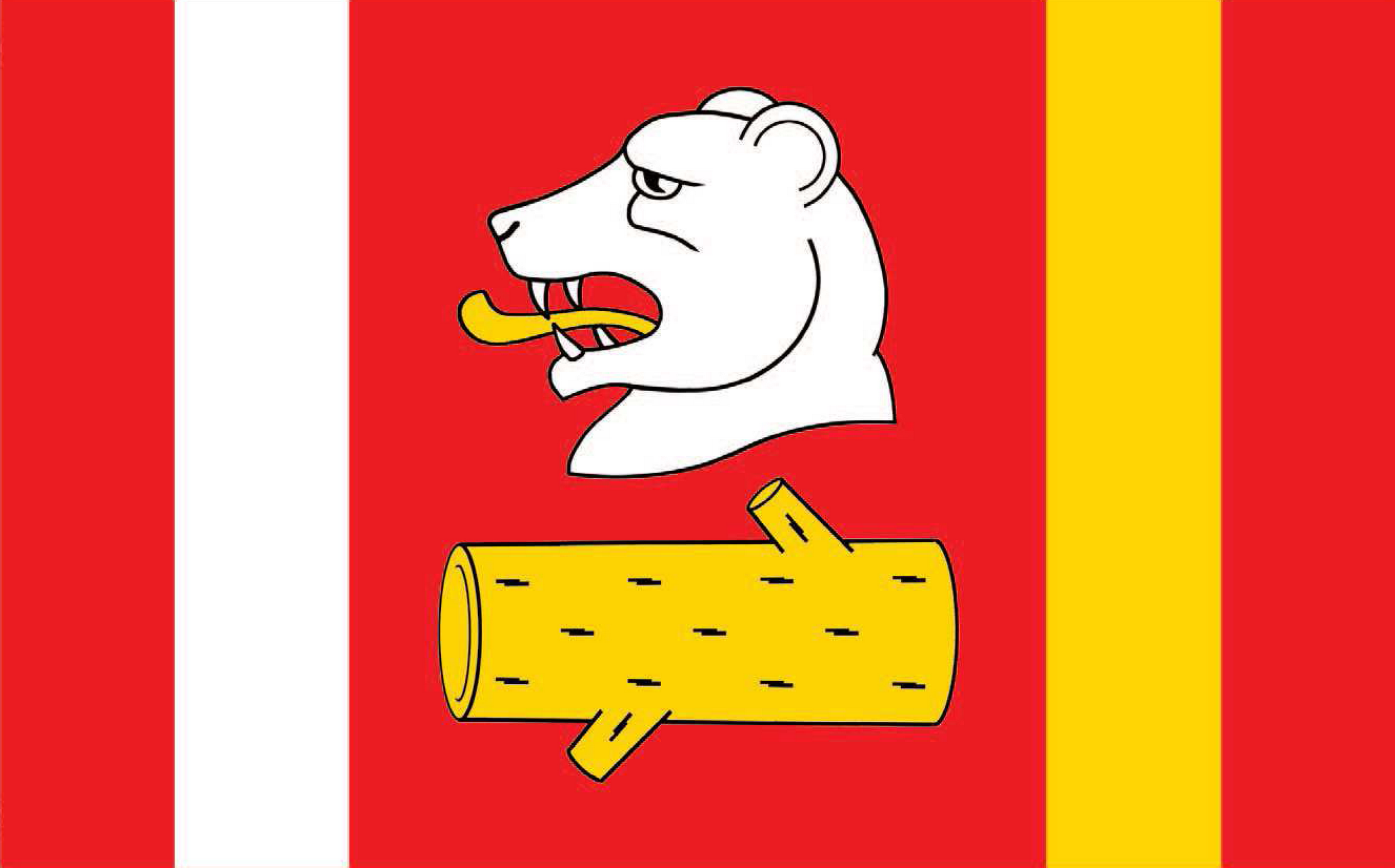
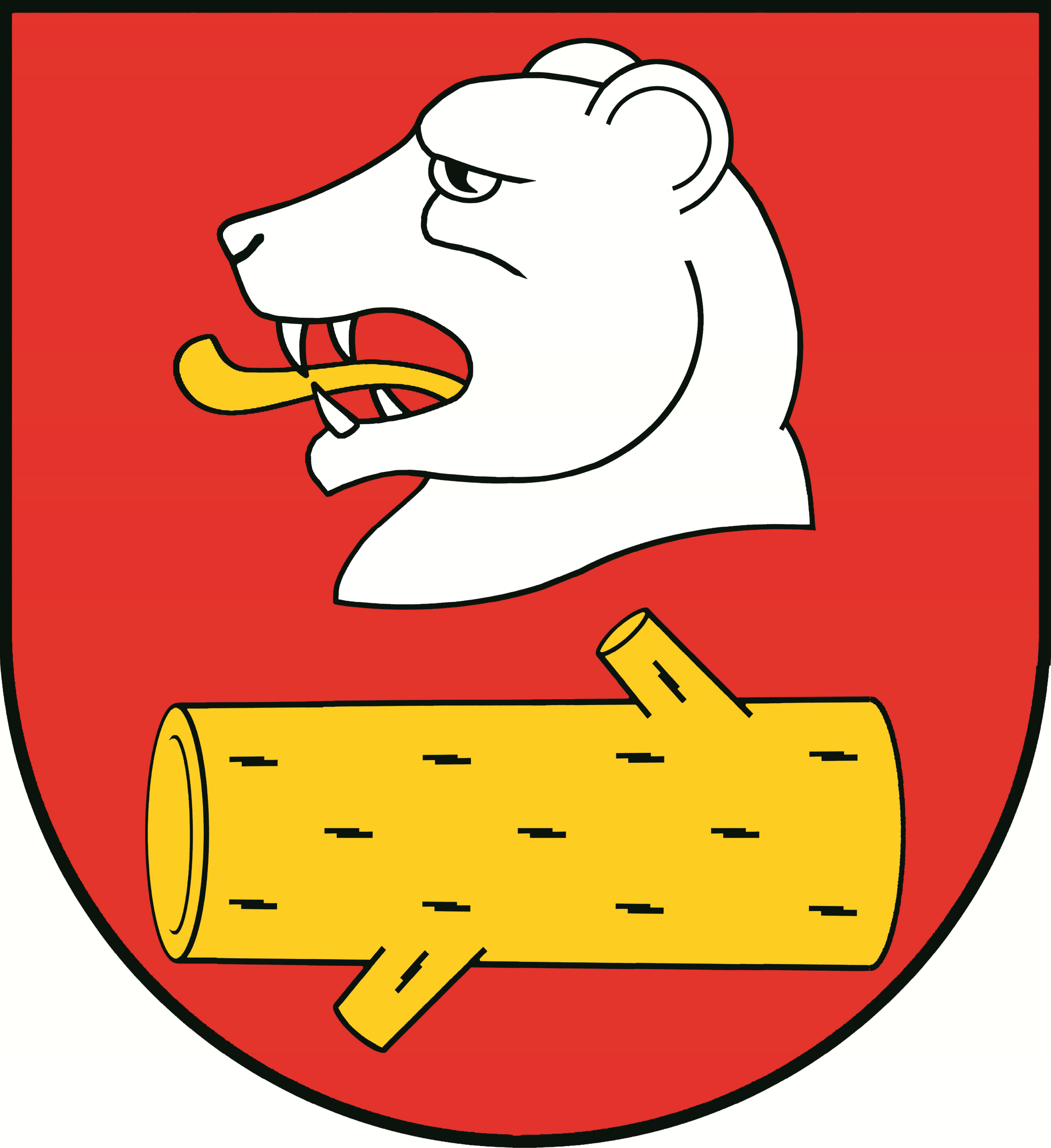
- Flag Coat of arms
- Interactive map of Gmina Radzyń Podlaski
- Coordinates (Radzyń Podlaski): 51°46′58″N 22°37′27″E
- Country: Poland
- Voivodeship: Lublin
- County: Radzyń
- Seat: Radzyń Podlaski

Area
  - Total: 155.17 km^{2} (59.91 sq mi)

Population (2006)
  - Total: 8,028
  - Density: 51.74/km^{2} (134.0/sq mi)
- Website: http://www.radzynpodlaski.pl/

Gmina Radzyń Podlaski is a rural gmina (administrative district) in Radzyń County, Lublin Voivodeship, in eastern Poland. Its seat is the town of Radzyń Podlaski, although the town is not part of the territory of the gmina.

The gmina covers an area of 155.17 square kilometres (59.9 sq mi), and as of 2006 its total population is 8,028.

== Villages ==
Gmina Radzyń Podlaski contains the villages and settlements of Bedlno, Bedlno Radzyńskie, Biała, Białka, Branica Radzyńska, Branica Radzyńska-Kolonia, Brzostówiec, Główne, Jaski, Marynin, Paszki Duże, Paszki Małe, Płudy, Radowiec, Siedlanów, Stasinów, Ustrzesz, Zabiele, Żabików and Zbulitów Duży.

== Neighbouring gminas ==
Gmina Radzyń Podlaski is bordered by the town of Radzyń Podlaski and by the gminas of Borki, Czemierniki, Drelów, Kąkolewnica Wschodnia, Ulan-Majorat and Wohyń.
