= Branica Radzyńska =

- Village
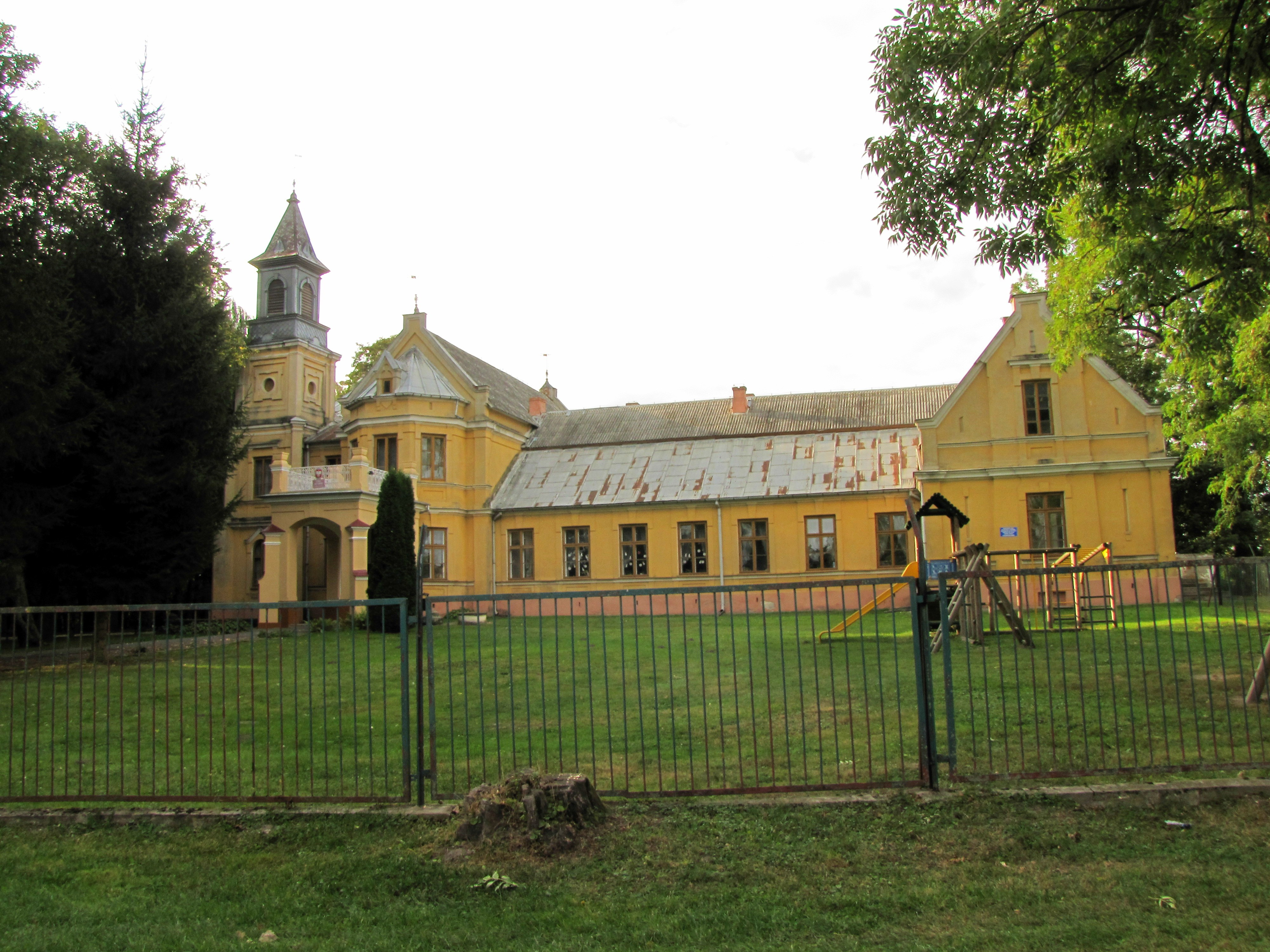
- Palace in Branica Radzyńska

- Location within Poland
- Coordinates: 51°44′36″N 22°41′54″E
- Country: Poland
- Voivodeship: Lublin
- County: Radzyń
- Gmina: Radzyń Podlaski

Population
  - Total: 250

Branica Radzyńska [braˈnit͡sa raˈd͡zɨɲska] is a village in the administrative district of Gmina Radzyń Podlaski, within Radzyń County, Lublin Voivodeship, in eastern Poland.
