= Worsy =

- Village
- Location within Poland
- Coordinates: 51°51′N 22°46′E
- Country: Poland
- Voivodeship: Lublin
- County: Biała
- Gmina: Drelów

Worsy [ˈvɔrsɨ] is a village in the administrative district of Gmina Drelów, within Biała County, Lublin Voivodeship, in eastern Poland.
