= Przegaliny Duże =

- Village
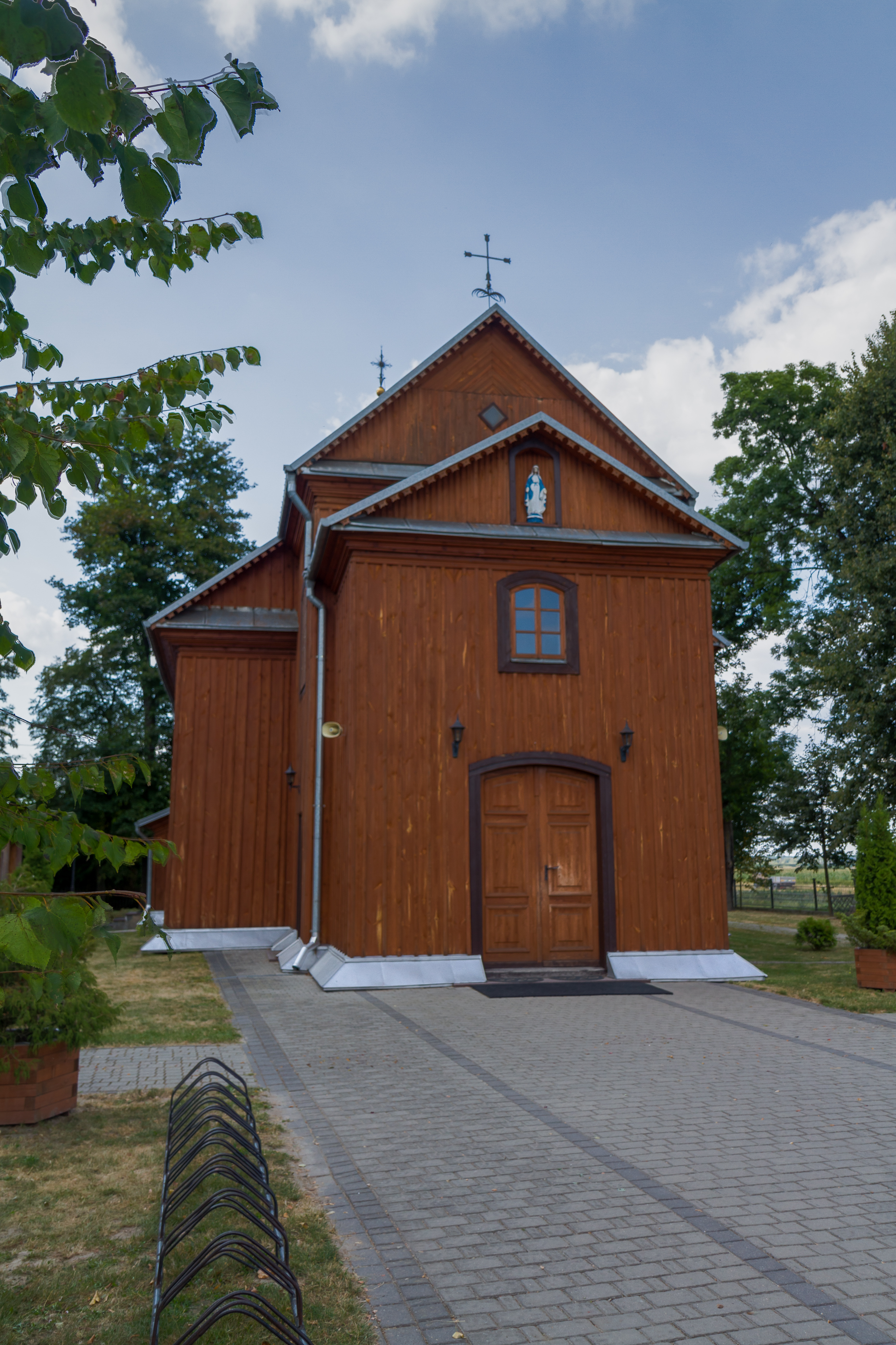
- Church in Przegaliny Duże

- Location within Poland
- Coordinates: 51°49′55″N 22°52′57″E
- Country: Poland
- Voivodeship: Lublin
- County: Radzyń
- Gmina: Komarówka Podlaska

Population
  - Total: 557
- Time zone: UTC+1 (CET)
  - Summer (DST): UTC+2 (CEST)

Przegaliny Duże [pʂɛɡaˈlinɨ ˈduʐɛ] is a village in the administrative district of Gmina Komarówka Podlaska, within Radzyń County, Lublin Voivodeship, in eastern Poland.

== History ==
12 Polish citizens were murdered by Nazi Germany in the village during World War II.
