= Gmina Ulan-Majorat =

Gmina Ulan-Majorat Ulan-Majorat Commune
- Gmina
- Flag Coat of arms
- Interactive map of Gmina Ulan-Majorat
- Coordinates (Ulan-Majorat): 51°48′N 22°29′E
- Country: Poland
- Voivodeship: Lublin
- County: Radzyń
- Seat: Ulan-Majorat

Area
  - Total: 107.77 km^{2} (41.61 sq mi)

Population (2006)
  - Total: 6,062
  - Density: 56.25/km^{2} (145.7/sq mi)

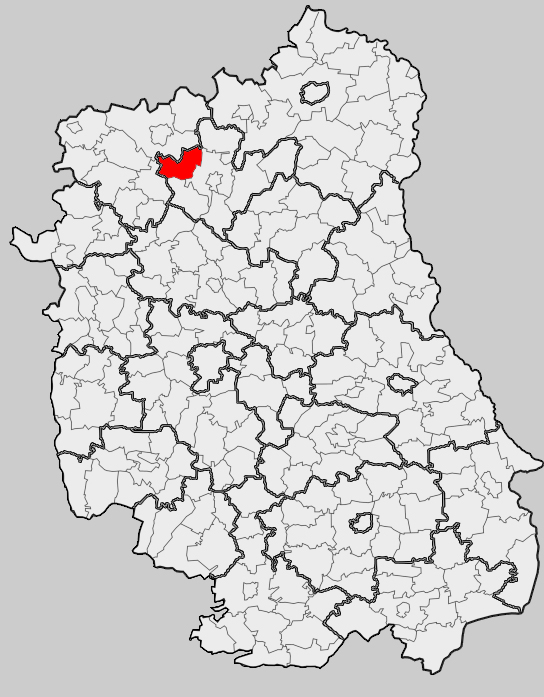
Map of gmina Ulan-Majorat

Gmina Ulan-Majorat is a rural gmina (administrative district) in Radzyń County, Lublin Voivodeship, in eastern Poland. Its seat is the village of Ulan-Majorat, which lies approximately 10 kilometres (6 mi) west of Radzyń Podlaski and 62 km (39 mi) north of the regional capital Lublin.

The gmina covers an area of 107.77 square kilometres (41.6 sq mi), and as of 2006 its total population is 6,062.

== Villages ==
Gmina Ulan-Majorat contains the villages and settlements of Domaszewnica, Gąsiory, Kępki, Klębów, Kolonia Domaszewnica, Kolonia Domaszewska, Paskudy, Rozwadów, Sętki, Skrzyszew, Sobole, Stanisławów, Stok, Ulan Duży, Ulan Mały, Ulan-Majorat, Wierzchowiny, Zakrzew, Zarzec Ulański and Żyłki.

== Neighbouring gminas ==
Gmina Ulan-Majorat is bordered by the gminas of Borki, Kąkolewnica Wschodnia, Łuków, Radzyń Podlaski and Wojcieszków.
