= Drelów =

- Village
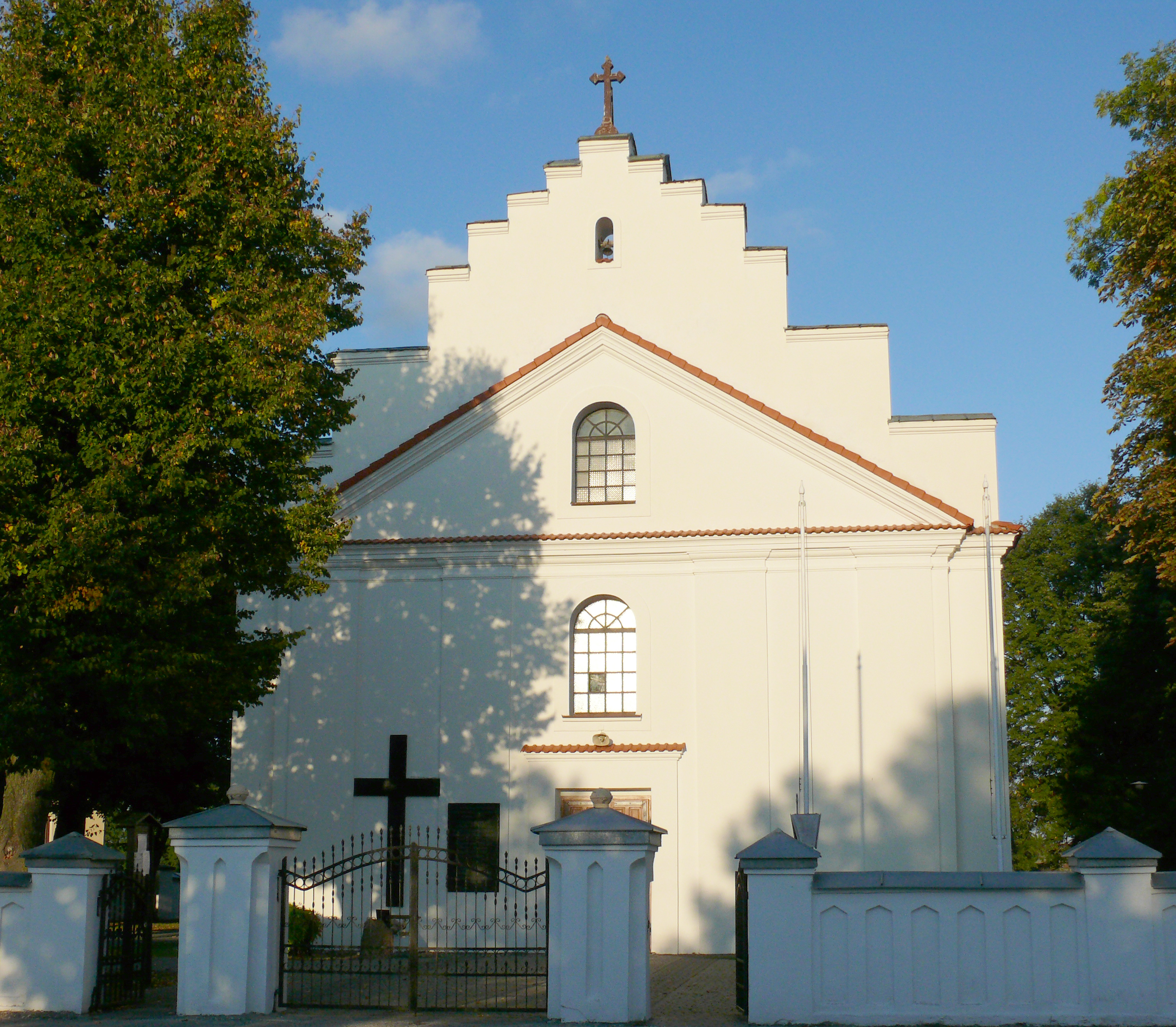
- Church of the Immaculate Conception of the Blessed Virgin Mary

- Location within Poland
- Coordinates: 51°55′N 22°53′E
- Country: Poland
- Voivodeship: Lublin
- County: Biała
- Gmina: Drelów

Population
  - Total: 900

Drelów [ˈdrɛluf] is a village in Biała County, Lublin Voivodeship, in eastern Poland. It is the seat of the gmina (administrative district) called Gmina Drelów.

On 17 January 1874 the Russian Army killed 23 Greek Catholics (Uniates) who were protesting against the Russification and confiscation of the church.

== Notable people ==
- Franciszek Stefaniuk, Polish politician

== See also ==
- Pratulin Martyrs
