= Czemierniki =

- Town
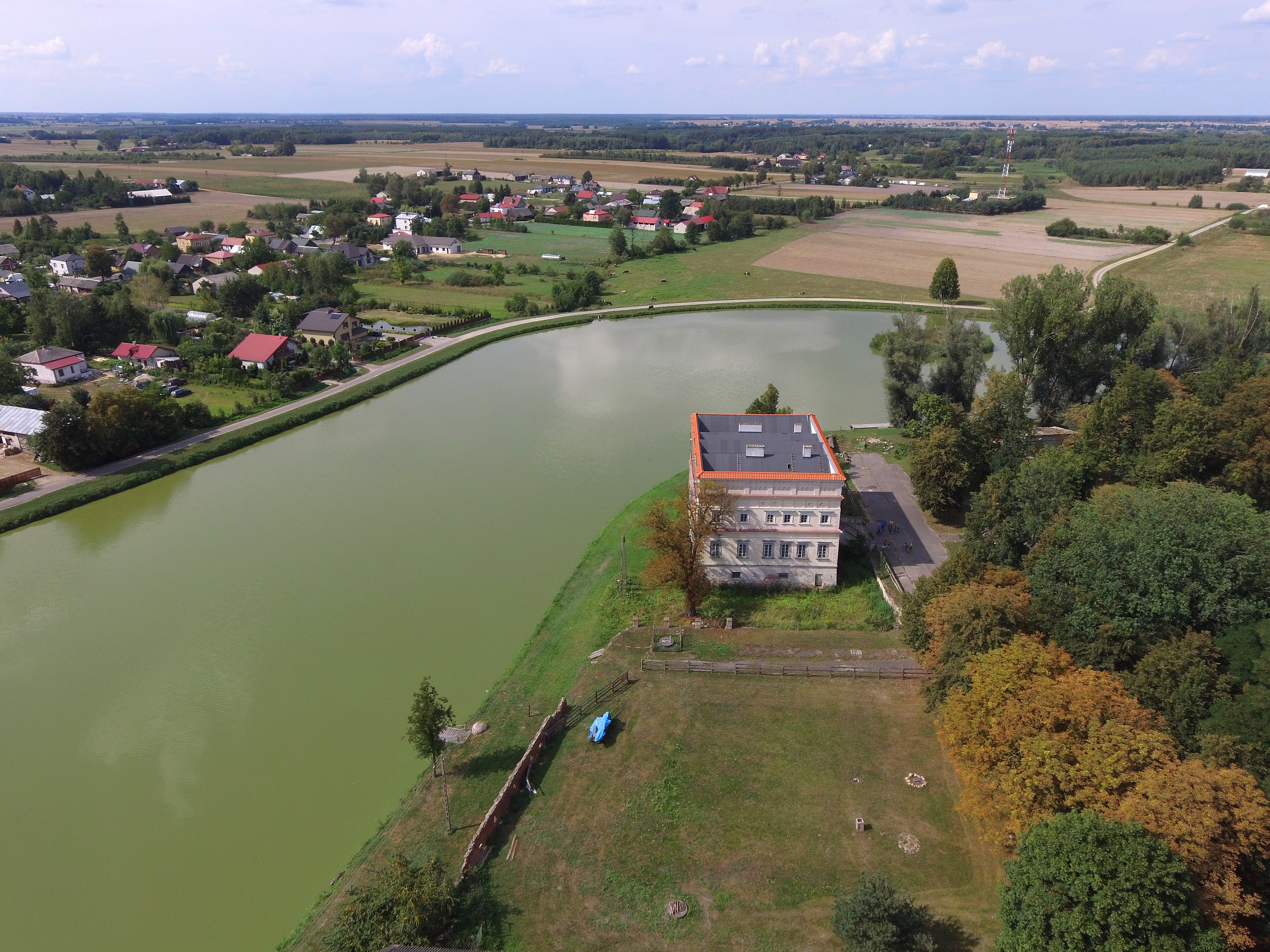
- Palace and park complex in Czemierniki

- Coat of arms

- Location within Poland
- Coordinates: 51°40′23″N 22°37′54″E
- Country: Poland
- Voivodeship: Lublin
- County: Radzyń
- Gmina: Czemierniki
- Town rights: 1509
- Elevation: 144 m (472 ft)

Population (2010)
  - Total: 3,700
- Time zone: UTC+1 (CET)
  - Summer (DST): UTC+2 (CEST)
- Area code: (+48) 83
- Vehicle registration: LRA

Czemierniki [t͡ʂɛmjɛrˈniki] is a town in Radzyń County, Lublin Voivodeship, in eastern Poland. It is the seat of the gmina (administrative district) called Gmina Czemierniki.

== History ==
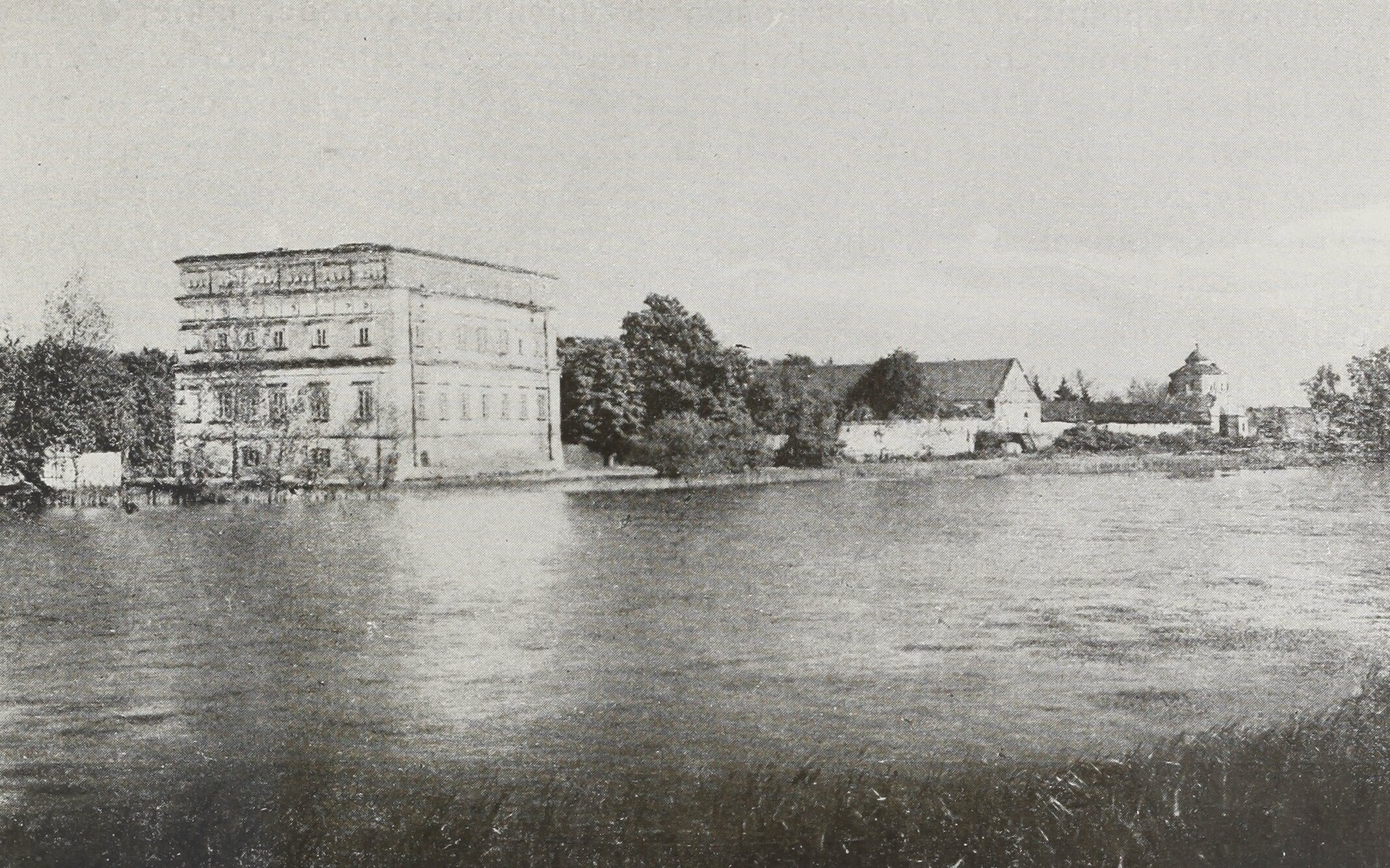
Czemierniki Palace in 1930

Czemierniki was granted town rights in 1509 by King Sigismund I the Old thanks to efforts of heir Mikołaj Firlej. In 1622, Bishop of Płock Henryk Firlej erected a palace with adjacent gardens, thanks to which, according to the 19th-century Geographical Dictionary of the Kingdom of Poland, Czemierniki was "famous as one of the most beautiful towns in Poland". In 1624, King Sigismund III Vasa and the Royal Court stayed in Czemierniki, when Kraków was hit by an epidemic.

According to the 1921 census, the population of Czemierniki with the adjacent manor farm was 2,560, 61.4% Polish and 38.6% Jewish.

Following the joint German-Soviet invasion of Poland, which started World War II in September 1939, the town was occupied by Germany. Around 1,000 Jews were put into the Czemierniki ghetto, established by the Nazis in 1940. In 1942, Czemierniki Jews were sent to the Parczew ghetto, and then to the Treblinka concentration camp. Few Jews survived.

Czemierniki regained town rights on 1 January 2024.
