= Branica Radzyńska-Kolonia =

- Village
- Location within Poland
- Coordinates: 51°45′8″N 22°40′21″E
- Country: Poland
- Voivodeship: Lublin
- County: Radzyń
- Gmina: Radzyń Podlaski

Branica Radzyńska-Kolonia [braˈnit͡sa raˈd͡zɨɲska kɔˈlɔɲa] is a village in the administrative district of Gmina Radzyń Podlaski, within Radzyń County, Lublin Voivodeship, in eastern Poland.
