= Bedlno Radzyńskie =

- Village
- Location within Poland
- Coordinates: 51°49′16″N 22°40′26″E
- Country: Poland
- Voivodeship: Lublin
- County: Radzyń
- Gmina: Radzyń Podlaski

Bedlno Radzyńskie [ˈbɛdlnɔ raˈd͡zɨɲskʲɛ] is a village in the administrative district of Gmina Radzyń Podlaski, within Radzyń County, Lublin Voivodeship, in eastern Poland.
