= Aleksandrówka, Gmina Drelów =

Aleksandrówka
- Village
- Location within Poland
- Coordinates: 51°49′48″N 22°45′33″E
- Country: Poland
- Voivodeship: Lublin
- County: Biała
- Gmina: Drelów

Aleksandrówka [alɛksanˈdrufka] is a village in the administrative district of Gmina Drelów, within Biała County, Lublin Voivodeship, in eastern Poland.
