= Jasieńczyk coat of arms =

Polish coat of arms

Jasieńczyk
- Alternative names: Jasienice, Jasiona, Klucz
- Earliest mention: 1406
- Towns: none
- Families: 130 names altogether: Barcikowski, Barczykowski, Bardzikowski, Barzykowski, Bielski, Boski, Bosko, Branecki, Bucki, Burn, Burno, Burski, Burski, Buski, Busz, Cebrzyński, Chustka, Czeczerski, Ćwikła, Dobrohost, Ducki, Egintowicz, Falicki, Gaba, Gamba, Gąba, Gol, Grzegorzewski, Hanow, Hanowski, Hayno, Horoszko, Jabłonowski, Jabłoński, Janowski, Jasieńczyk, Jasieński, Jasinkowski, Jasiukowicz, Jasnogorski, Jasnogórski, Jaśkowski, Jenczyk, Kamionka, Karczewski, Klimowicz, Kluczeński, Kluczewicz, Kluczyński, Klukowski, Kluszewski, Kociszewski, Kokoszka, Kołbielski, Kołubielski, Kołubulski, Kołybielski, Konczewski, Kończewski, Korytkowski, Kowalski, Krajeszewicz, Krajewski, Królikiewicz, Krulikiewicz, Kwesewicz, Lichański, Lichnowski, Lichowski, Ludwikowski, Lychowski, Łabuzek, Łasicki, Łojewski, Łojowski, Łychowski, Małcużyński, Michałowski, Miedzechowski, Miedzichowski, Miedzychowski, Międzychowski, Mijakowski, Mikita, Montusz, Ochotnicki, Olsanowski, Olszamowski, Olszanowski, Ostaniecki, Ostoniecki, Ostowiecki, Pawłowicz, Pieczyfortski, Piotrkowski, Płoski, Przeracki, Przeradzki, Przybysławski, Przyradzki, Pstrąg, Pstrągowski, Radoński, Radowicki, Radowski, Radziński , Radzyński, Skorupa, Słuchocki, Słuchowski, Stocki, Strupiechowski, Szyryn, Szyryński, Śliwowski, Śliwski, Tworek, Warpechowski, Warpęchowski, Warpęs, Warpęsz, Worain, Woraiński, Worana, Zborski, Zbroiski, Zbroski, Zbrowski, Zbrożek, Zywolt, Żebrowski, Żegocki

Jasieńczyk is a Polish coat of arms. It was used by several szlachta families in the times of the Polish–Lithuanian Commonwealth.

== History ==
The first known use of these arms is dated 1406. Earliest version was Jasiona and had two keys in saltire. A bearer of this coat of arms was Chancellor of the Exchequer - Treasurer of Poland, and the history of these arms is presumed to be attributable to ecclesiastical iconography.

== Blazon ==
Azure a key or, the wards in chief.

== Notable bearers ==
Notable bearers of this coat of arms include:

- Witold Malkuzynski
- Gregg Jenczyk

== See also ==
- Polish heraldry
- Heraldry
- Coat of arms
