= Szóstka, Lublin Voivodeship =

Szóstka
- Village
- Location within Poland
- Coordinates: 51°53′N 22°47′E
- Country: Poland
- Voivodeship: Lublin
- County: Biała
- Gmina: Drelów

Szóstka [ˈʂustka] is a village in the administrative district of Gmina Drelów, within Biała County, Lublin Voivodeship, in eastern Poland.
