= Żerocin =

- Village
- Location within Poland
- Coordinates: 51°57′N 22°55′E
- Country: Poland
- Voivodeship: Lublin
- County: Biała
- Gmina: Drelów

Population
  - Total: 580

Żerocin [ʐɛˈrɔt͡ɕin] is a village in the administrative district of Gmina Drelów, within Biała County, Lublin Voivodeship, in eastern Poland. From 1975 to 1998 Żerocin was in the now defunct Biała Podlaska Voivodeship.
