= Gmina Komarówka Podlaska =

Gmina Komarówka Podlaska Komarówka Podlaska Commune
- Gmina
- Coat of arms
- Interactive map of Gmina Komarówka Podlaska
- Coordinates (Komarówka Podlaska): 51°48′12″N 22°56′36″E
- Country: Poland
- Voivodeship: Lublin
- County: Radzyń
- Seat: Komarówka Podlaska

Area
  - Total: 137.56 km^{2} (53.11 sq mi)

Population (2006)
  - Total: 4,728
  - Density: 34.37/km^{2} (89.02/sq mi)
- Website: https://www.komarowkapodlaska.pl/

Gmina Komarówka Podlaska is a rural gmina (administrative district) in Radzyń County, Lublin Voivodeship, in eastern Poland. Its seat is the village of Komarówka Podlaska, which lies approximately 23 kilometres (14 mi) east of Radzyń Podlaski and 67 km (42 mi) north-east of the regional capital Lublin.

The gmina covers an area of 137.56 square kilometres (53.1 sq mi), and as of 2006 its total population is 4,728.

== Villages ==
Gmina Komarówka Podlaska contains the villages and settlements of Brzeziny, Brzozowy Kąt, Derewiczna, Kolembrody, Komarówka Podlaska, Przegaliny Duże, Przegaliny Małe, Walinna, Wiski, Wólka Komarowska, Woroniec, Żelizna and Żulinki.

== Neighbouring gminas ==
Gmina Komarówka Podlaska is bordered by the gminas of Drelów, Łomazy, Milanów, Rossosz, Wisznice and Wohyń.
