= Komarówka Podlaska =

- Village
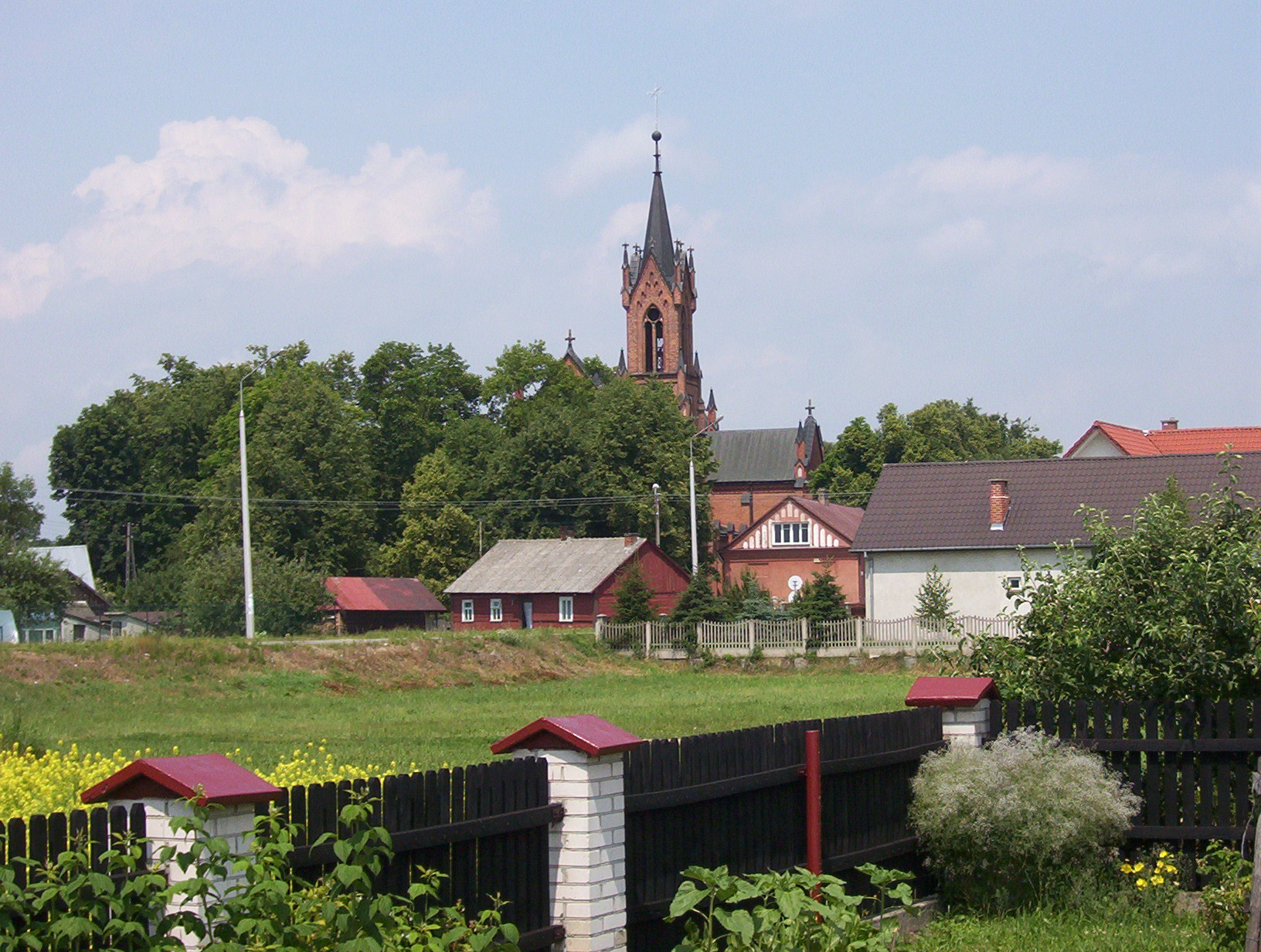
- Panorama of the village with the Church of the Sacred Heart

- Coat of arms

- Location within Poland
- Coordinates: 51°48′12″N 22°56′36″E
- Country: Poland
- Voivodeship: Lublin
- County: Radzyń
- Gmina: Komarówka Podlaska

Population
  - Total: 1,300
- Time zone: UTC+1 (CET)
  - Summer (DST): UTC+2 (CEST)

Komarówka Podlaska [kɔmaˈrufka pɔdˈlaska] is a village in Radzyń County, Lublin Voivodeship, in eastern Poland. It is the seat of the gmina (administrative district) called Gmina Komarówka Podlaska.

== History ==
13 Polish citizens were murdered by Nazi Germany in the village during World War II.

== Notable residents ==
- Dariusz Kowaluk (born 1996), sprinter, Olympic medallist
