= Sokule, Gmina Drelów =

Sokule
- Village
- Location within Poland
- Coordinates: 51°59′N 22°59′E
- Country: Poland
- Voivodeship: Lublin
- County: Biała
- Gmina: Drelów

Sokule [sɔˈkulɛ] is a village in the administrative district of Gmina Drelów, within Biała County, Lublin Voivodeship, in eastern Poland.
