= Borki, Radzyń County =

Borki
- Village
- Location within Poland
- Coordinates: 51°43′15″N 22°31′25″E
- Country: Poland
- Voivodeship: Lublin
- County: Radzyń
- Gmina: Borki

Borki [ˈbɔrki] is a village in Radzyń County, Lublin Voivodeship, in eastern Poland. It is the seat of the gmina (administrative district) called Gmina Borki.
