= Radziński =

Jasieńczyk coat of arms used by some of Radziński family

Radziński (feminine: Radzińska) is a Polish surname. Some of them use: Jasieńczyk or Poraj coat of arms. It may be transliterated as: Radzinski, Radzinska, Radzinsky, Ryadinsky. Notable people with the surname include:

- Alexander Ryadinsky (born 1978), Belarusian ice hockey player
- Anastasia Radzinskaya (born 2014), Russian-American YouTuber, Like Nastya
- Edvard Radzinsky (born 1936), Russian historian
- Jacek Radziński (born 1968), Polish actor and television presenter
- Jowin Radziński (born 2001), Polish footballer
- Paweł Radziński (born 1954), Polish violinist, professor of arts at Feliks Nowowiejski Music Academy
- Tomasz Radzinski (born 1973), Polish footballer with Canadian and Belgian passport
- Stuart Radzinsky, Lost (TV series) character
