= Radzyń County =

Radzyń County Powiat radzyński
- County
- Flag Coat of arms

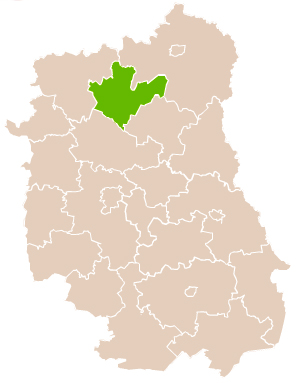
- Location within the voivodeship
- Coordinates (Radzyń): 51°46′58″N 22°37′27″E
- Country: Poland
- Voivodeship: Lublin
- Seat: Radzyń Podlaski
- Gminas: Total 8 (incl. 1 urban): Radzyń Podlaski; Gmina Borki; Gmina Czemierniki; Gmina Kąkolewnica; Gmina Komarówka Podlaska; Gmina Radzyń Podlaski; Gmina Ulan-Majorat; Gmina Wohyń

Area
  - Total: 965.21 km^{2} (372.67 sq mi)

Population (2019)
  - Total: 59,057
  - Density: 61.186/km^{2} (158.47/sq mi)
  - Urban: 15,709
  - Rural: 43,348
- Car plates: LRA
- Website: www.powiatradzynski.pl

Radzyń County (Polish: powiat radzyński) is a unit of territorial administration and local government (powiat) in Lublin Voivodeship, eastern Poland. It was established on January 1, 1999, as a result of the Polish local government reforms passed in 1998. Its administrative seat and only town is Radzyń Podlaski, which lies 60 kilometres (37 mi) north of the regional capital Lublin.

The county covers an area of 965.21 square kilometres (372.7 sq mi). As of 2019, its total population is 59,057, including a population of 15,709 in Radzyń Podlaski and a rural population of 43,348.

== Neighbouring counties ==
Radzyń County is bordered by Biała County to the north-east, Parczew County to the south-east, Lubartów County to the south and Łuków County to the north-west.

== Administrative divisions ==
The county is subdivided into eight gminas (one urban and seven rural). These are listed in the following table, in descending order of population.

Gmina	Type	Area (km^{2})	Population (2019)	Seat
Radzyń Podlaski	urban	19.3	15,709	
Gmina Radzyń Podlaski	rural	155.2	8,079	Radzyń Podlaski (Note: seat not part of the gmina)
Gmina Kąkolewnica	rural	147.7	8,073	Kąkolewnica
Gmina Wohyń	rural	178.2	6,649	Wohyń
Gmina Ulan-Majorat	rural	107.8	6,006	Ulan-Majorat
Gmina Borki	rural	111.8	6,003	Borki
Gmina Czemierniki	rural	107.7	4,319	Czemierniki
Gmina Komarówka Podlaska	rural	137.6	4,219	Komarówka Podlaska
