= Warsaw–Katowice railway =

Railway line in Poland

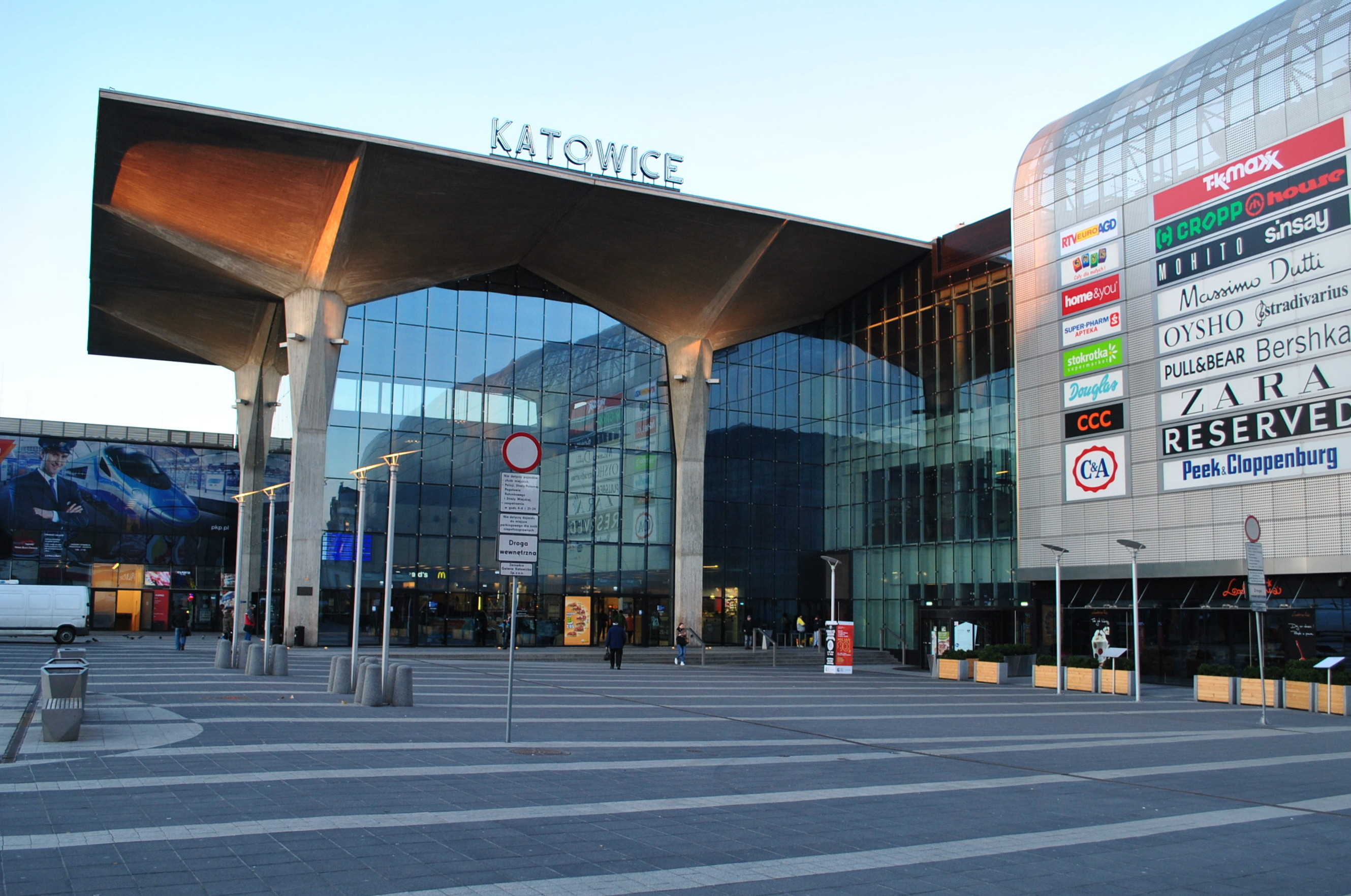
- PKP Katowice railway station

Overview
- Owner: PKP
- Locale: Masovian Voivodeship; Łódź Voivodeship; Silesian Voivodeship
- Termini: Warszawa Zachodnia railway station; Katowice railway station

History
- Opened: 1844–1848

Technical
- Track length: 318,686 km
- Track gauge: 1,435 mm (4 ft 8 1/2 in)
- Operating speed: 160 km/h

The Warszawa Zachodnia–Katowice railway, designated as Railway line 1 is a double-track, electrified railway line running across the Masovian, Łódź and Silesian Voivodeship, and as such serving as the main railway artery between Warsaw and Katowice.

The line initially opened as part of the Warsaw–Vienna railway.

== Modernization ==
In June 2025, a contract was signed for the modernization of the Koluszki–Częstochowa section. The project includes track replacement on selected sections, the installation of 24 new turnouts at major stations, track geometry improvements, and the renovation of four bridges and a viaduct in Częstochowa. Train speeds on the upgraded sections are planned to increase from 120 km/h to 160 km/h, improving both efficiency and safety. Station platforms will also be rebuilt to meet technical standards for higher speeds.

Modern signalling systems will be installed on the Koluszki–Piotrków Trybunalski and Rudniki sections, including automatic block signalling, which will increase line capacity and enable more frequent services. Safety at crossings will be improved through upgrades at 37 level crossings and two pedestrian crossings, equipped with new warning lights and barriers.

== Route plan ==
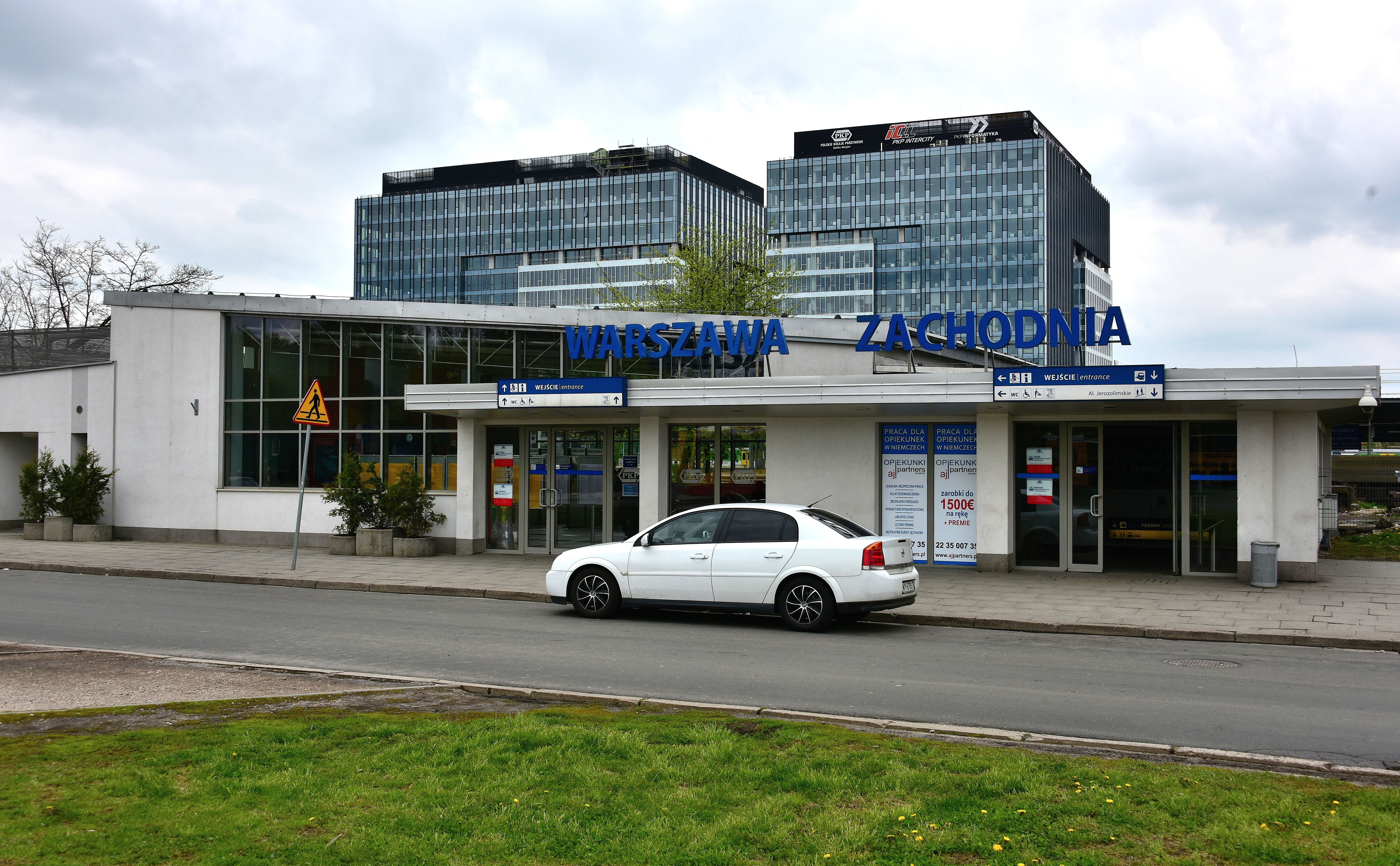
Warszawa Zachodnia railway station

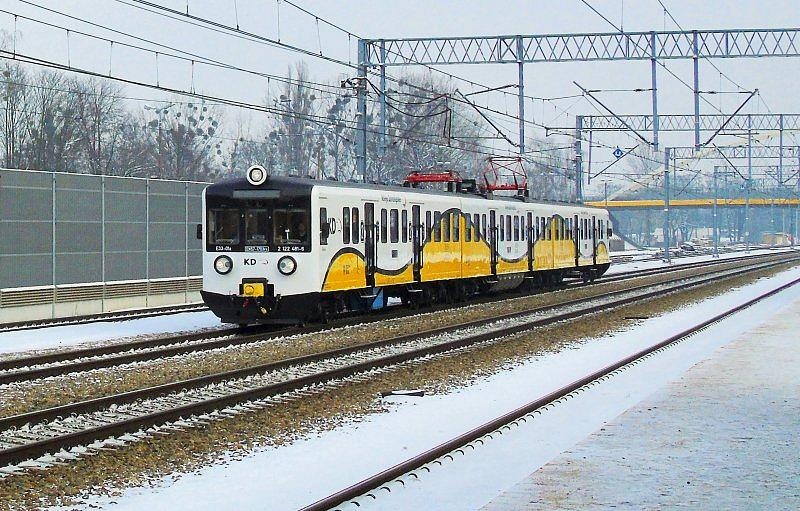
EN57-1703 electric unit at Grodzisk Mazowiecki railway station.

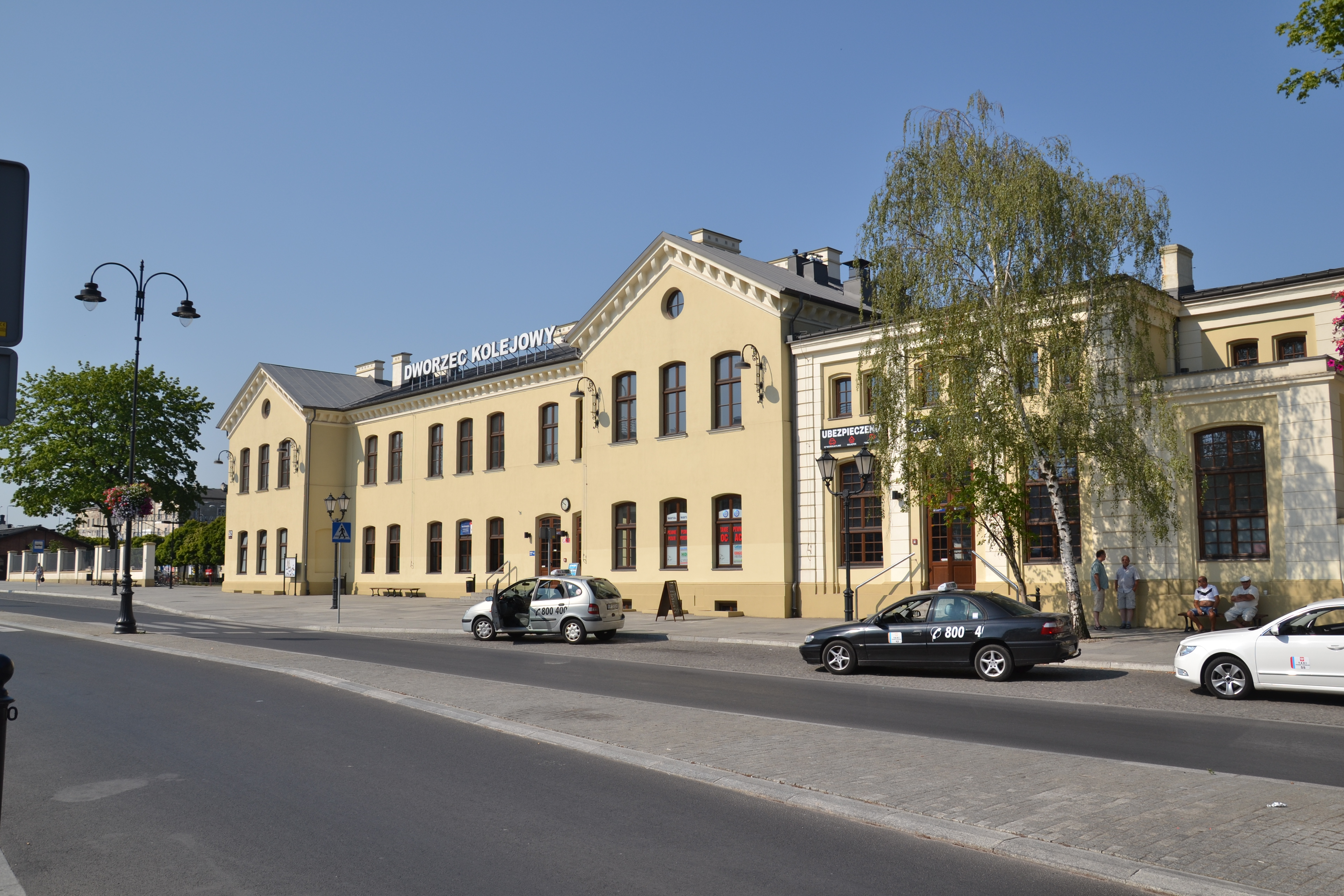
Piotrków Trybunalski railway station

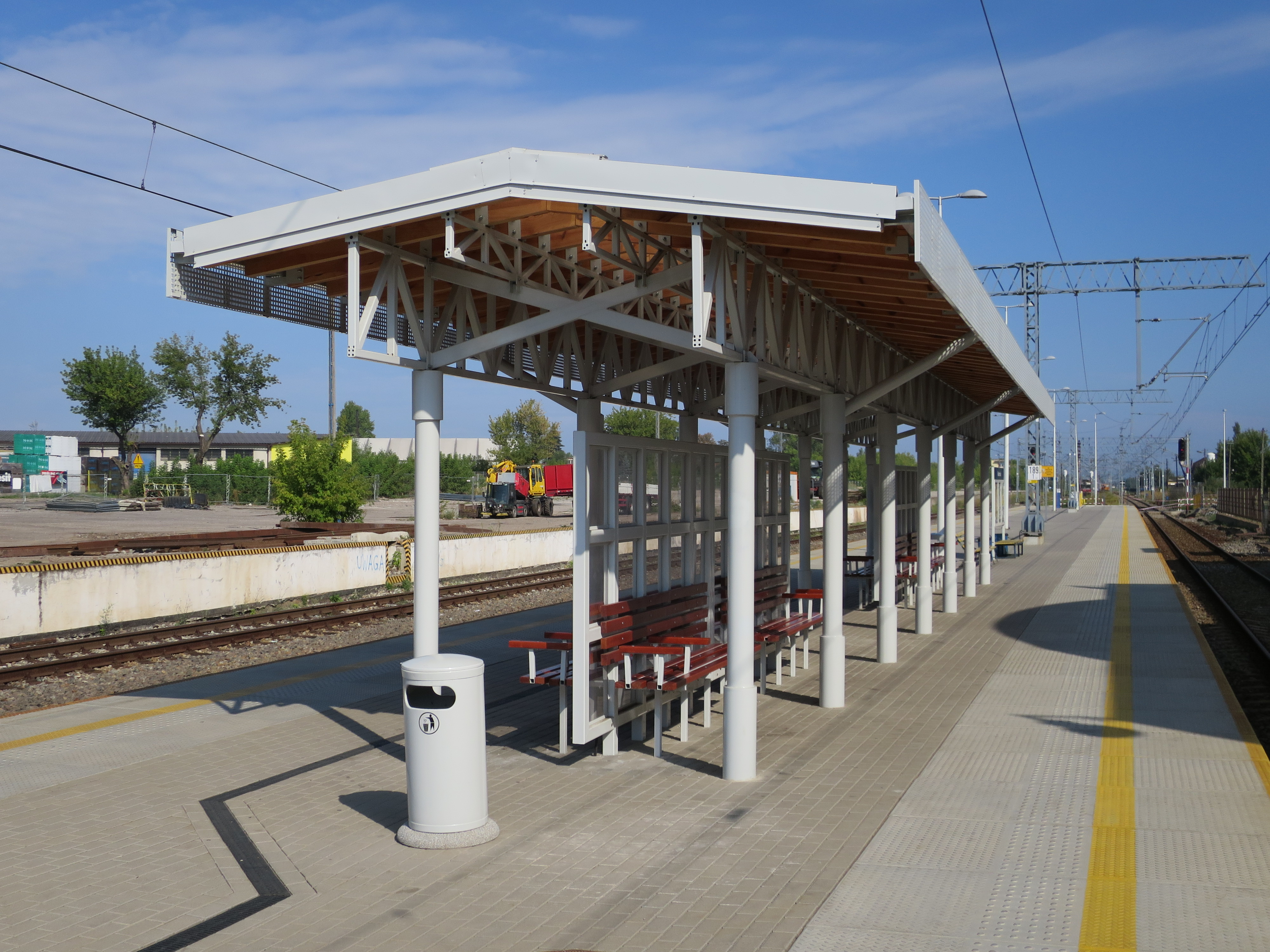
Radomsko railway station platform with a shelter

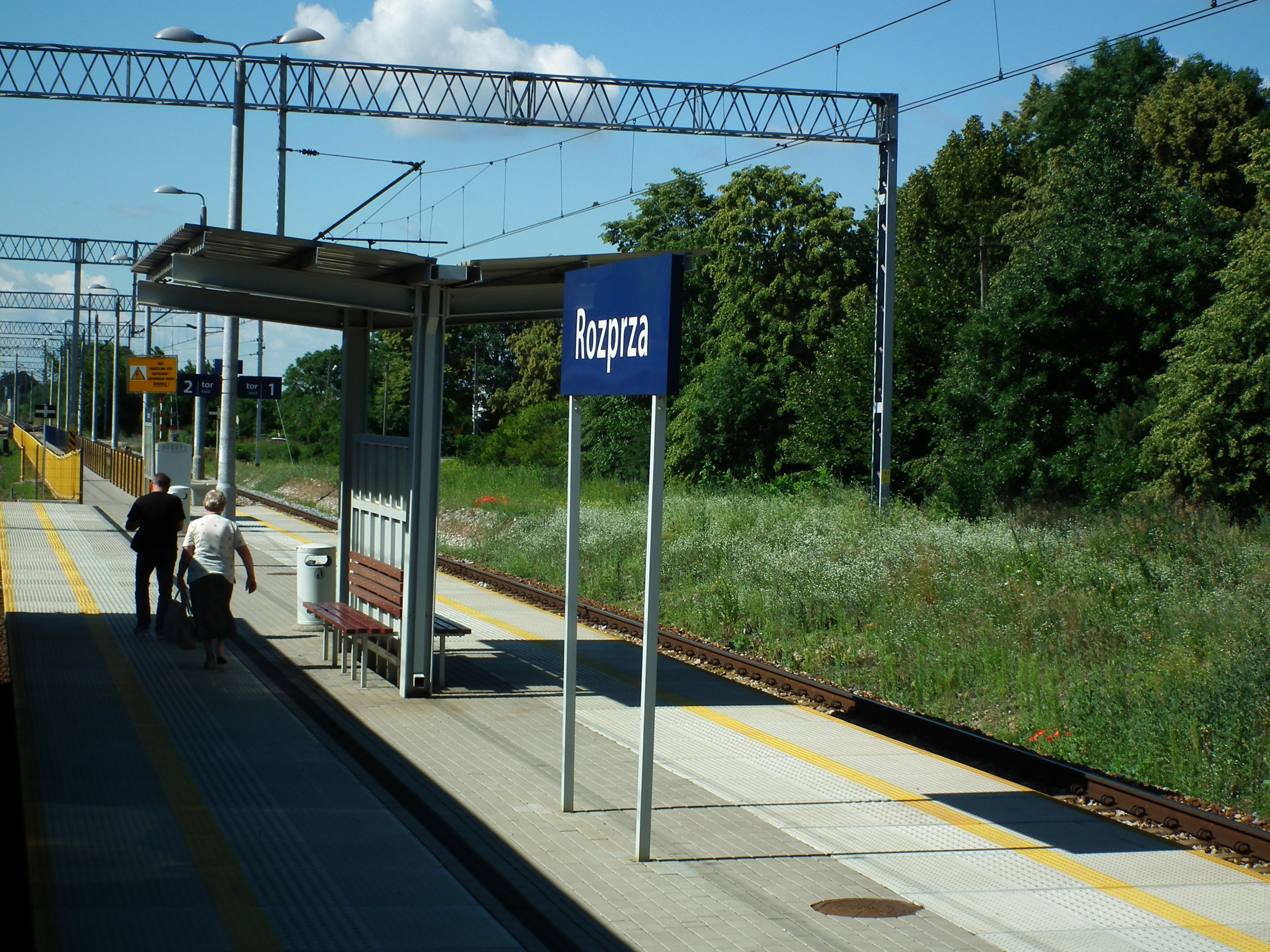
Rozprza railway station

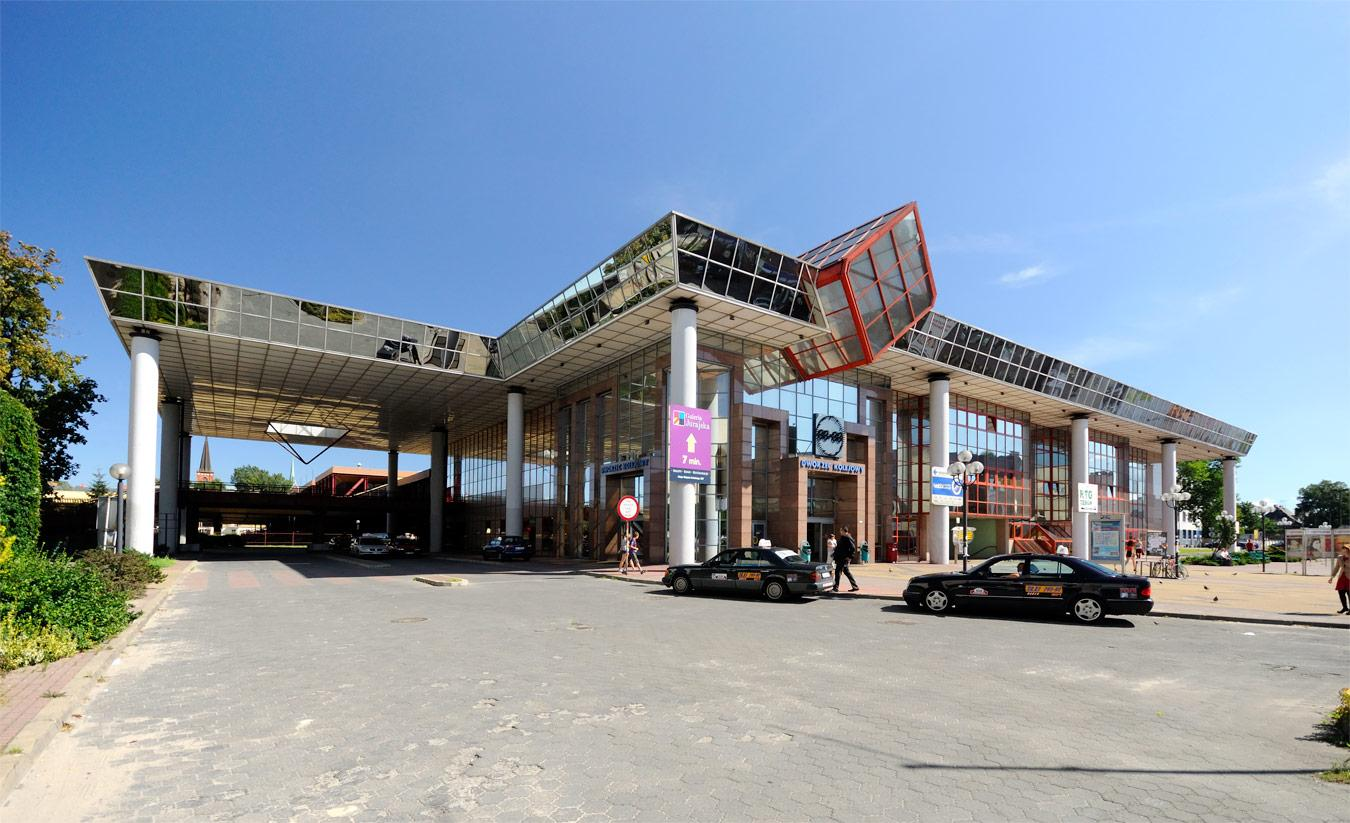
Częstochowa railway station

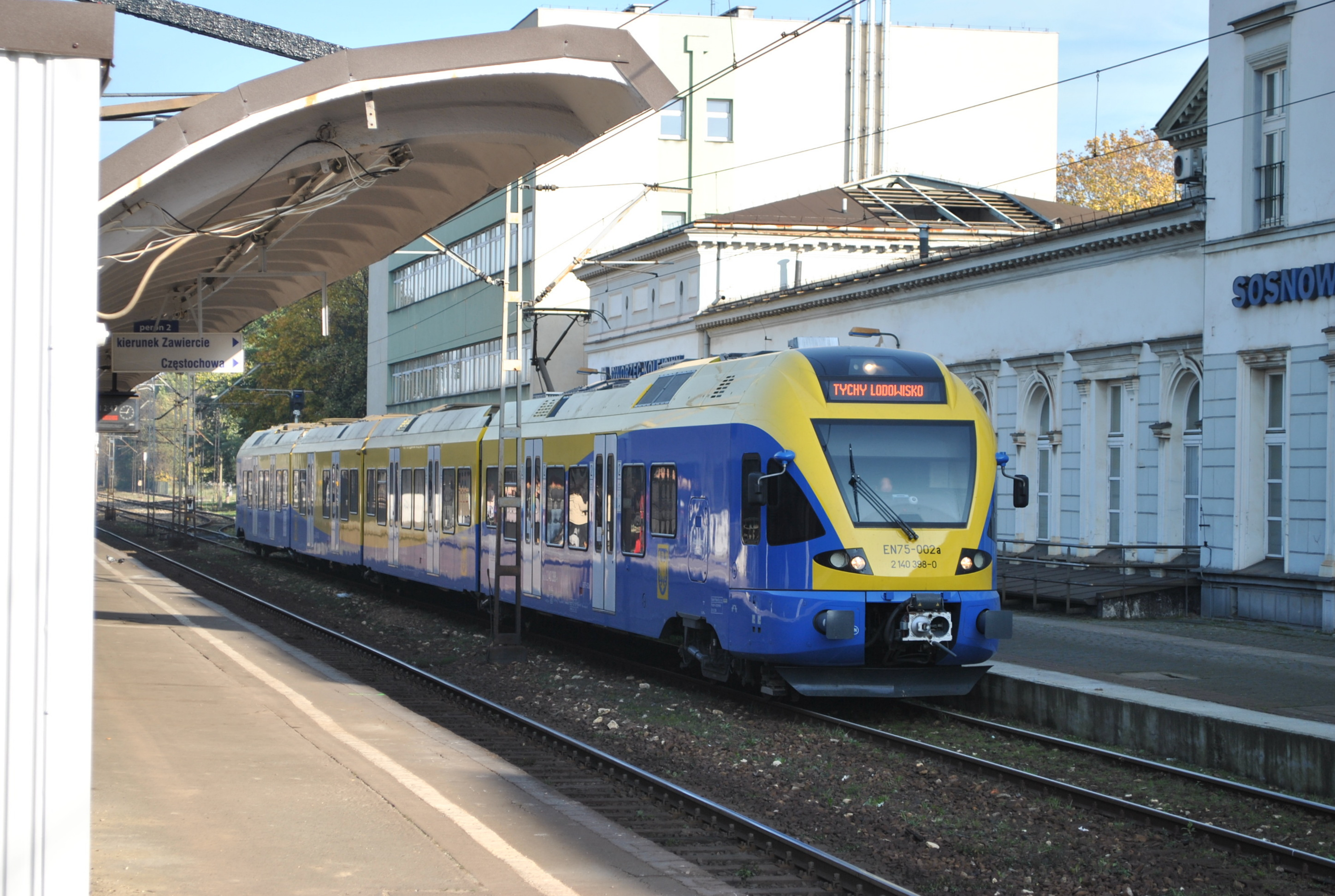
EN75 electric unit at Sosnowiec Główny railway station heading to Tychy Lodowisko railway station.

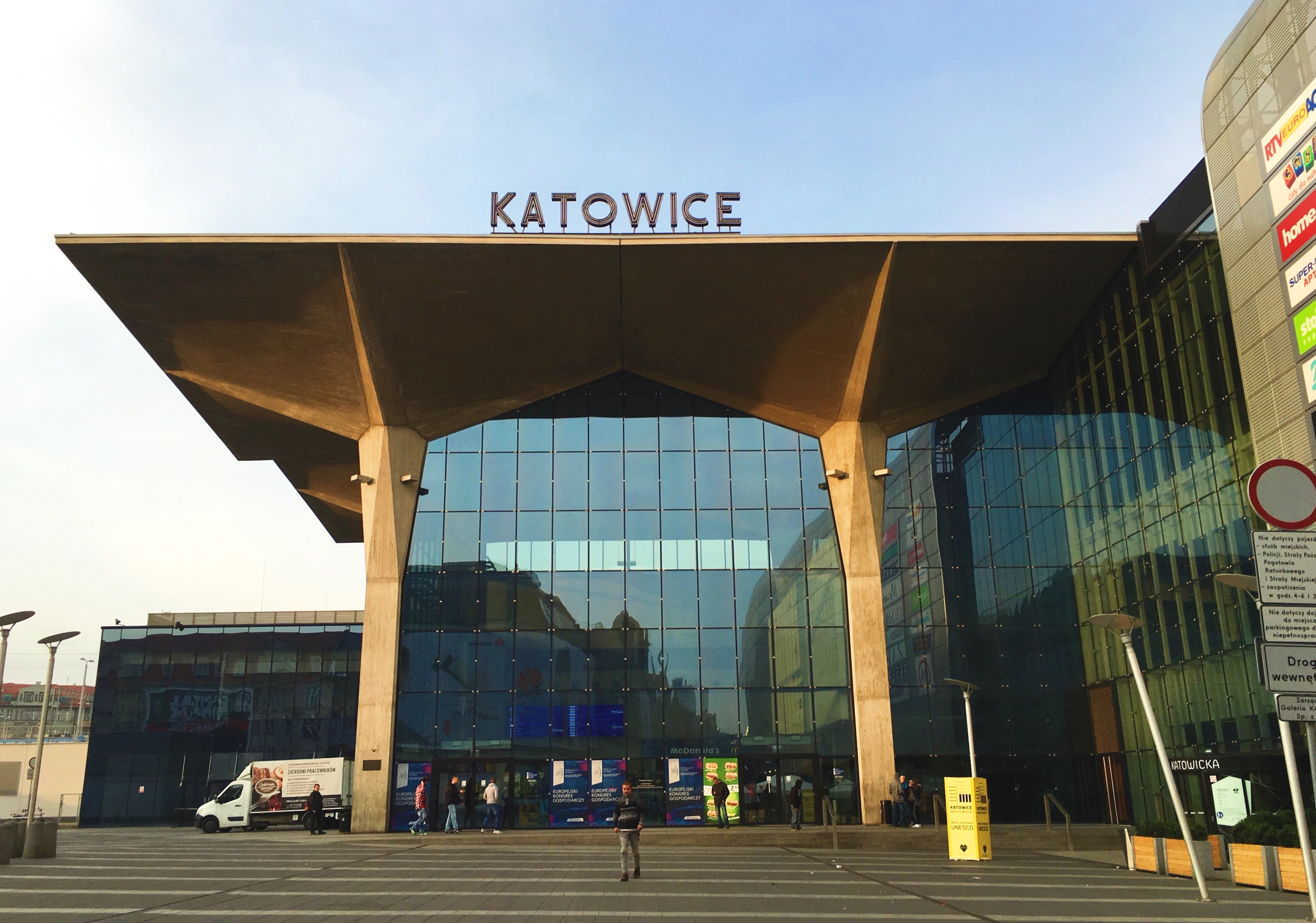
Katowice railway station

Distance (km)	Railway station	Note
3.082	Warszawa Zachodnia	
6.804	Warszawa Włochy	
9.217	Warszawa Ursus	
10.345	Warszawa Ursus Niedźwiadek	
12.444	Piastów	
15.819	Pruszków	
22.117	Brwinów	
25.993	Milanówek	
29.548	Grodzisk Mazowiecki	
35.034	Jaktorów	
40.437	Międzyborów	
43.141	Żyrardów	
50.033	Sucha Żyrardowska	
51.982	Jesionka	
55.246	Radziwiłłów Mazowiecki	
60.644	Skierniewice Rawka	
65.292	Skierniewice	
71.254	Dąbrowice Skierniewickie	
75.349	Maków	
80.131	Płyćwia	
84.813	Lipce Reymontowskie	
89.681	Krosnowa	
92.345	Przyłęk Duży	
95.723	Rogów	
99.572	Wągry	
105.194	Koluszki	
111.011	Chrusty Nowe	
114.176	Rokiciny	
118.661	Łaznów	
123.535	Wolbórka	
129.944	Baby	
133.935	Moszczenica	
138.561	Jarosty	
144.242	Piotrków Trybunalski	
145.342	Piotrków Trybunalski Towarowy	Freight station
150.364	Milejów	
156.544	Rozprza	
159.328	Luciążanka	
162.525	Wilkoszewice	
166.718	Gorzkowice'	
171.580	Gorzędów	
174.975	Kamieńsk	
177.694	Gomunice	
183.436	Dobryszyce koło Radomska	
189.133	Radomsko	
194.705	Bobry	
200.525	Widzów Teklinów	
202.736	Jacków	
208.201	Kłomnice	
210.606	Rzerzęczyce	
217.700	Rudniki koło Częstochowy	
225.815	Częstochowa Aniołów	
229.745	Częstochowa	
232.020	Częstochowa Towarowa	Freight station
233.400	Częstochowa Raków	
239.158	Korwinów	
246.462	Poraj	
250.787	Masłońskie Natalin	
254.088	Żarki Letnisko	
257.525	Myszków Nowa Wieś	
261.016	Myszków	
263.442	Myszków Światowit	
266.370	Myszków Mrzygłód	
270.300	Zawiercie Borowe Pole	
274.227	Zawiercie	
280.654	Łazy	
284.340	Wiesiółka	
286.557	Chruszczobród	
289.202	Dąbrowa Górnicza Sikorka	
292.896	Dąbrowa Górnicza Ząbkowice	
295.398	Dąbrowa Górnicza Pogoria	
296.726	Dąbrowa Górnicza Gołonóg	
300,125	Dąbrowa Górnicza	
302.077	Będzin Ksawera	
304.385	Będzin Miasto	
305.524	Będzin	
309.544	Sosnowiec Główny	
312.910	Katowice Szopienice Południowe	
315.653	Katowice Zawodzie	
318.378	Katowice	
