= Cyganka =

Cyganka may refer to:

== Places ==
- Cyganka, Lublin Voivodeship (east Poland)
- Cyganka, Masovian Voivodeship (east-central Poland)
- Cyganka, Żyrardów County in Masovian Voivodeship (east-central Poland)
- Cyganka, Silesian Voivodeship (south Poland)
- Cyganka, Pomeranian Voivodeship (north Poland)

== Entertainment ==
- The Gypsy Girl, a 1953 Yugoslav film
