= Jesionka railway station =

Railway station in Żyrardów County, Poland

Jesionka

General information
- Location: Jesionka, Wiskitki, Żyrardów, Masovian; Poland
- Coordinates: 52.8480795°N 19.6532546°E
- System: Rail Station
- Owner: Polskie Koleje Państwowe S.A.

Services
Preceding station	Masovian Railways	Following station
Radziwiłłów Mazowiecki towards Skierniewice	R1	Sucha Żyrardowska towards Warszawa Wschodnia or Warszawa Główna
Radziwiłłów Mazowiecki towards Skierniewice	RE1	Sucha Żyrardowska towards Warszawa Wschodnia or Warszawa Główna
Location

Jesionka railway station is a railway station in Jesionka, Żyrardów, Masovian, Poland. It is served by Masovian Railways.
