= Kamionka Mała =

Kamionka Mała may refer to the following places:

- Kamionka Mała, Limanowa County in Lesser Poland Voivodeship (south Poland)
- Kamionka Mała, Nowy Sącz County in Lesser Poland Voivodeship (south Poland)
- Kamionka Mała, Masovian Voivodeship (east-central Poland)
