= Sucha Żyrardowska railway station =

Railway station in Żyrardów County, Poland

Sucha Żyrardowska
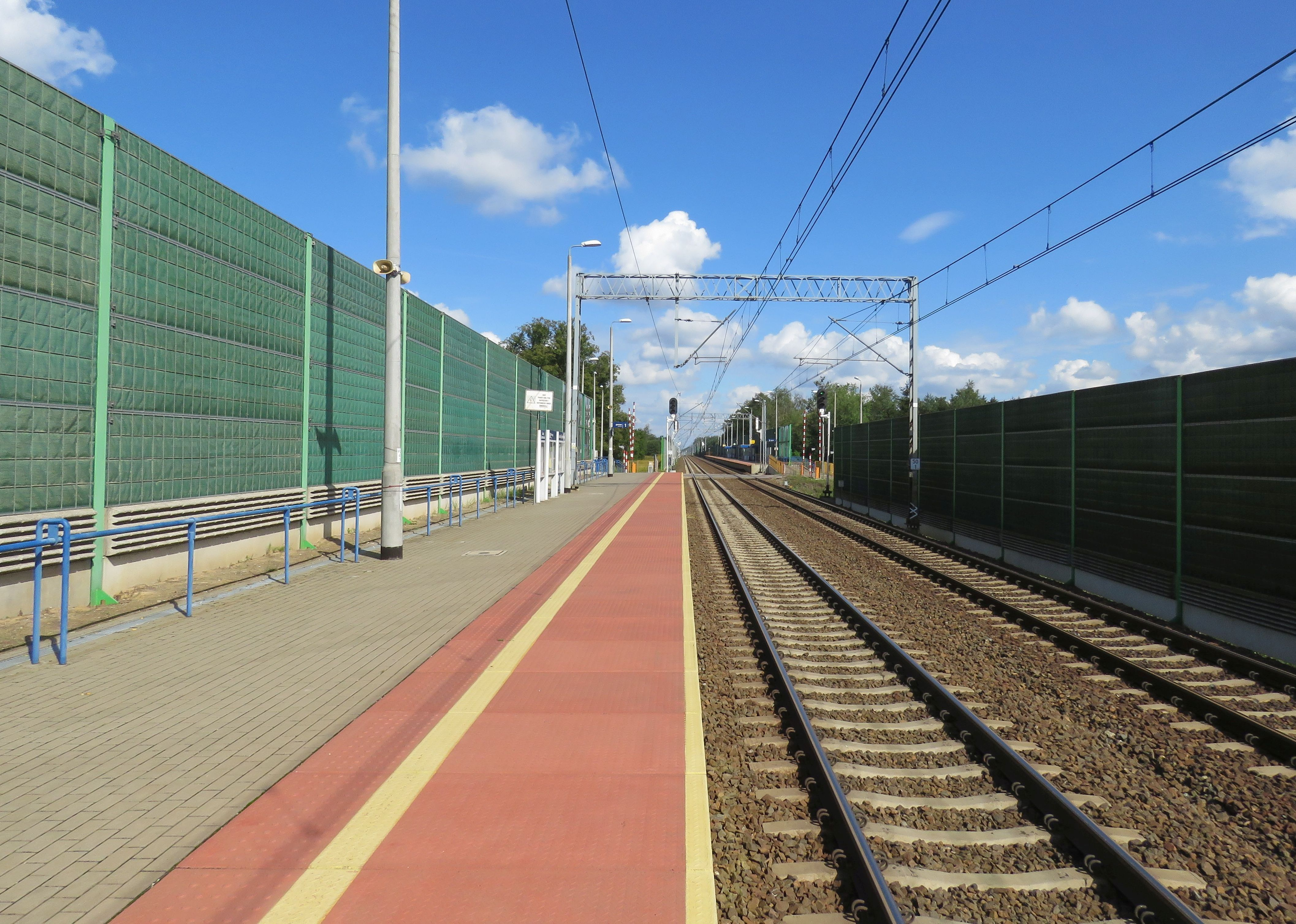

General information
- Location: Józefów, Wiskitki, Żyrardów, Masovian; Poland
- Coordinates: 52.8480795°N 19.6532546°E
- System: Rail Station
- Owner: Polskie Koleje Państwowe S.A.

Services
Preceding station	Masovian Railways	Following station
Jesionka towards Skierniewice	R1	Żyrardów towards Warszawa Wschodnia or Warszawa Główna
Jesionka towards Skierniewice	RE1	Żyrardów towards Warszawa Wschodnia or Warszawa Główna
Location

Sucha Żyrardowska railway station is a railway station in Józefów, Żyrardów, Masovian, Poland. It is served by Masovian Railways.
