= Duninopol =

- Village
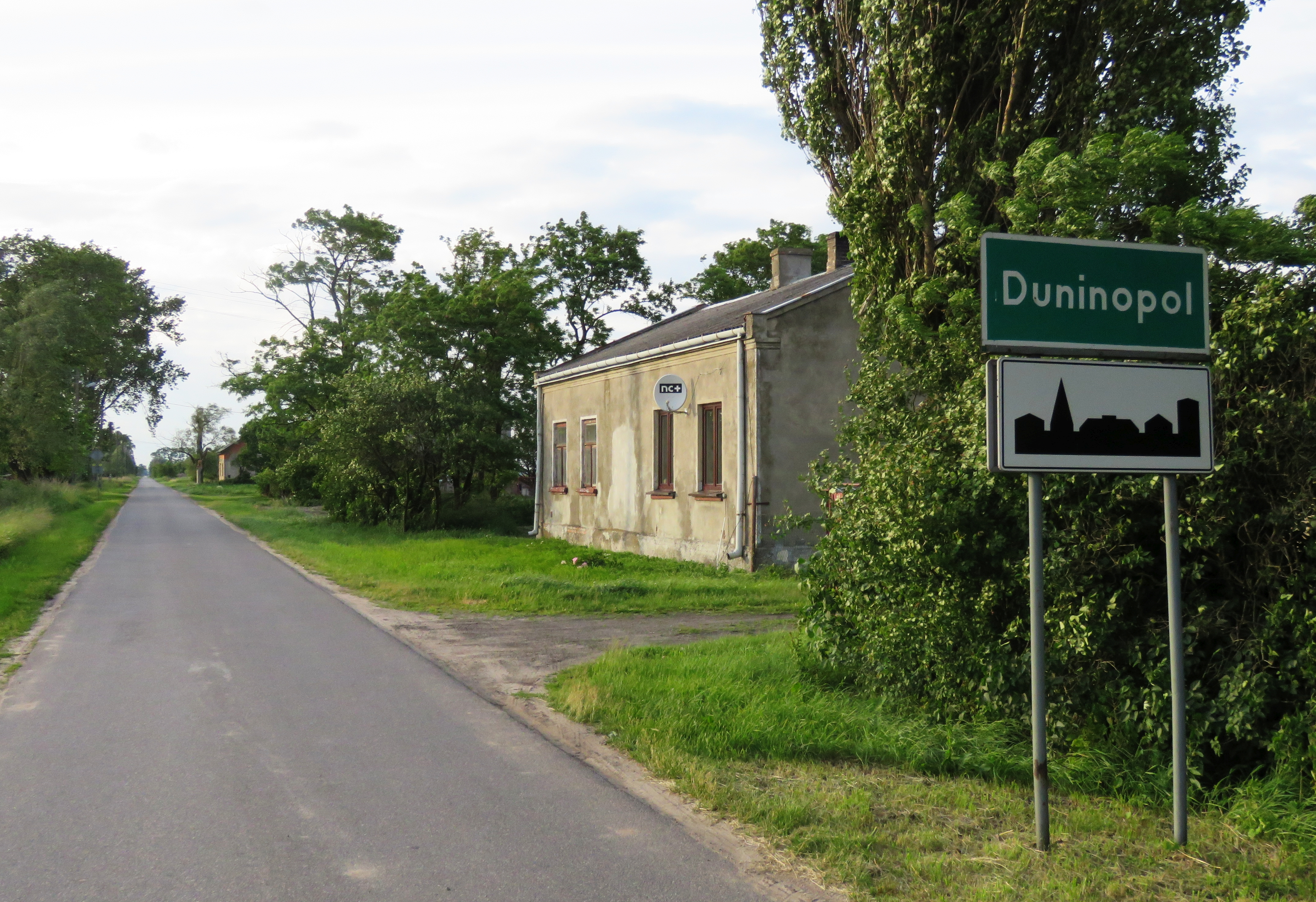
- Duninopol

- Location within Poland
- Coordinates: 52°07′40″N 20°24′02″E
- Country: Poland
- Voivodeship: Masovian
- County: Żyrardów
- Gmina: Wiskitki

Duninopol [duniˈnɔpɔl] is a village in the administrative district of Gmina Wiskitki, within Żyrardów County, Masovian Voivodeship, in east-central Poland.
