= Stara Wieś, Żyrardów County =

Stara Wieś
- Village
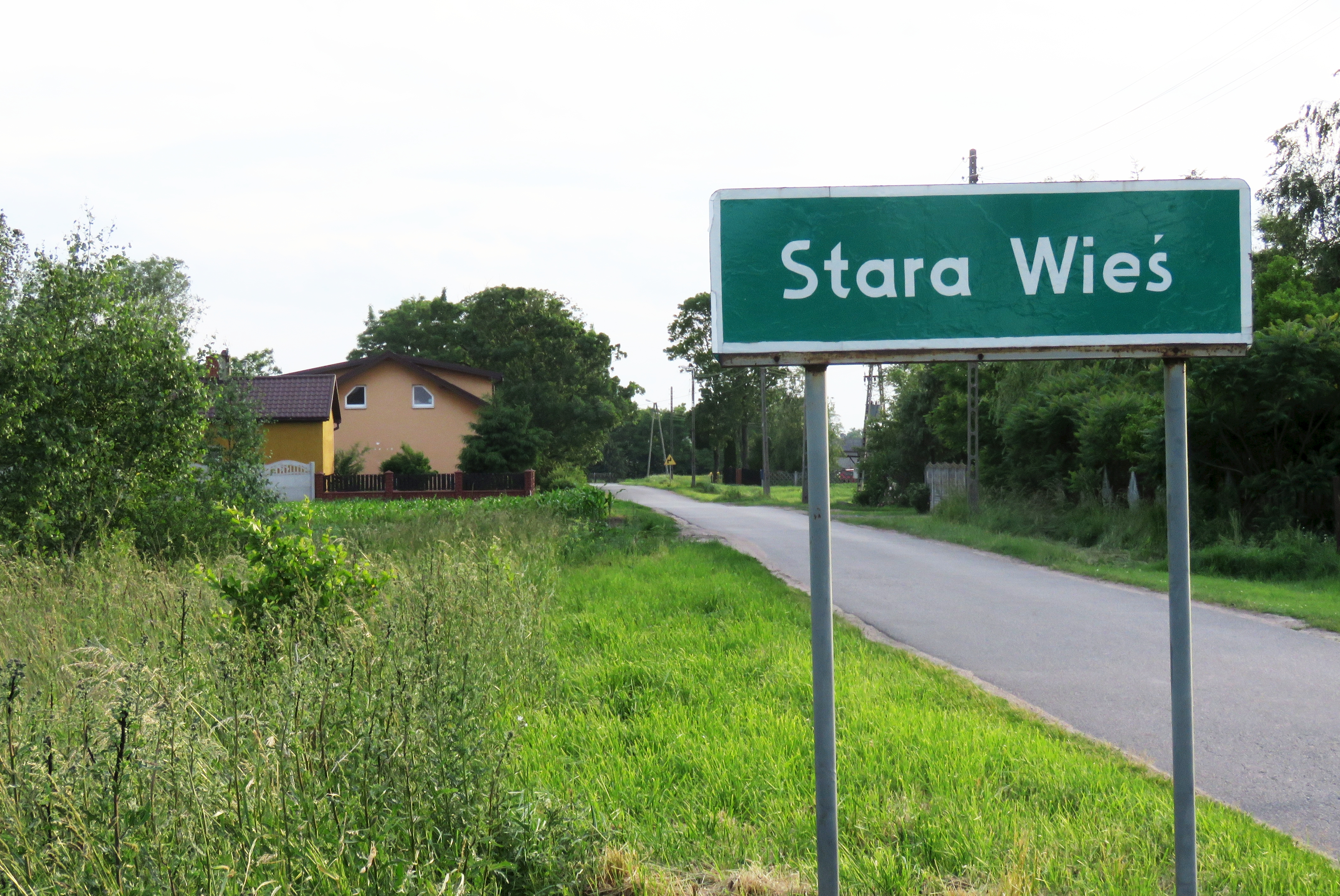

- Location within Poland
- Coordinates: 52°06′38″N 20°22′57″E
- Country: Poland
- Voivodeship: Masovian
- County: Żyrardów
- Gmina: Wiskitki

Stara Wieś [ˈstara ˈvjɛɕ] is a village in the administrative district of Gmina Wiskitki, within Żyrardów County, Masovian Voivodeship, in east-central Poland.
