= Guzów-Osada =

Village in Gmina Wiskitki, Poland

- Village
- Location within Poland
- Coordinates: 52°06′35″N 20°18′04″E
- Country: Poland
- Voivodeship: Masovian
- County: Żyrardów
- Gmina: Wiskitki

Guzów-Osada [ˈɡuzuf ɔˈsada] is a village in the administrative district of Gmina Wiskitki, within Żyrardów County, Masovian Voivodeship, in east-central Poland.
