= Różanów =

Village in Gmina Wiskitki, Poland

- Village
- Location within Poland
- Coordinates: 52°07′07″N 20°15′31″E
- Country: Poland
- Voivodeship: Masovian
- County: Żyrardów
- Gmina: Wiskitki
- Population: 160

Różanów [ruˈʐanuf] is a village in the administrative district of Gmina Wiskitki, within Żyrardów County, Masovian Voivodeship, in east-central Poland.
