= Feliksów, Żyrardów County =

Feliksów
- Village
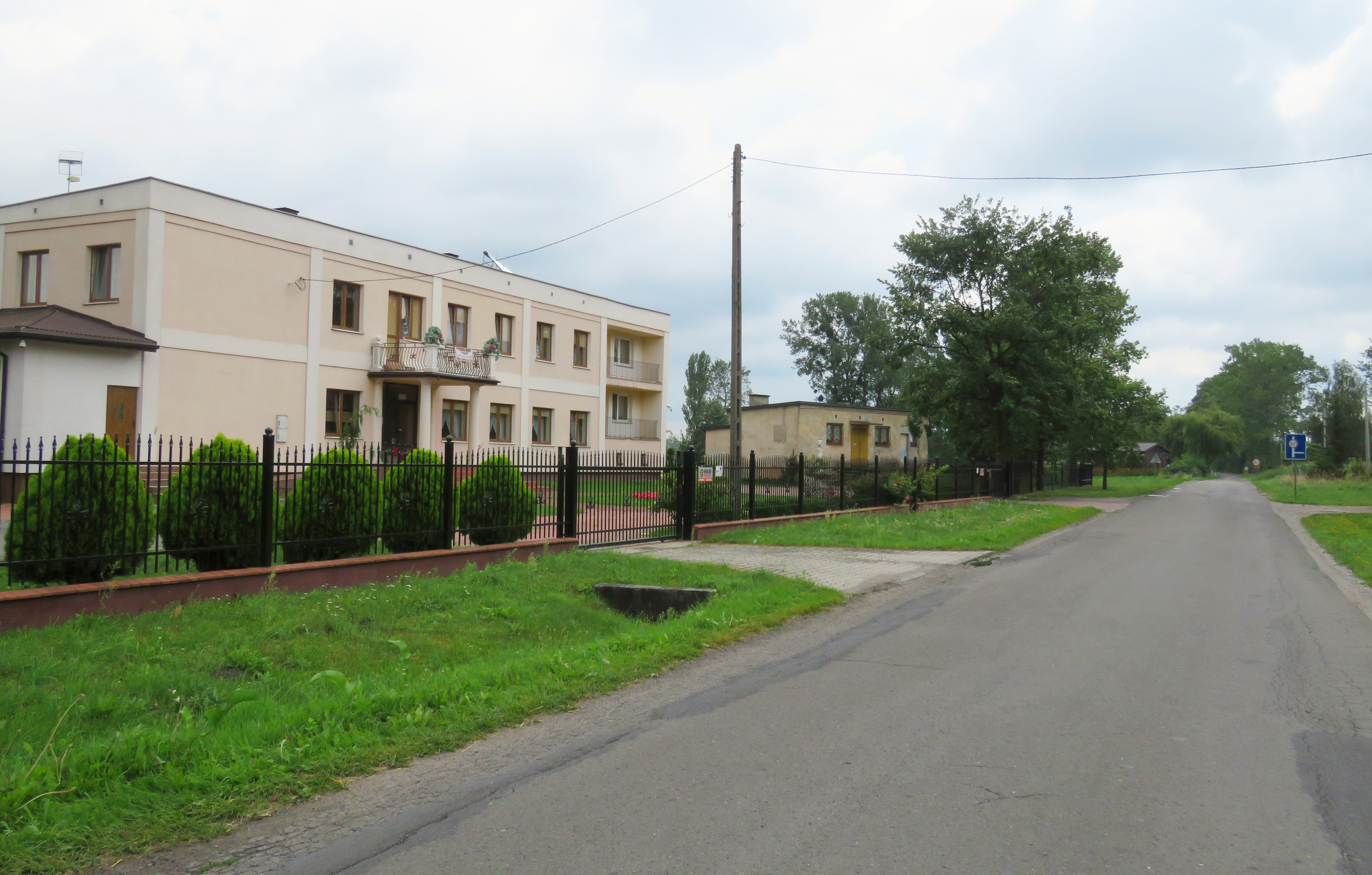

- Location within Poland
- Coordinates: 52°6′N 20°26′E
- Country: Poland
- Voivodeship: Masovian
- County: Żyrardów
- Gmina: Wiskitki

Feliksów (Polish pronunciation: [fɛˈliksuf]) is a village in the administrative district of Gmina Wiskitki, which is located within Żyrardów County of Masovian Voivodeship in east-central Poland.
