= Miedniewice-Parcela =

- Village
- Location within Poland
- Coordinates: 52°04′48″N 20°19′31″E
- Country: Poland
- Voivodeship: Masovian
- County: Żyrardów
- Gmina: Wiskitki

Miedniewice-Parcela [mjɛdɲɛˈvit͡sɛ parˈt͡sɛla] is a village in the administrative district of Gmina Wiskitki, within Żyrardów County, Masovian Voivodeship, in east-central Poland.
