= Radziwiłłów Mazowiecki railway station =

Railway station in Masovian Voivodeship, Poland

Radziwiłłów Mazowiecki
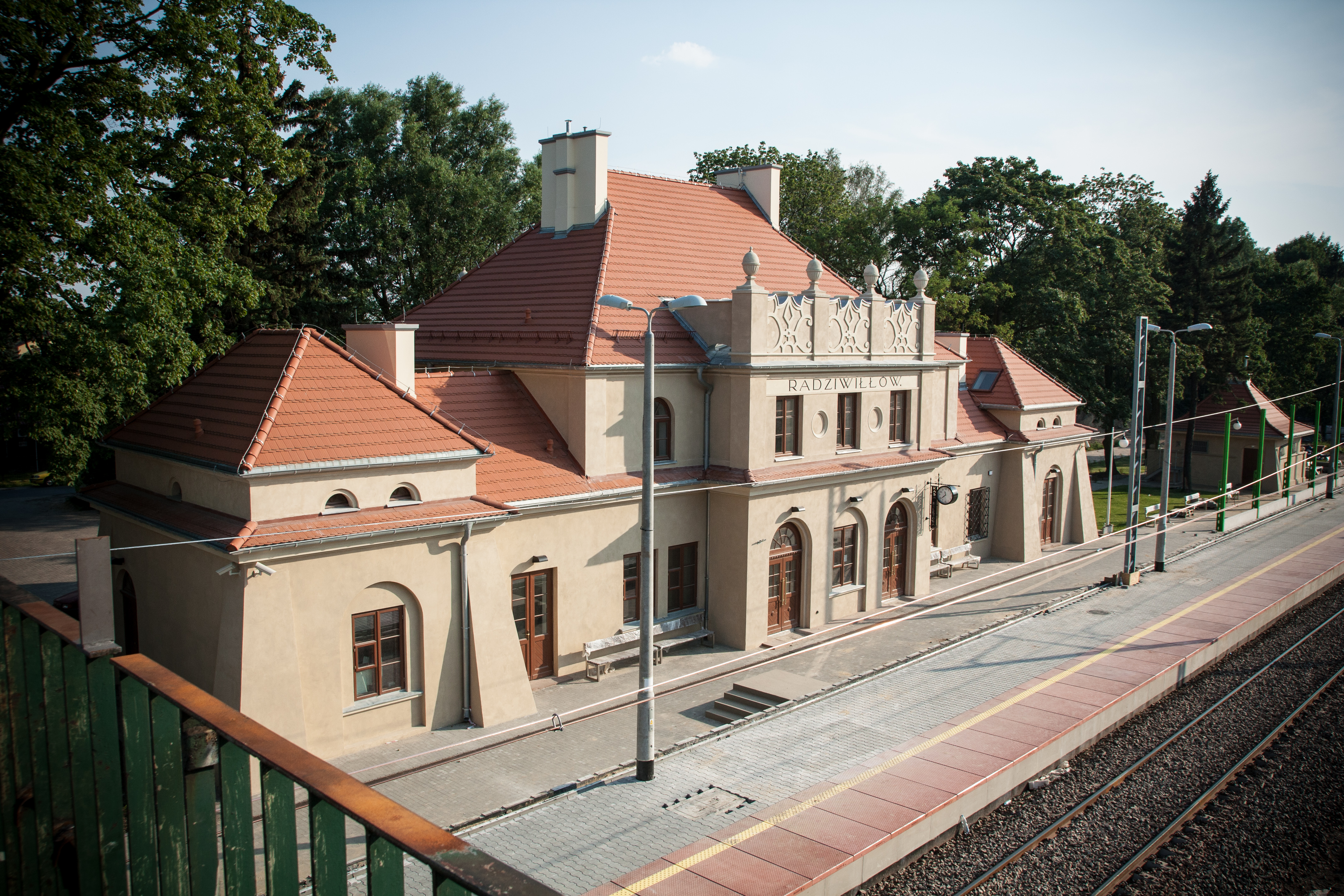

General information
- Location: Radziwiłłów, Puszcza Mariańska, Żyrardów, Masovian; Poland
- Coordinates: 52.00033°N 20.29048°E
- System: Rail Station
- Owner: Polskie Koleje Państwowe S.A.

Services
Preceding station	Masovian Railways	Following station
Skierniewice Rawka towards Skierniewice	R1	Jesionka towards Warszawa Wschodnia or Warszawa Główna
Skierniewice Rawka towards Skierniewice	RE1	Jesionka towards Warszawa Wschodnia or Warszawa Główna
Location

Radziwiłłów Mazowiecki railway station is a railway station in Jesionka, Żyrardów, Masovian, Poland. It is served by Masovian Railways.
