= Babskie Budy =

- Village
- Location within Poland
- Coordinates: 52°6′N 20°16′E
- Country: Poland
- Voivodeship: Masovian
- County: Żyrardów
- Gmina: Wiskitki

Babskie Budy [ˈbapskʲɛ ˈbudɨ] is a village in the administrative district of Gmina Wiskitki, within Żyrardów County, Masovian Voivodeship, in east-central Poland.
