= Aleksandrów, Żyrardów County =

Aleksandrów
- Village
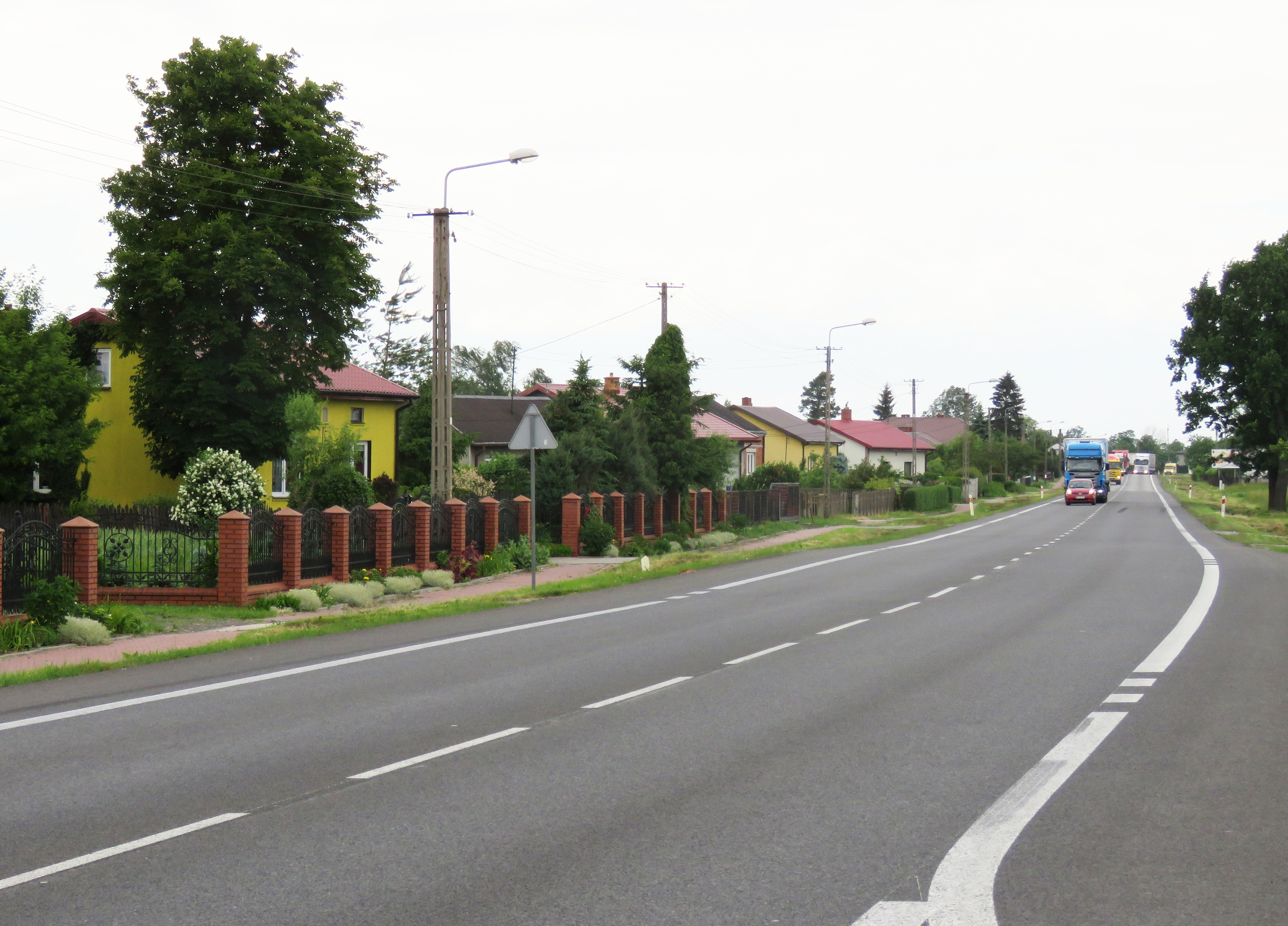

- Location within Poland
- Coordinates: 52°08′08″N 20°19′27″E
- Country: Poland
- Voivodeship: Masovian
- County: Żyrardów
- Gmina: Wiskitki

Aleksandrów [alɛkˈsandruf] is a village in the administrative district of Gmina Wiskitki, within Żyrardów County, Masovian Voivodeship, in east-central Poland.
