= Nowa Wieś, Żyrardów County =

Nowa Wieś
- Village
- Location within Poland
- Coordinates: 52°4′15″N 20°15′3″E
- Country: Poland
- Voivodeship: Masovian
- County: Żyrardów
- Gmina: Wiskitki
- Population: 200

Nowa Wieś [ˈnɔva ˈvjɛɕ] is a village in the administrative district of Gmina Wiskitki, within Żyrardów County, Masovian Voivodeship, in east-central Poland.
