= Nowe Kozłowice =

- Village
- Location within Poland
- Coordinates: 52°5′N 20°26′E
- Country: Poland
- Voivodeship: Masovian
- County: Żyrardów
- Gmina: Wiskitki

Nowe Kozłowice [ˈnɔvɛ kɔzwɔˈvit͡sɛ] is a village in the administrative district of Gmina Wiskitki, within Żyrardów County, Masovian Voivodeship, in east-central Poland.
