= Janówek, Gmina Wiskitki =

Janówek
- Village
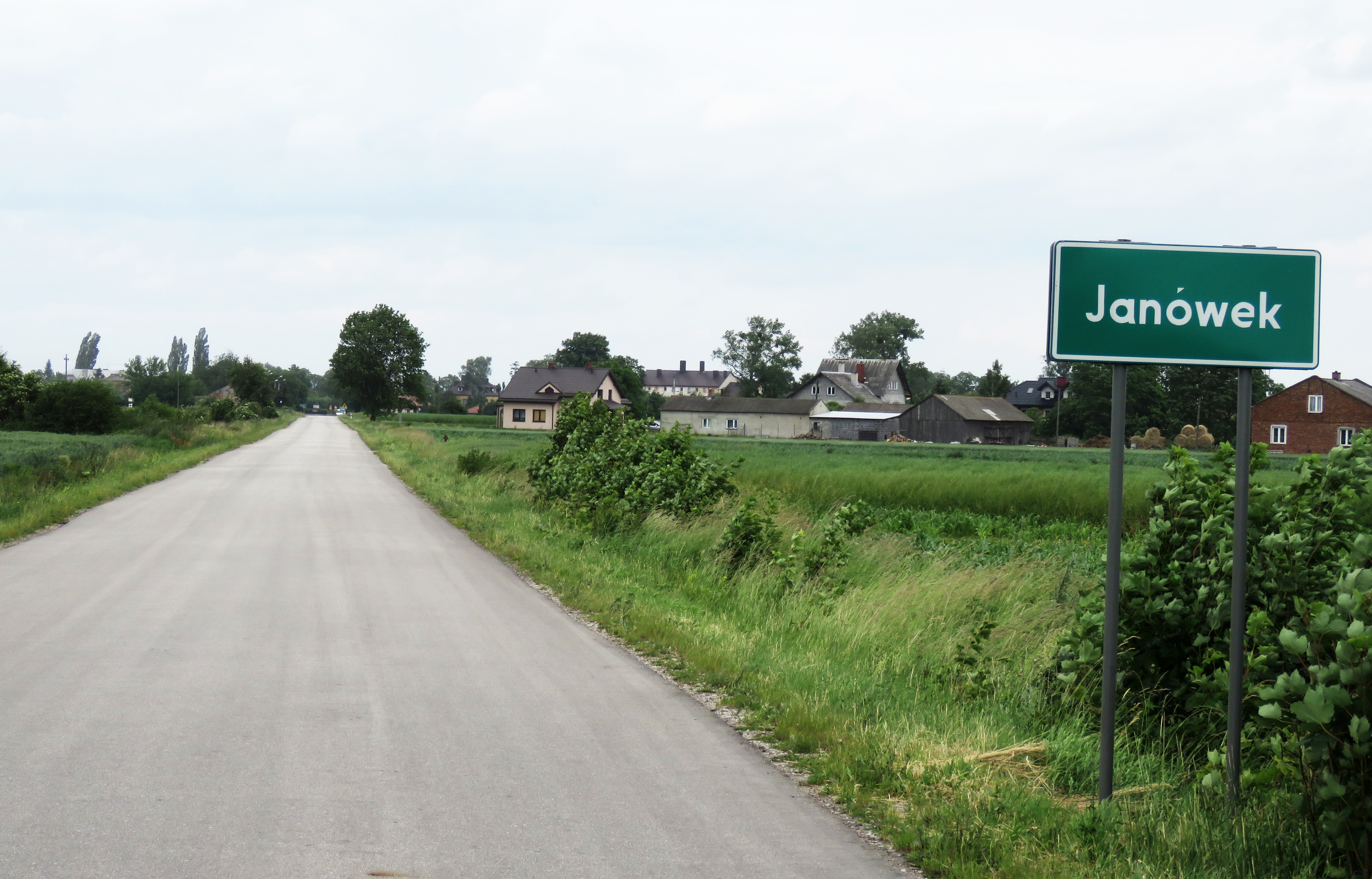
- Street and road sign of Janówek, Gmina Wiskitki

- Location within Poland
- Coordinates: 52°07′03″N 20°22′18″E
- Country: Poland
- Voivodeship: Masovian
- County: Żyrardów
- Gmina: Wiskitki

Janówek [jaˈnuvɛk] is a village in the administrative district of Gmina Wiskitki, within Żyrardów County, Masovian Voivodeship, in east-central Poland.
