= Wola Miedniewska =

- Village
- Location within Poland
- Coordinates: 52°6′N 20°18′E
- Country: Poland
- Voivodeship: Masovian
- County: Żyrardów
- Gmina: Wiskitki

Wola Miedniewska [ˈvɔla mjɛdˈɲɛfska] is a village in the administrative district of Gmina Wiskitki, within Żyrardów County, Masovian Voivodeship, in east-central Poland.
