= Hipolitów, Żyrardów County =

Hipolitów
- Village
- Location within Poland
- Coordinates: 52°5′N 20°19′E
- Country: Poland
- Voivodeship: Masovian
- County: Żyrardów
- Gmina: Wiskitki

Hipolitów [xipɔˈlituf] is a village in the administrative district of Gmina Wiskitki, within Żyrardów County, Masovian Voivodeship, in east-central Poland.
