= Oryszew-Osada =

- Village
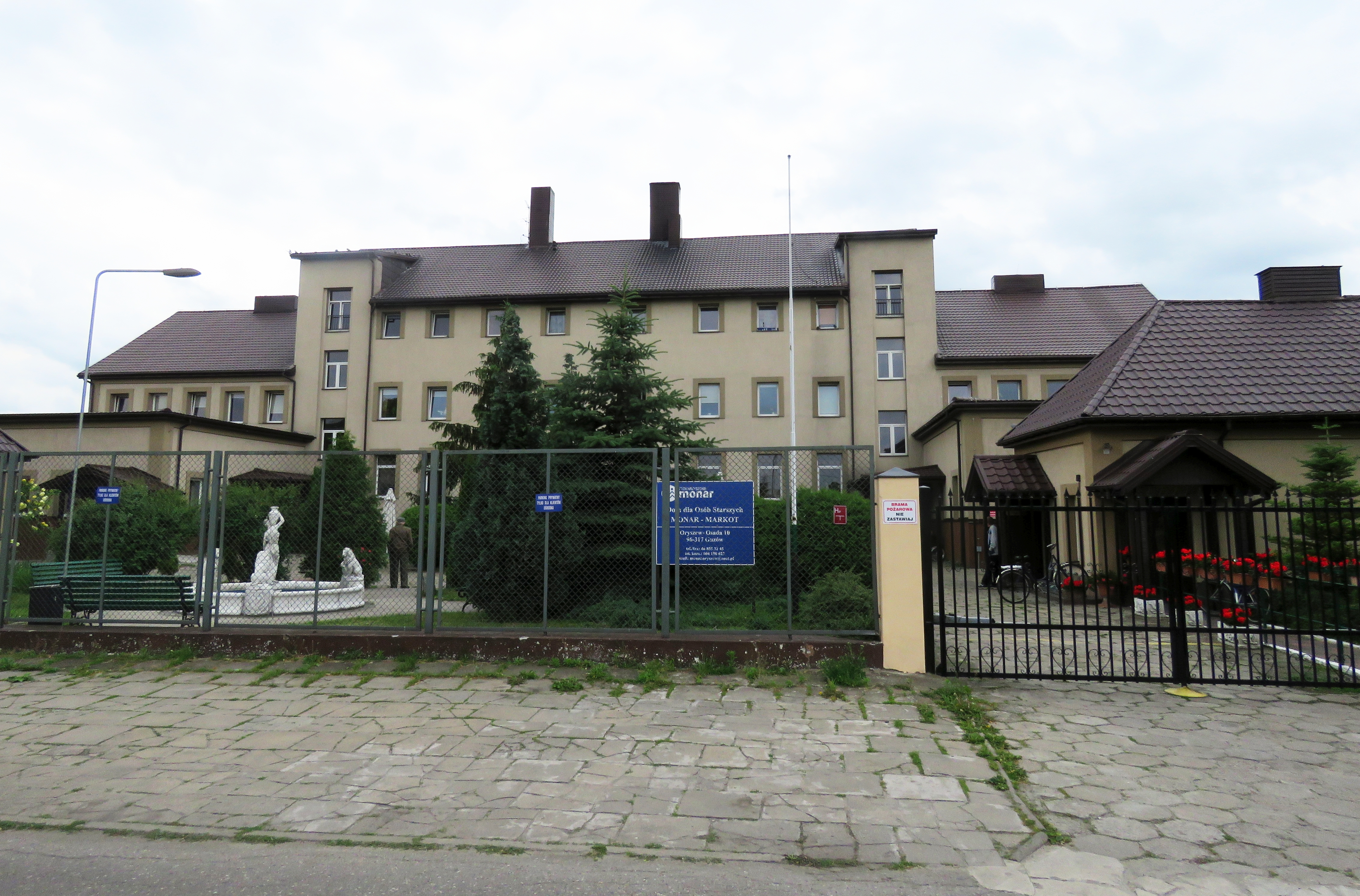

- Location within Poland
- Coordinates: 52°07′00″N 20°22′45″E
- Country: Poland
- Voivodeship: Masovian
- County: Żyrardów
- Gmina: Wiskitki

Oryszew-Osada [ɔˈrɨʂɛf ɔˈsada] is a village in the administrative district of Gmina Wiskitki, within Żyrardów County, Masovian Voivodeship, in east-central Poland.
