= Prościeniec =

- Village
- Location within Poland
- Coordinates: 52°02′13″N 20°19′05″E
- Country: Poland
- Voivodeship: Masovian
- County: Żyrardów
- Gmina: Wiskitki

Prościeniec [prɔɕˈt͡ɕɛɲɛt͡s] is a village in the administrative district of Gmina Wiskitki, within Żyrardów County, Masovian Voivodeship, in east-central Poland.
