= Kamionka, Gmina Wiskitki =

Kamionka
- Village
- Location within Poland
- Coordinates: 52°03′59″N 20°16′47″E
- Country: Poland
- Voivodeship: Masovian
- County: Żyrardów
- Gmina: Wiskitki

Kamionka [kaˈmjɔnka] is a village in the administrative district of Gmina Wiskitki, within Żyrardów County, Masovian Voivodeship, in east-central Poland.
