= Antoniew, Żyrardów County =

Antoniew
- Village
- Location within Poland
- Coordinates: 52°2′20″N 20°19′41″E
- Country: Poland
- Voivodeship: Masovian
- County: Żyrardów
- Gmina: Wiskitki

Antoniew [anˈtɔɲɛf] is a village in the administrative district of Gmina Wiskitki, within Żyrardów County, Masovian Voivodeship, in east-central Poland.
