= Czerwona Niwa-Parcel =

- Village
- Location within Poland
- Coordinates: 52°07′33″N 20°16′51″E
- Country: Poland
- Voivodeship: Masovian
- County: Żyrardów
- Gmina: Wiskitki

Czerwona Niwa-Parcel [t͡ʂɛrˈvɔna ˈniva ˈpart͡sɛl] is a village in the administrative district of Gmina Wiskitki, within Żyrardów County, Masovian Voivodeship, in east-central Poland.
