= Nowy Oryszew =

- Village
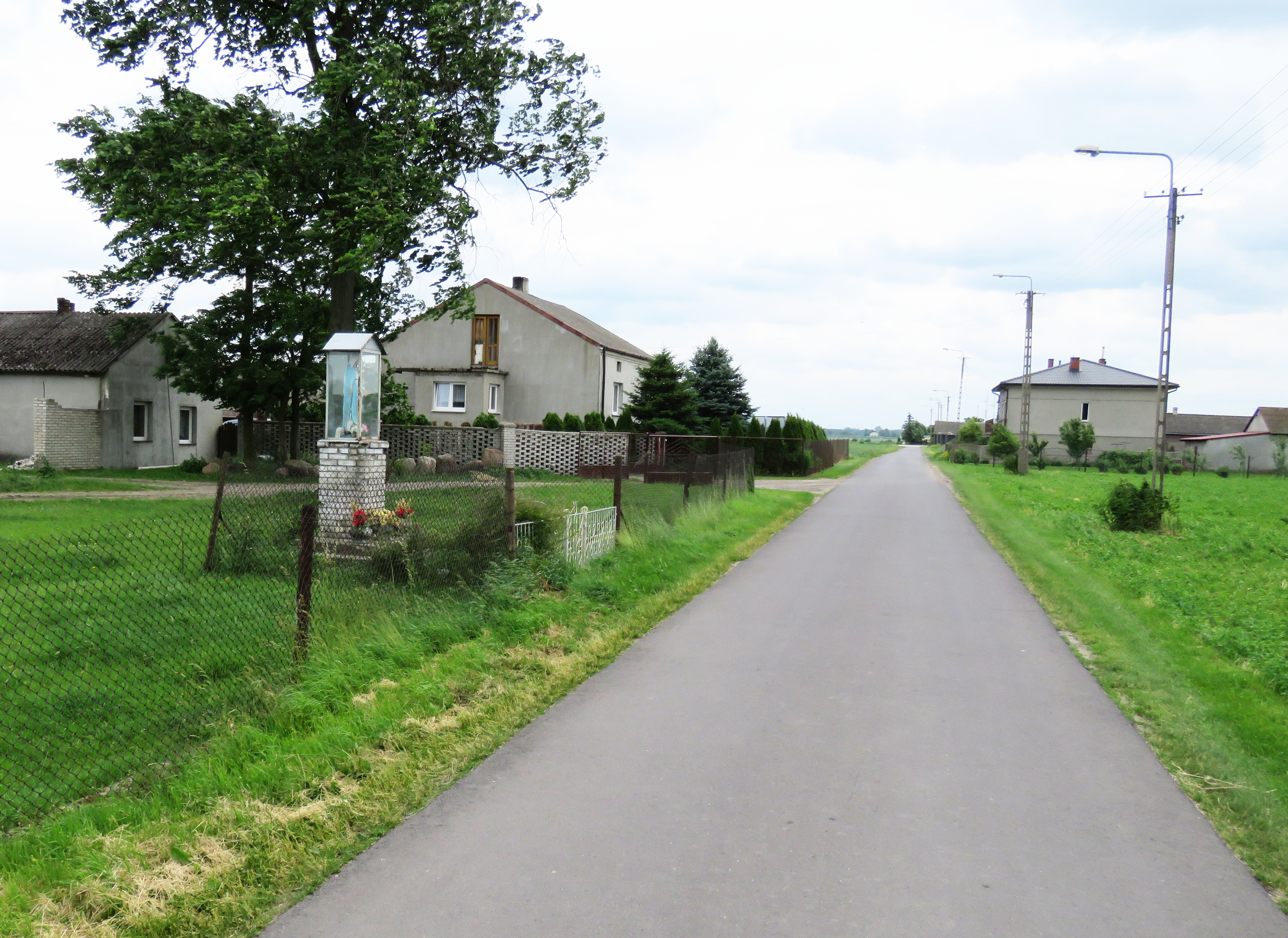
- Nowy Oryszew

- Location within Poland
- Coordinates: 52°07′43″N 20°21′28″E
- Country: Poland
- Voivodeship: Masovian
- County: Żyrardów
- Gmina: Wiskitki

Nowy Oryszew [ˈnɔvɨ ɔˈrɨʂɛf] is a village in the administrative district of Gmina Wiskitki, within Żyrardów County, Masovian Voivodeship, in east-central Poland.
