= Franciszków, Żyrardów County =

Franciszków
- Village
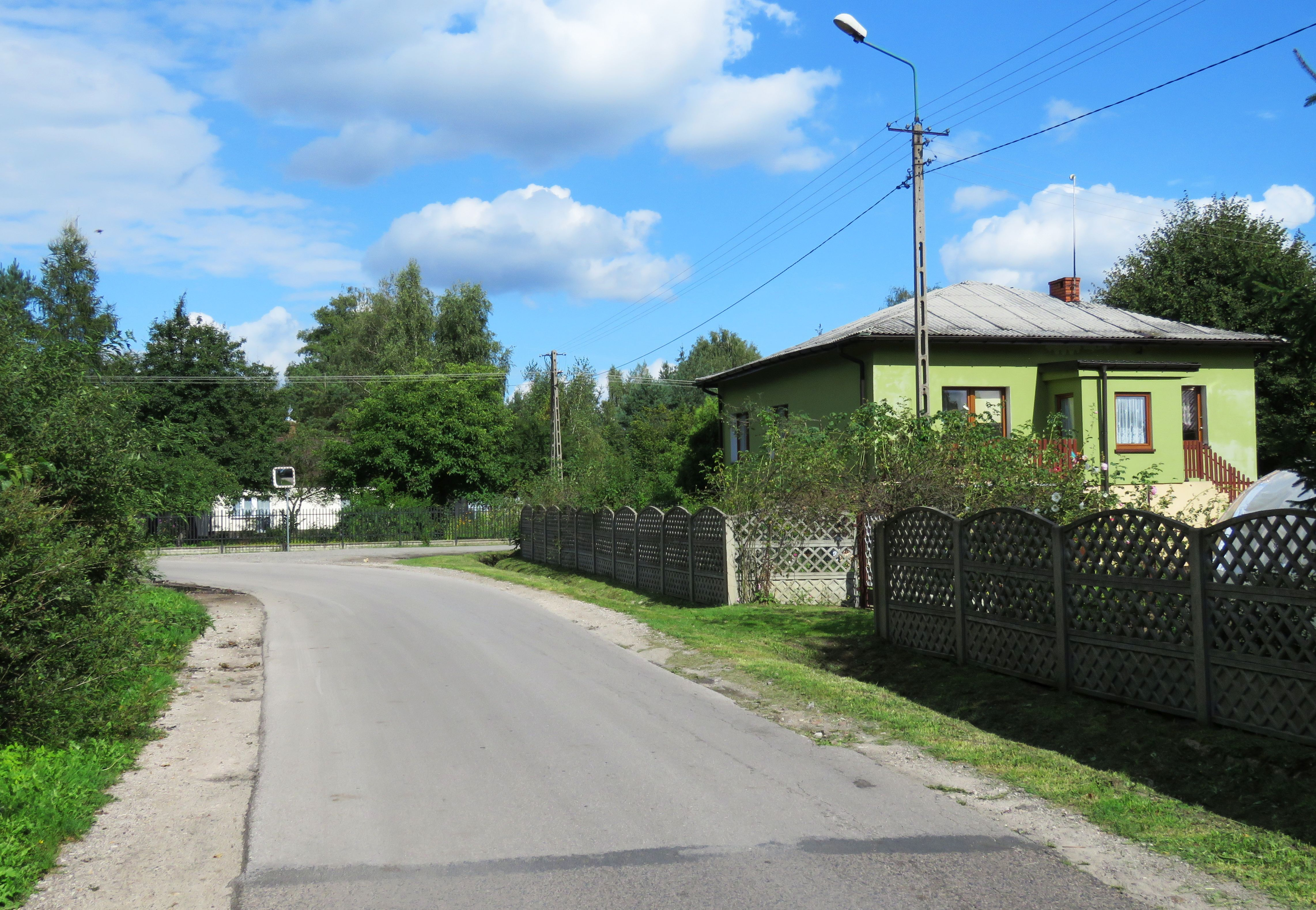

- Location within Poland
- Coordinates: 52°01′14″N 20°19′50″E
- Country: Poland
- Voivodeship: Masovian
- County: Żyrardów
- Gmina: Wiskitki

Franciszków (Polish pronunciation: [fraɲˈt͡ɕiʂkuf]) is a village in the administrative district of Gmina Wiskitki, within Żyrardów County, Masovian Voivodeship, in east-central Poland.
