= Smolarnia, Masovian Voivodeship =

Smolarnia
- Village
- Location within Poland
- Coordinates: 52°2′N 20°18′E
- Country: Poland
- Voivodeship: Masovian
- County: Żyrardów
- Gmina: Wiskitki
- Time zone: UTC+1 (CET)
  - Summer (DST): UTC+2 (CEST)

Smolarnia [smɔˈlarɲa] is a village in the administrative district of Gmina Wiskitki, within Żyrardów County, Masovian Voivodeship, in east-central Poland.

Six Polish citizens were murdered by Nazi Germany in the village during World War II.
