= Morgi, Żyrardów County =

Morgi
- Village
- Location within Poland
- Coordinates: 52°05′23″N 20°22′10″E
- Country: Poland
- Voivodeship: Masovian
- County: Żyrardów
- Gmina: Wiskitki

Morgi [ˈmɔrɡi] is a village in the administrative district of Gmina Wiskitki, within Żyrardów County, Masovian Voivodeship, in east-central Poland.
