= Podoryszew =

- Village
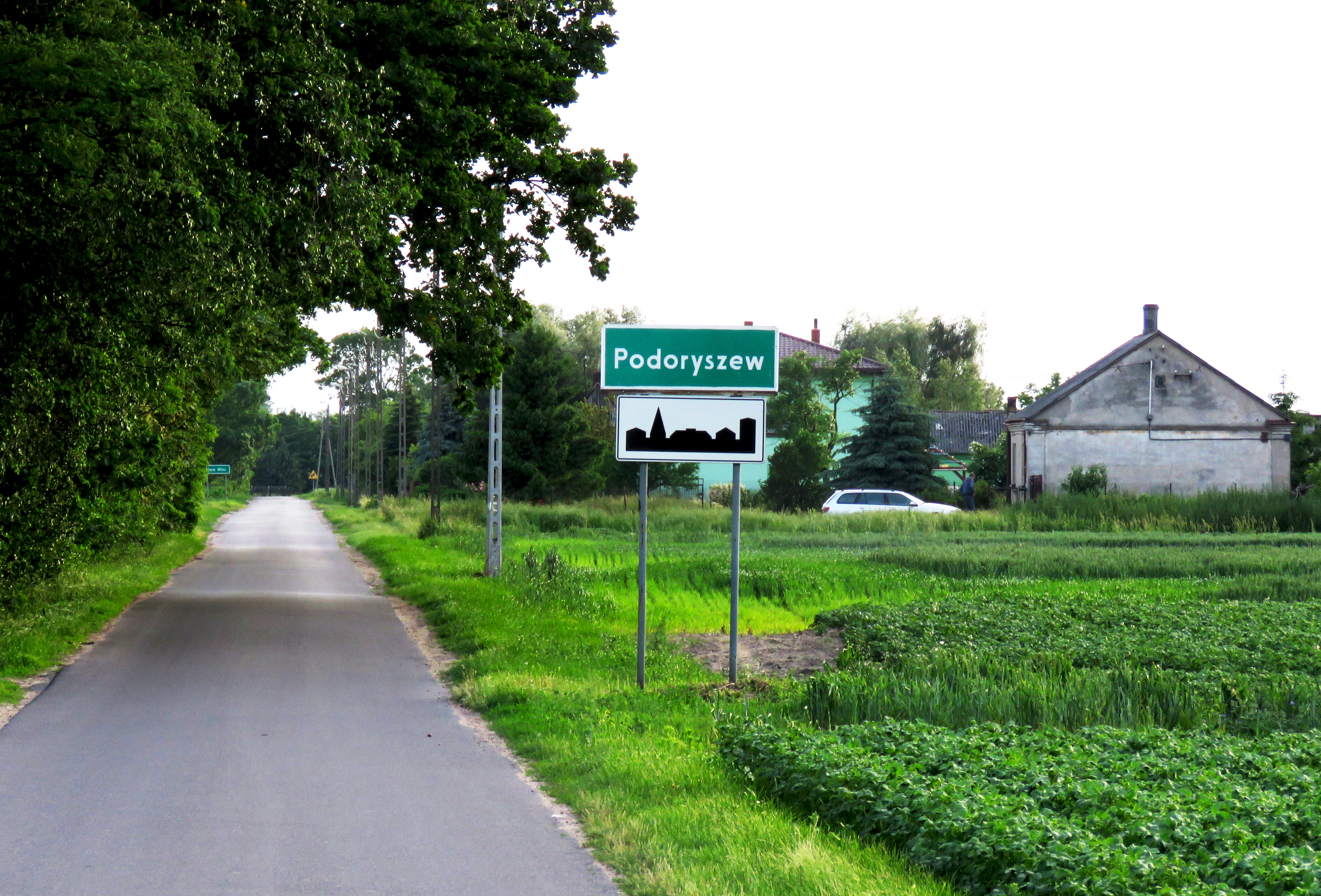
- Podoryszew, commune of Wiskitki

- Location within Poland
- Coordinates: 52°07′06″N 20°23′23″E
- Country: Poland
- Voivodeship: Masovian
- County: Żyrardów
- Gmina: Wiskitki

Podoryszew [pɔdɔˈrɨʂɛf] is a village in the administrative district of Gmina Wiskitki, within Żyrardów County, Masovian Voivodeship, in east-central Poland.
