= Wiskitki =

Town in Masovian Voivodeship, Poland

- Town
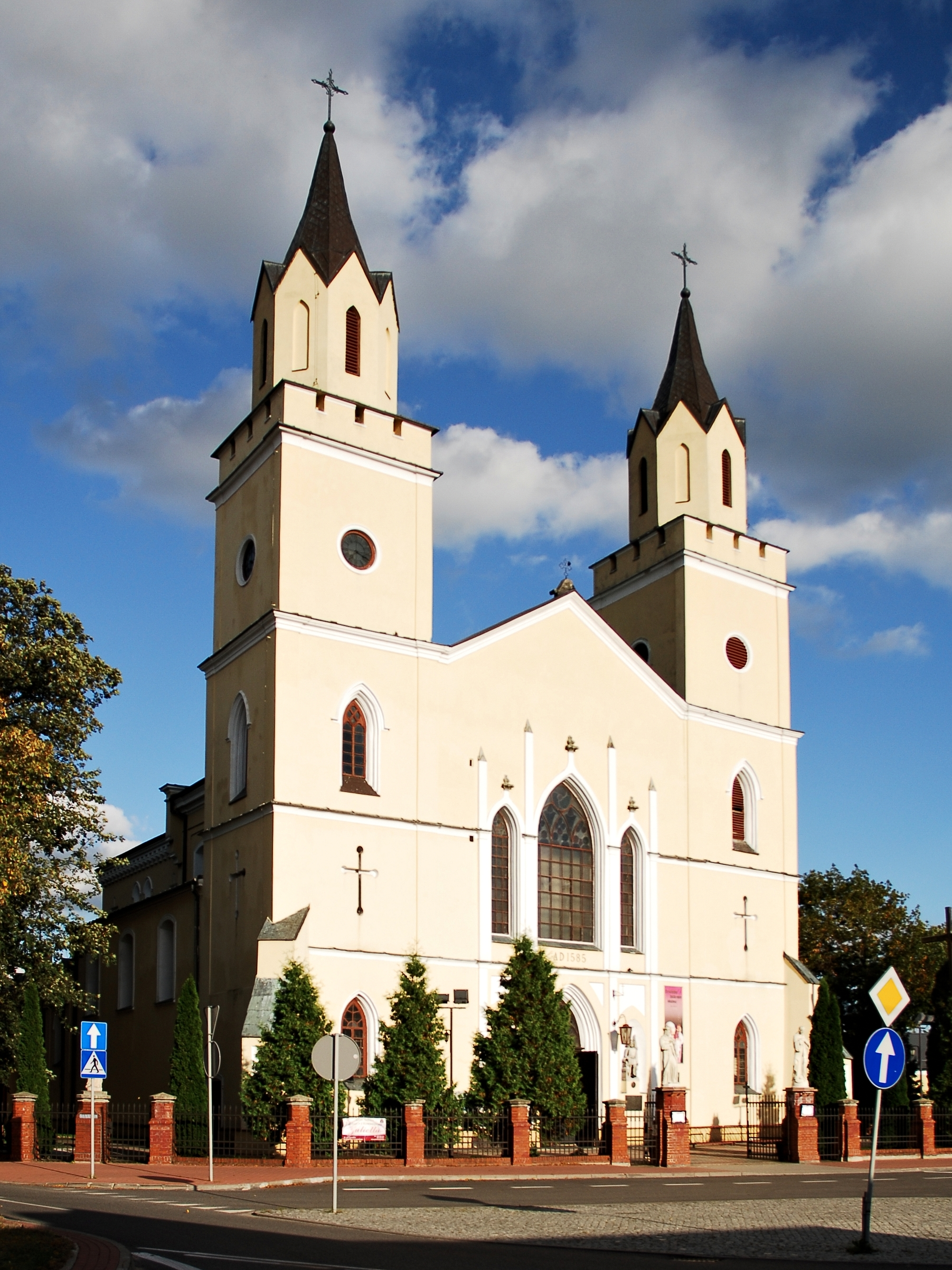
- Church of All Saints

- Flag Coat of arms

- Location within Poland
- Coordinates: 52°5′N 20°24′E
- Country: Poland
- Voivodeship: Masovian
- County: Żyrardów
- Gmina: Wiskitki
- First mentioned: 1221
- Town rights: 1593 or 1595

Population
  - Total: 1,420
- Time zone: UTC+1 (CET)
  - Summer (DST): UTC+2 (CEST)
- Vehicle registration: WZY
- Website: http://www.wiskitki.pl/

Wiskitki [visˈkitki] is a town in Żyrardów County, Masovian Voivodeship, in central Poland. It is the seat of the gmina (administrative district) called Gmina Wiskitki.

The town has a population of 1,420.

== History ==
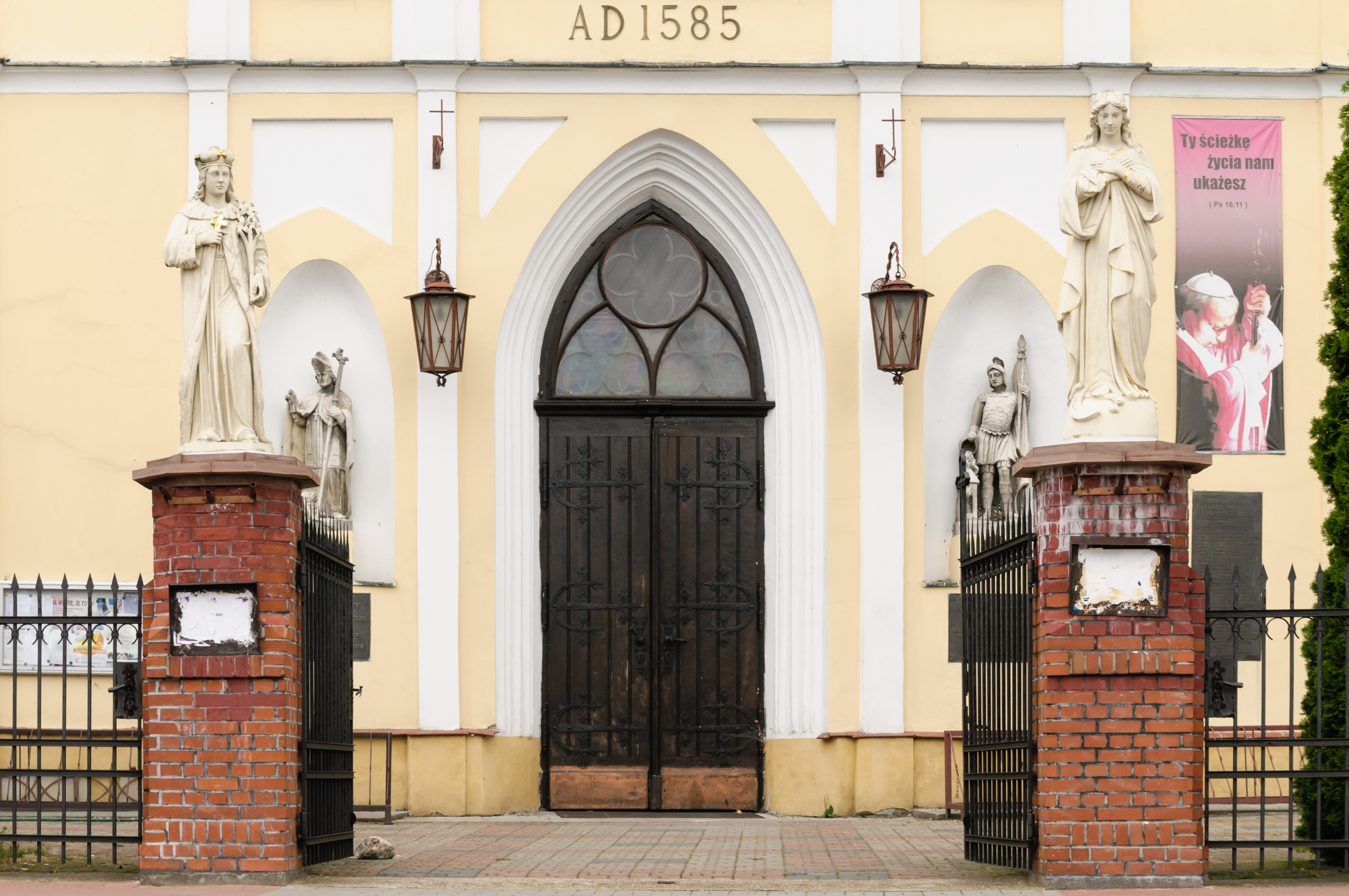
Main gate of the All Saints church

The settlement dates back to the Middle Ages, and was first mentioned in 1221, when it was part of fragmented Piast-ruled Poland. It was granted town rights by Polish King Sigismund III Vasa in 1593 or 1595. It was a royal town of Poland, administratively located in the Sochaczew County in the Rawa Voivodeship in the Greater Poland Province. In the 16th century Polish philosopher and bishop Wawrzyniec Grzymała Goślicki funded the construction of the All Saints church, which remains the greatest historic landmark of the town.

Following the joint German-Soviet invasion of Poland, which started World War II in September 1939, it was occupied by Germany until 1945. At least three Poles from Wiskitki were murdered by the Russians in the large Katyn massacre in 1940.

== Notable residents ==
- Rudolf Gundlach (1892–1957), military engineer, inventor and tank designer
