= Stare Kozłowice =

- Village
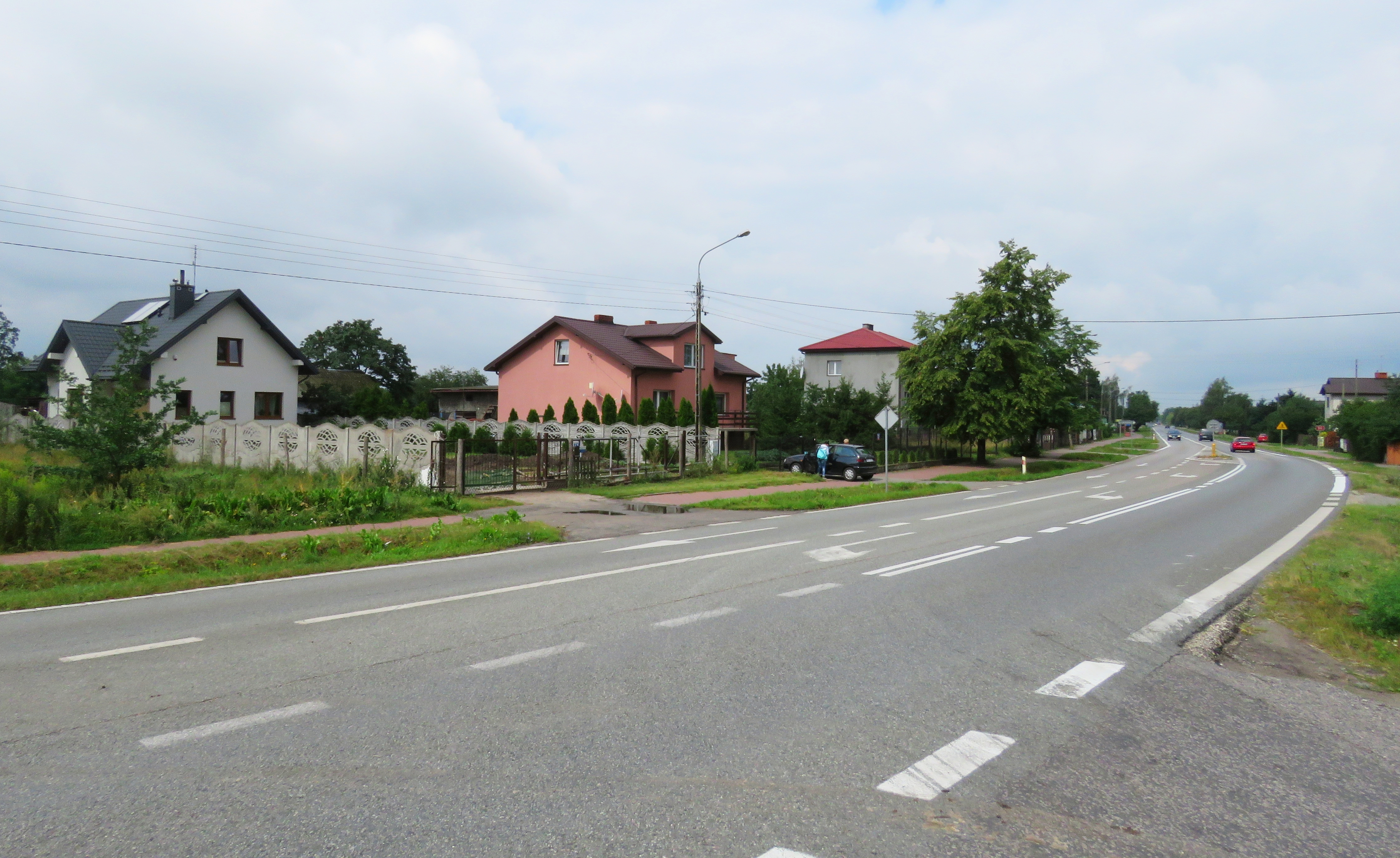

- Location within Poland
- Coordinates: 52°04′54″N 20°24′47″E
- Country: Poland
- Voivodeship: Masovian
- County: Żyrardów
- Gmina: Wiskitki

Stare Kozłowice [ˈstarɛ kɔzwɔˈvit͡sɛ] is a village in the administrative district of Gmina Wiskitki, within Żyrardów County, Masovian Voivodeship, in east-central Poland.
