= Działki, Masovian Voivodeship =

Działki
- Village
- Location within Poland
- Coordinates: 52°04′03″N 20°23′49″E
- Country: Poland
- Voivodeship: Masovian
- County: Żyrardów
- Gmina: Wiskitki
- Time zone: UTC+1 (CET)
  - Summer (DST): UTC+2 (CEST)

Działki [ˈd͡ʑau̯ki] is a village in the administrative district of Gmina Wiskitki, within Żyrardów County, Masovian Voivodeship, in eastern Poland.

Six Polish citizens were murdered by Nazi Germany in the village during World War II.
