= Miedniewice, Masovian Voivodeship =

Miedniewice
- Village
- Location within Poland
- Coordinates: 52°5′0″N 20°18′6″E
- Country: Poland
- Voivodeship: Masovian
- County: Żyrardów
- Gmina: Wiskitki
- Population: 480

Miedniewice [mjɛdɲɛˈvit͡sɛ] is a village in the administrative district of Gmina Wiskitki, within Żyrardów County, Masovian Voivodeship, in east-central Poland.

== Notable residents ==
- Zbigniew Religa (1938–2009), Polish cardiac surgeon and politician
