= Łubno, Masovian Voivodeship =

Łubno
- Village
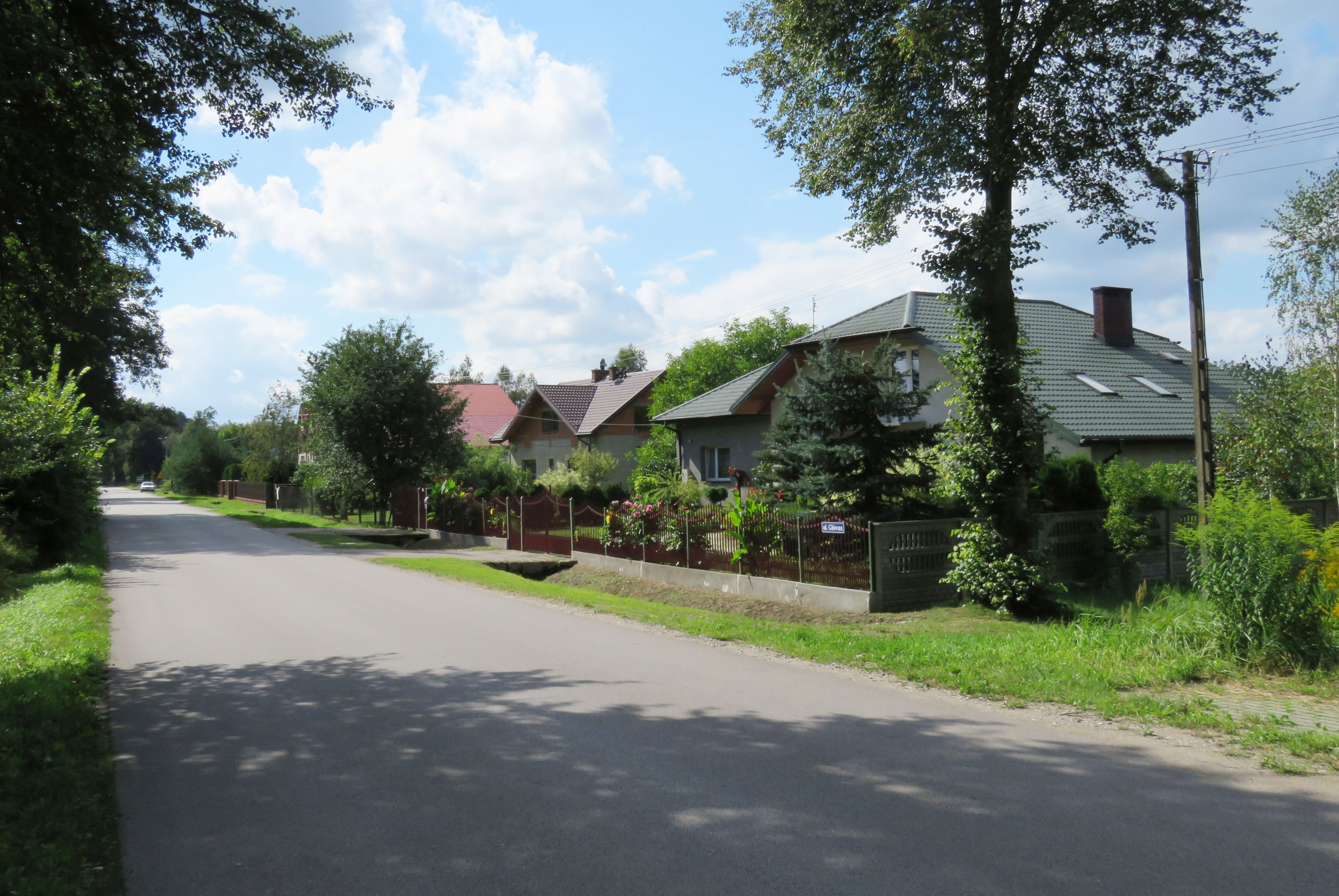

- Location within Poland
- Coordinates: 52°02′24″N 20°21′33″E
- Country: Poland
- Voivodeship: Masovian
- County: Żyrardów
- Gmina: Wiskitki

Łubno [ˈwubnɔ] is a village in the administrative district of Gmina Wiskitki, within Żyrardów County, Masovian Voivodeship, in east-central Poland.
