= Miedniewice-Kolonia =

- Village
- Location within Poland
- Coordinates: 52°05′11″N 20°19′10″E
- Country: Poland
- Voivodeship: Masovian
- County: Żyrardów
- Gmina: Wiskitki

Miedniewice-Kolonia [mjɛdɲɛˈvit͡sɛ kɔˈlɔɲa] is a village in the administrative district of Gmina Wiskitki, within Żyrardów County, Masovian Voivodeship, in east-central Poland.
