= Józefów, Żyrardów County =

Józefów
- Village
- Location within Poland
- Coordinates: 52°01′44″N 20°23′26″E
- Country: Poland
- Voivodeship: Masovian
- County: Żyrardów
- Gmina: Wiskitki

Józefów (Polish pronunciation: [juˈzɛfuf]) is a village in the administrative district of Gmina Wiskitki, within Żyrardów County, Masovian Voivodeship, in east-central Poland.
