= Cyganka, Żyrardów County =

Cyganka
- Village
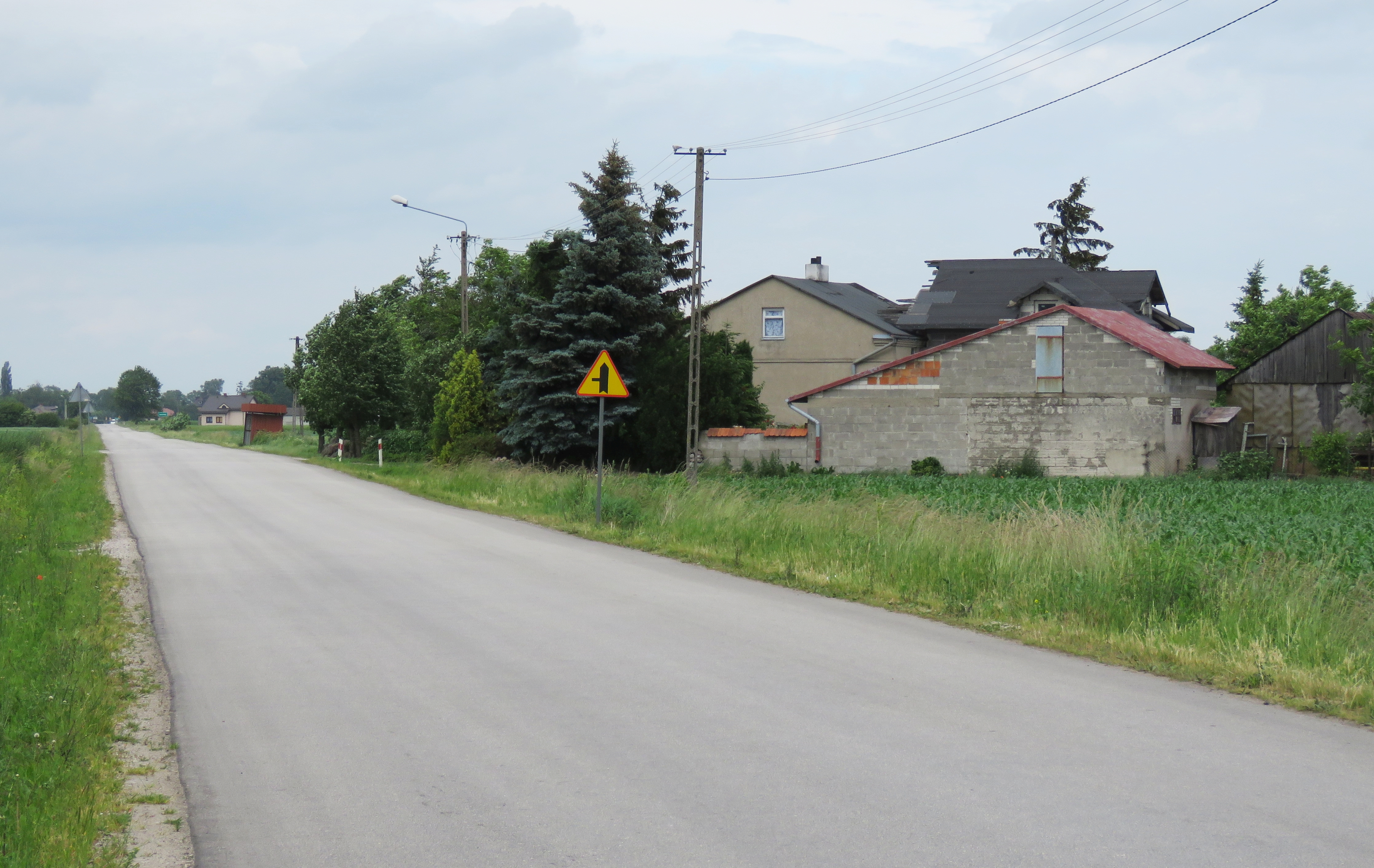
- Road side view of Cyganka

- Location within Poland
- Coordinates: 52°06′08″N 20°21′38″E
- Country: Poland
- Voivodeship: Masovian
- County: Żyrardów
- Gmina: Wiskitki

Cyganka [t͡sɨˈɡanka] is a village in the administrative district of Gmina Wiskitki, within Żyrardów County, Masovian Voivodeship, in east-central Poland.
