= Jesionka, Żyrardów County =

Jesionka
- Village
- Location within Poland
- Coordinates: 52°1′N 20°21′E
- Country: Poland
- Voivodeship: Masovian
- County: Żyrardów
- Gmina: Wiskitki
- Population: 680

Jesionka [jɛˈɕɔnka] is a village in the administrative district of Gmina Wiskitki, within Żyrardów County, Masovian Voivodeship, in east-central Poland.
