= Gmina Wiskitki =

Gmina Wiskitki Wiskitki Commune
- Gmina
- Flag Coat of arms
- Interactive map of Gmina Wiskitki
- Coordinates (Wiskitki): 52°5′N 20°24′E
- Country: Poland
- Voivodeship: Masovian
- County: Żyrardów
- Seat: Wiskitki

Area
  - Total: 150.94 km^{2} (58.28 sq mi)

Population (2006)
  - Total: 9,298
  - Density: 61.60/km^{2} (159.5/sq mi)
- Website: http://www.wiskitki.pl/

Gmina Wiskitki is a rural gmina (administrative district) in Żyrardów County, Masovian Voivodeship, in east-central Poland. Its seat is the village of Wiskitki, which lies approximately 5 kilometres (3 mi) north-west of Żyrardów and 44 km (27 mi) west of Warsaw.

The gmina covers an area of 150.94 square kilometres (58.3 sq mi), and as of 2006 its total population is 9,298.

The gmina contains part of the protected area called Bolimów Landscape Park.

== Villages ==
Gmina Wiskitki contains the villages and settlements of Aleksandrów, Antoniew, Babskie Budy, Cyganka, Czerwona Niwa, Czerwona Niwa-Parcel, Duninopol, Działki, Feliksów, Franciszków, Guzów, Guzów-Osada, Hipolitów, Janówek, Jesionka, Józefów, Kamionka, Kamionka Mała, Łubno, Miedniewice, Miedniewice-Kolonia, Miedniewice-Łąki, Miedniewice-Parcela, Morgi, Nowa Wieś, Nowe Kozłowice, Nowy Drzewicz, Nowy Oryszew, Oryszew-Osada, Podbuszyce, Podoryszew, Popielarnia, Prościeniec, Różanów, Siarkowiec, Smolarnia, Sokule, Stara Wieś, Stare Kozłowice, Starowiskitki, Starowiskitki-Parcel, Stary Drzewicz, Stary Hipolitów, Tomaszew, Wiskitki and Wola Miedniewska.

== Neighbouring gminas ==
Gmina Wiskitki is bordered by the town of Żyrardów and by the gminas of Baranów, Bolimów, Jaktorów, Nowa Sucha, Puszcza Mariańska, Radziejowice and Teresin.
