= Uniates of Podlasie in Wohyń =

The Uniates of Podlasie in Wohyń were a distinct religious community belonging to the Eastern Catholic Church, specifically the Ruthenian Uniate Church, which adhered to the Byzantine Rite while recognizing the authority of the Pope. Located in the Podlasie region, particularly around the town of Wohyń, this group played a significant role in the religious and cultural landscape of the area during the 17th and 18th centuries, before their eventual assimilation into the Roman Catholic Church or conversion to Orthodoxy under the pressures of the political changes in the region.

== Background ==
At the end of the 16th century, Orthodox Christians living in the eastern part of Poland expressed their will to join the Roman Catholic Church. They recognized the Pope as the visible head of the Church. However, they retained the Eastern liturgy and rite, as well as the Old Slavic language. With the approval of the Holy See, the Uniate Church, known as the Greek Catholic Church, was officially accepted at a synod in Brześć nad Bugiem on October 9, 1596. The Orthodox Christians who joined the union were called Uniates, and Catholics of the Latin rite were called Latinists. Over time, Uniates also adopted other Latin customs, such as the Way of the Cross, the Little Hours, and the Rosary. In the decor of the temple, organs, pews, confessionals, and bells appeared. The people of the Latin rite lived in great friendship with the Uniates, united into one Polish nation. Mixed marriages of the Latin and Uniate rites were common. Children were raised in both liturgies, and the same holidays were preserved. After the Russian Partition of the Polish-Lithuanian Commonwealth, the tsars, who were the heads of the Orthodox Church, implemented Russification by drastic methods. They were particularly committed to eliminating the Uniate Church. This lasted until the Tolerance Edict of 1905. Today, the Uniate traditions are continued by the Greek Catholic Church. In the territory of our diocese, there is a Uniate parish in Kostomłoty. Pope John Paul II, on Sunday, October 6, 1996, in Rome, performed the beatification of the martyrs of Pratulin – Wincenty Lewoniuk and 12 companions – indicating their actions as a model of faith and Polishness.

== Places of religious worship in Wohyń ==
=== Pounitic church in Bezwola ===
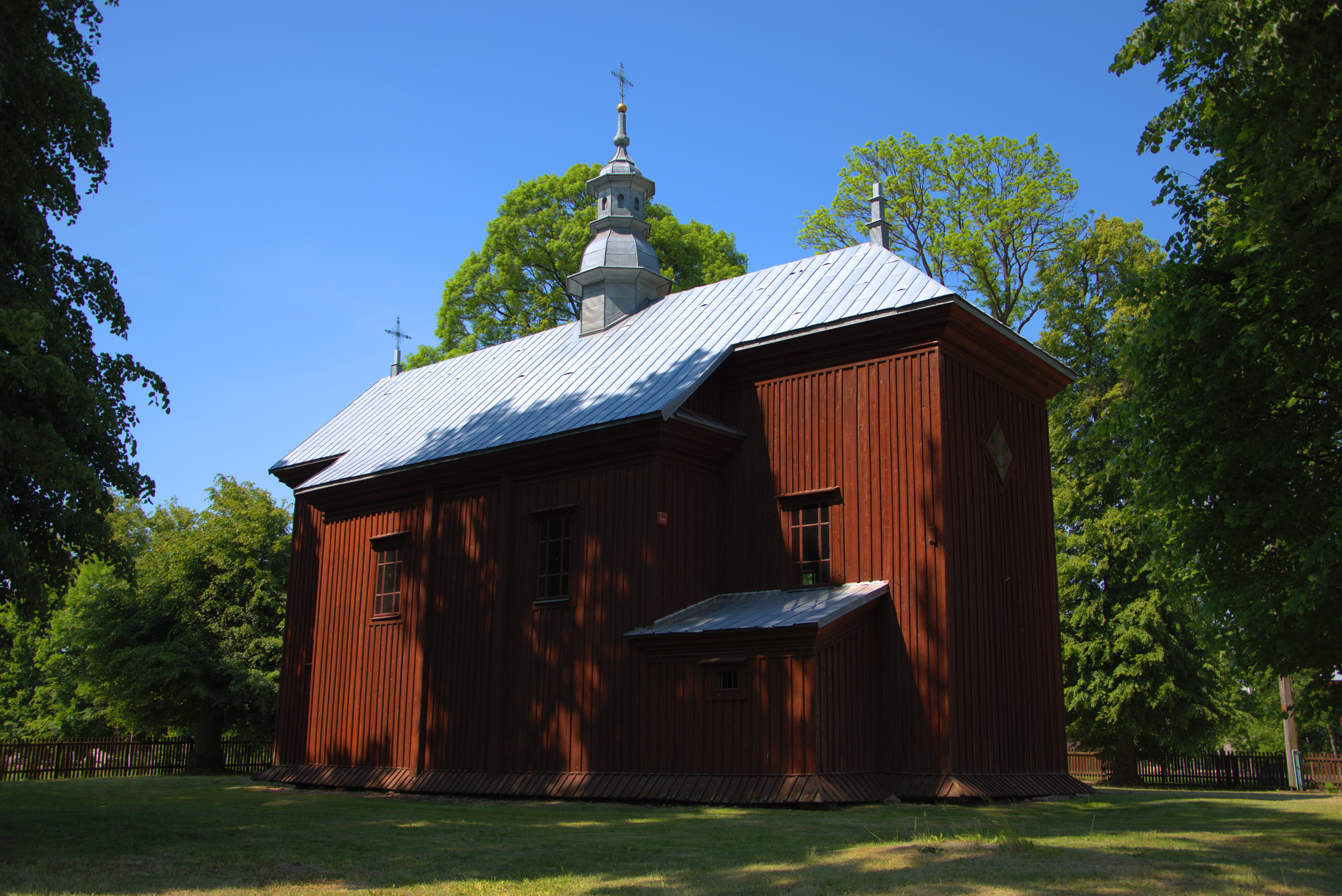
Former Uniate church, now Roman Catholic parish church of the Resurrection of Our Lord

Uniate church built in the 1720s. – Currently the Church of the Resurrection. Originally the temple was decorated with frescoes painted on boards (Holy Trinity – in the chancel and Noah's Ark, Jacob's Ladder and David playing the harp – in the nave in the frame. During the 1993 renovation, 6 frescoes depicting scenes from the life of Christ the Lord were discovered: Miraculous catch of fish, Healing of a paralytic, Restoration of sight to a blind man, Christ in a boat during a storm, Entry of Christ on a donkey into Jerusalem, and Dispersion of the Apostles. There were three Baroque altars in the temple. In the main altar the image of Black Madonna of Czestochowa, replaced by Resurrection of the Lord. On the side left altar – the Holy Spirit, carved angels, the image Christ with an open heart. On the side right altar rococo painting Our Lady of Umilenije, in a metal dress. The building burned down during repairs on September 26, 1995. It took three years to rebuild the temple. The surviving walls were encased, inside the church with larch wood and outside with pine. The church serves the faithful to this day.

=== Pounic Church of Our Lady of Sorrows ===
The temple dedicated to St. Dmitry was built in the first half of the 18th century on the site where the school building stands today. It was moved to the parish cemetery in Wohyń in 1849. In 1998 the church was repaired and three original Uniate altars with icons were restored.

=== The "Cracow" chapel ===
During the persecution of the Uniate Church, the community's spiritual life shifted to a nearby forest. In this secluded location, a wooden chapel was established, where priests secretly gathered with the faithful to conduct religious services, including weddings, baptisms, and confessions.

The chapel can be accessed via Ustrzewska Street in Wohyń. Approximately three kilometers from the intersection with Radzyńska Street and Polna Street, the road leads into the forest. Upon entering the forest, take the first road on the right. After about 150 meters, the chapel will appear in the background on the left side.

The structure features a miniature church with a gabled roof, supported by two columns, and a slender steeple topped with a cross, positioned atop a pillar. At the center of the chapel is an image of Black Madonna of Częstochowa holding the Infant Jesus, with the inscription below: "UNDER THY PROTECTION WE TAKE REFUGE."

== The Uniate cemetery in Bezwola ==
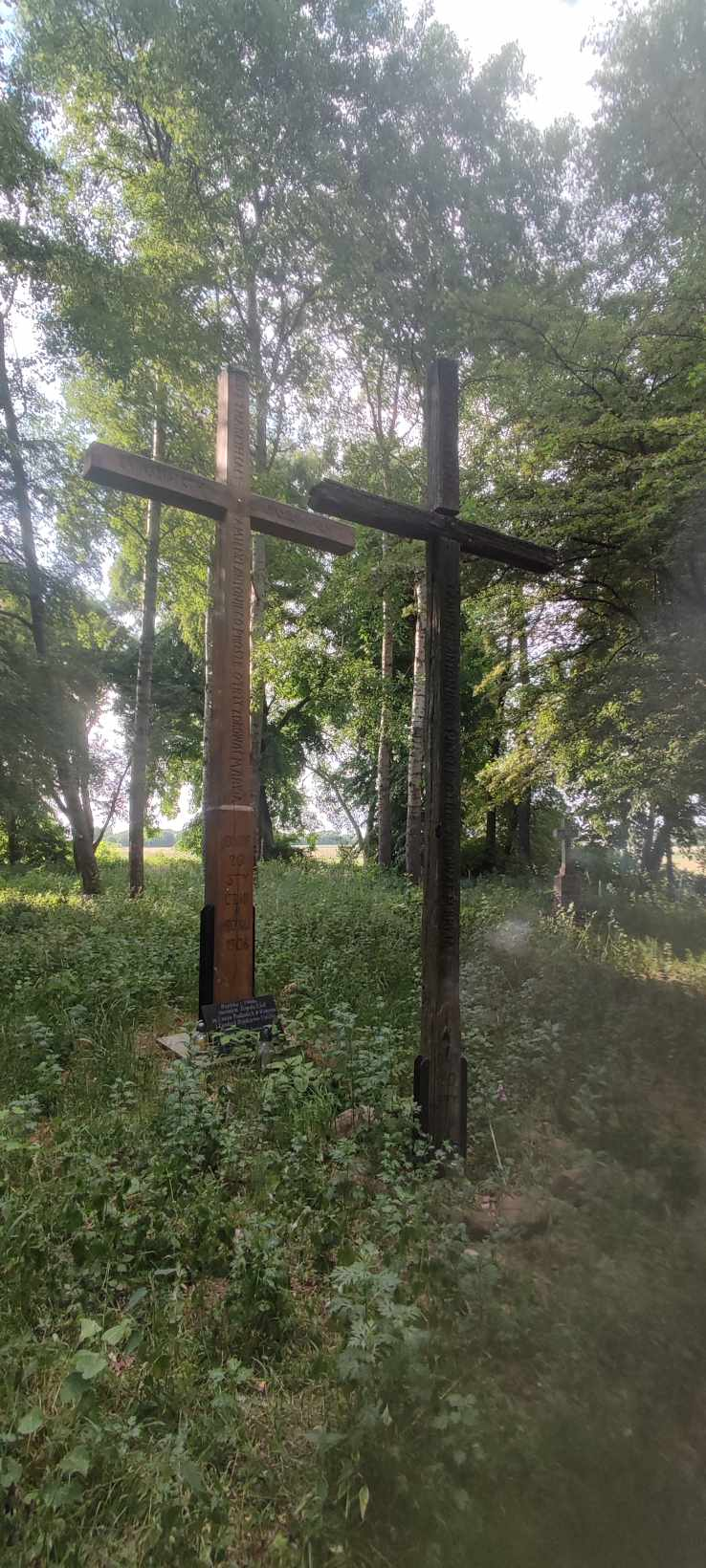
The Uniate cemetery in Bezwola

It is difficult to determine the exact date of the foundation of the Uniate cemetery in Bezwola, but it can be estimated to have been in the 19th century. The cemetery is small, measuring about 60 by 40 metres (200 ft × 130 ft), and is currently out of use. It is located approximately 0.9 km (0.56 mi) east of the filial Church of the Holy Resurrection, a former Uniate church. It should be mentioned that the Greek Catholic Church was formed primarily by peasants. After 1830, the plague killed entire families, and the dead were buried in this cemetery regardless of religion.

The Uniate necropolis in Bezwola shared the fate of the parish, and its history is closely connected with the temple. After 1875 and the annulment of the Union, the church in Bezwola was turned into an Eastern Orthodox church, and the cemetery served the believers who were forcefully persuaded to the Orthodox rite. During times of repression, the Uniates were deprived of a priest and often buried their dead themselves. Sometimes they buried them at night by moonlight or lamplight, covering up all traces of the grave.

The necropolis in Bezwola was entered from the north through a stone gate. To this day, large stones marking the entrance are still visible. During the repression of the Uniates, tsarist guards often stood in front of the gates day and night, preventing the Uniates from burying their dead without the assistance of a priest. However, the tsarist authorities could not cope with secret burials. A decree was issued, ordering the guards to dig up a Uniate's coffin, move it to an Orthodox cemetery, and impose heavy fines on the family. At this time, an Orthodox section was separated in the Uniate cemetery, marked with an embankment of earth.

Latin crosses were usually placed on the graves of Uniates. They varied in height, which probably indicated the wealth of those to whom they were dedicated. Most were tombstones with low crosses, all situated in rows and facing east. One cross from 1906, which was dug directly into the ground, still stands in the cemetery today. Also preserved are two gravestones from the early 20th century, displayed by families to the deceased: one with a recumbent tombstone and the other placed on perpendicular pedestals with a plinth.

The old cemetery (this is how the cemetery is often referred to by locals) was very neglected. It was overgrown with trees, bushes, and weeds. The Uniate cemetery in Bezwola is surrounded by a wall of fieldstones. This was the cheapest and most easily available material for construction to the landowners. The memory of the locals stores events associated with the defense of the cemetery wall. One hundred years ago, during one night, it was covered with earth by local residents, who in this way prevented the removal of stones for road construction.

In 2008, the cross and tombstones were renovated, the cemetery was restored to a dignified appearance, and fragments of the wall were uncovered. This cemetery is also a unique natural and scenic entity. It looks like an island among the fields and meadows. Today's century-old hawthorns, buckthorns, and the oldest small-leaved linden, which on October 25, 2007, was established as a monument of nature, have been the guardians of the necropolis for many years and have preserved the memory of those times.

For several years, the Unitów Podlaskich School Complex in Wohyń has taken permanent care of the cemetery.

== A letter from 1862 ==
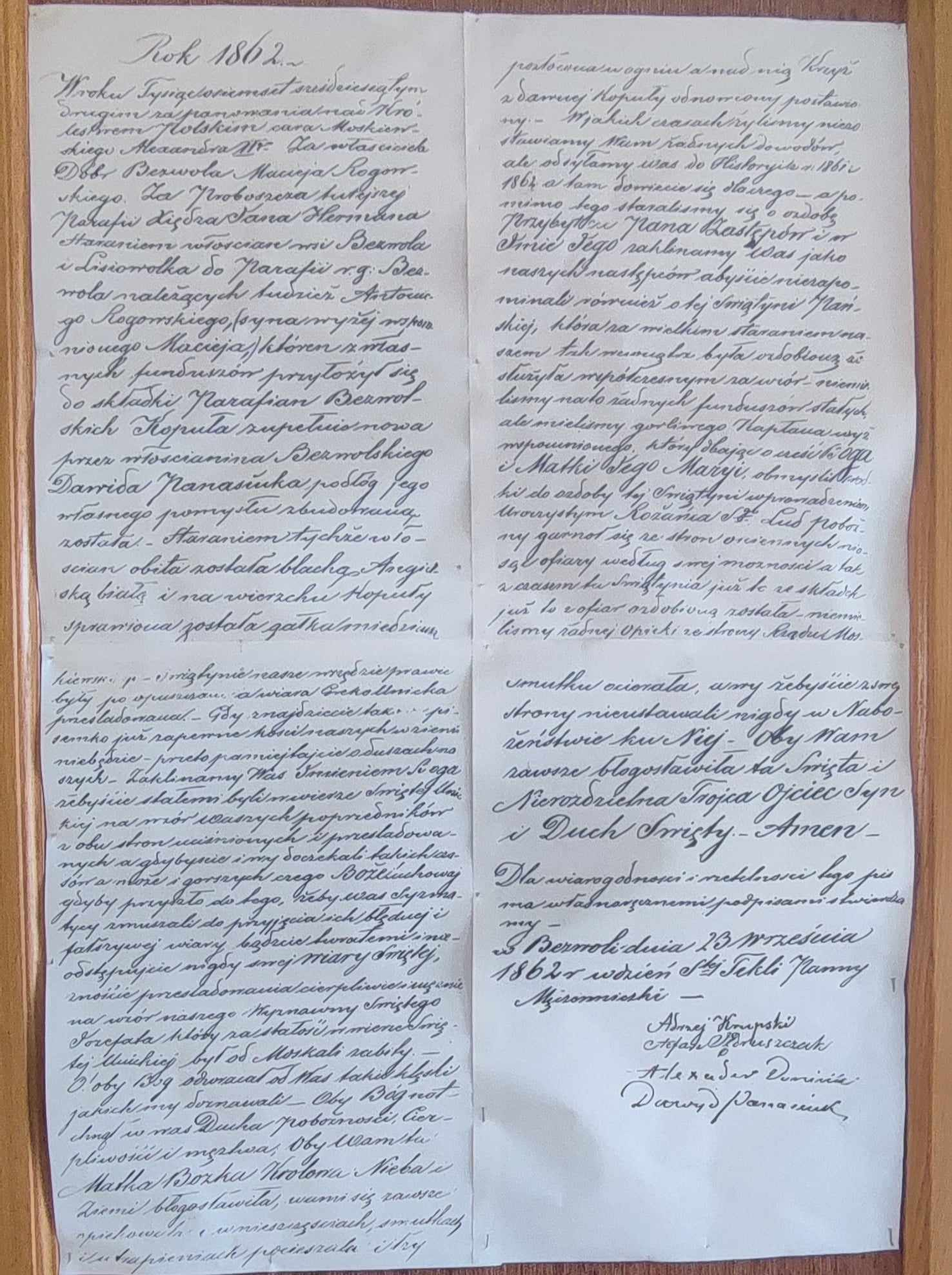
Letter from the parishioners of the Uniate Church in Bezwola from 1862

In the 1960s, a letter dating back to 1862 was discovered in the dome of the church in Bezwola. The letter had been placed in a glass-sealed bottle and contained a message intended for future generations.

The document provides detailed information about the church and the history of Bezwola. At the time of the letter's writing in 1862, the church was undergoing extensive renovations, both inside and outside. The individuals responsible for the renovation left this letter, authored by Jan Herman, the pastor of the Uniate parish in Bezwola.

In the letter, Herman expressed deep concern about the repression of the Greek Catholic faith and the widespread closure of Uniate churches. The letter conveys significant anxiety regarding the future of the Uniate Church and the Bezwola temple. The Uniates implored their descendants to remember their souls, remain loyal to their faith, and take care of the church.

The document was signed by four parishioners:

- David Panasiuk - a landowner from Bezwola, carpenter, and sculptor, he was the designer and builder of the church dome and the crucifix that was hung in the church porch. The crucifix was miraculously saved from a fire and is now located on the rainbow beam above the main aisle.
- Andrzej Krupski - The caretaker of the church and parish, a wealthy farmer, and later the head of the Lisiowólka municipality.
- Stefan Jędruszczak - Likely the church organist.
- Aleksander Dominik - No further information is available about him.

== Commemorating ==
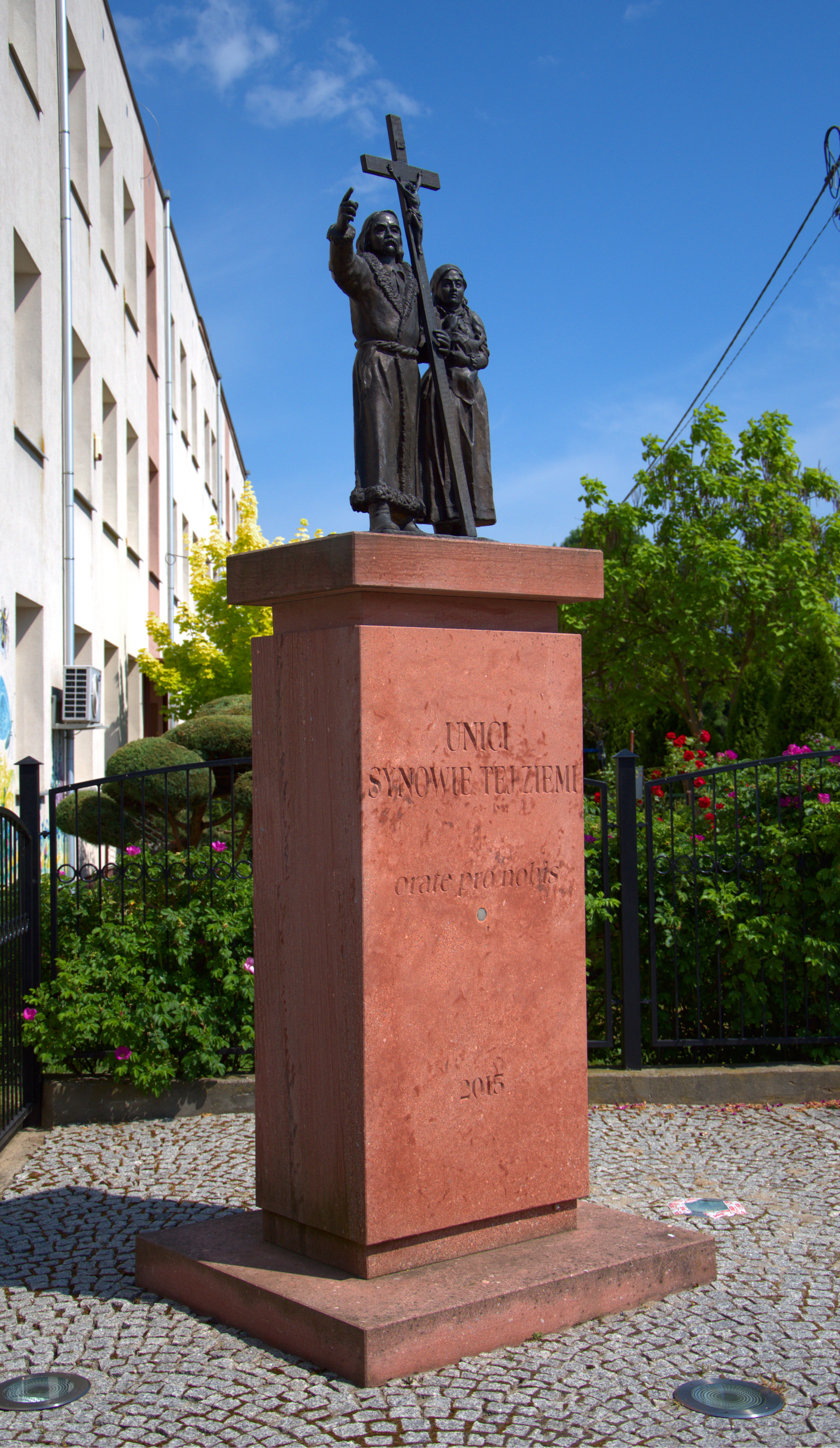
Monument to the Podlasie Uniates in front of the school in Wohyń

- The name of the Podlasie Uniates is borne by the School Complex in Wohyń (Polish: Zespół Szkół im. Unitów Podlaskich w Wohyniu).
- A monument has been built at the School Complex, depicting a Unite family, placed on a two-meter pedestal above which is a cross – a symbol of faith. The pedestal bears the inscription "Unates – sons of this land orate pro nobis". A time capsule has been embedded in the pedestal, which contains soil from the site of the martyrdom of the Unites in Pratulin, a copy of the letter of 1862, as well as a reply to the letter of October 2015 signed with the names of all students, teachers and staff of the school and the founders of the monument.
