= Wachowski =

Origin
- Language: Polish
- Meaning: from Wachów
- Region of origin: Poland,

Other names
- Variant forms: Russian: Ваховский Vakhovsky, Wachowicz

Wachowski (feminine: Wachowska, plural: Wachowscy) is a Polish surname originating from the village of Wachów, Poland. Notable people with the surname include:

- Lilly and Lana Wachowski (born 1967 and 1965), American film directors, writers and producers
- Mieczysław Wachowski (born 1950), Polish politician

== Fictional characters ==
- Tom and Maddie Wachowski, the secondary protagonists of the Sonic the Hedgehog series.

== See also ==
- Warszawski
