= Świercze =

Świercze may refer to:

- Świercze, Lublin Voivodeship (east Poland)
- Świercze, Pułtusk County in Masovian Voivodeship (east-central Poland)
- Gmina Świercze, Pułtusk County
- Świercze, Siedlce County in Masovian Voivodeship (east-central Poland)
- Świercze, Opole Voivodeship (south-west Poland)
- Swiercze Commune

== See also ==
- Świerże (disambiguation)
