= Świerże =

Świerże may refer to:

- Świerże, Chełm County in Lublin Voivodeship (east Poland)
- Świerże, Radzyń County in Lublin Voivodeship (east Poland)
- Świerże, Masovian Voivodeship (east-central Poland)

== See also ==
- Świercze (disambiguation)
