= Stefan Baley =

Polish psychologist

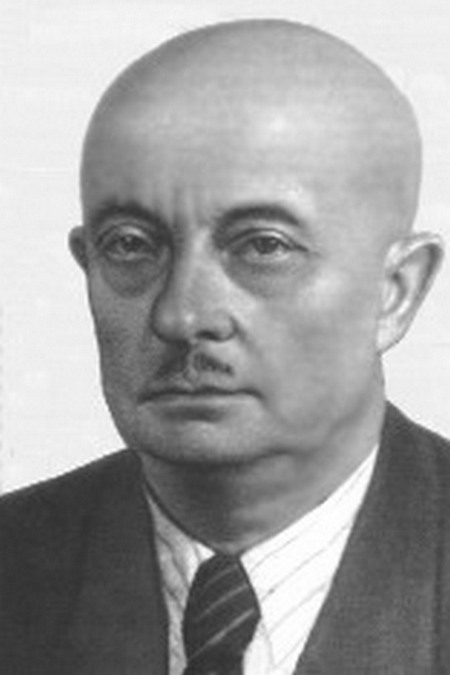
- Born: 4 February 1885; Borki Wielkie, Austrian Poland
- Died: 13 September 1952 (aged 67); Warsaw, Poland
- Education: University of Lviv

Stefan Baley (born 4 February 1885 in Borki Wielkie, died 13 September 1952 in Warsaw) was a Polish psychologist, doctor and pedagogue.
