= Broniec =

- Village
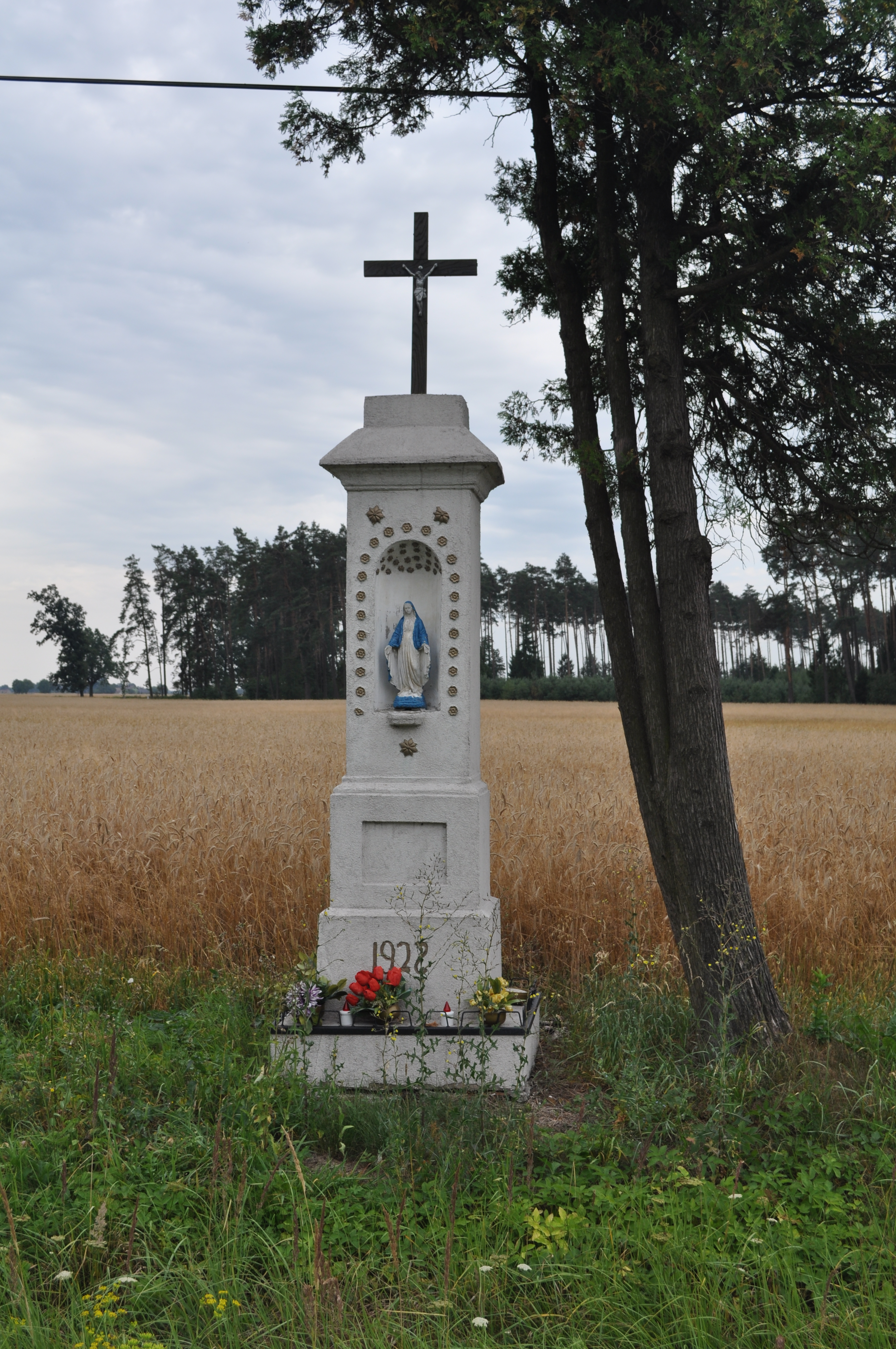
- Shrine in Broniec

- Location within Poland
- Coordinates: 50°53′N 18°31′E
- Country: Poland
- Voivodeship: Opole
- County: Olesno
- Gmina: Olesno
- Population: 180

Broniec [ˈbrɔɲɛt͡s] is a village in the administrative district of Gmina Olesno, within Olesno County, Opole Voivodeship, in south-western Poland.
