= Planta, Lublin Voivodeship =

Planta
- Village
- Location within Poland
- Coordinates: 51°45′14″N 22°52′04″E
- Country: Poland
- Voivodeship: Lublin
- County: Radzyń
- Gmina: Wohyń

Planta [ˈplanta] is a village in the administrative district of Gmina Wohyń, within Radzyń County, Lublin Voivodeship, in eastern Poland.
