= Borki Małe =

- Village
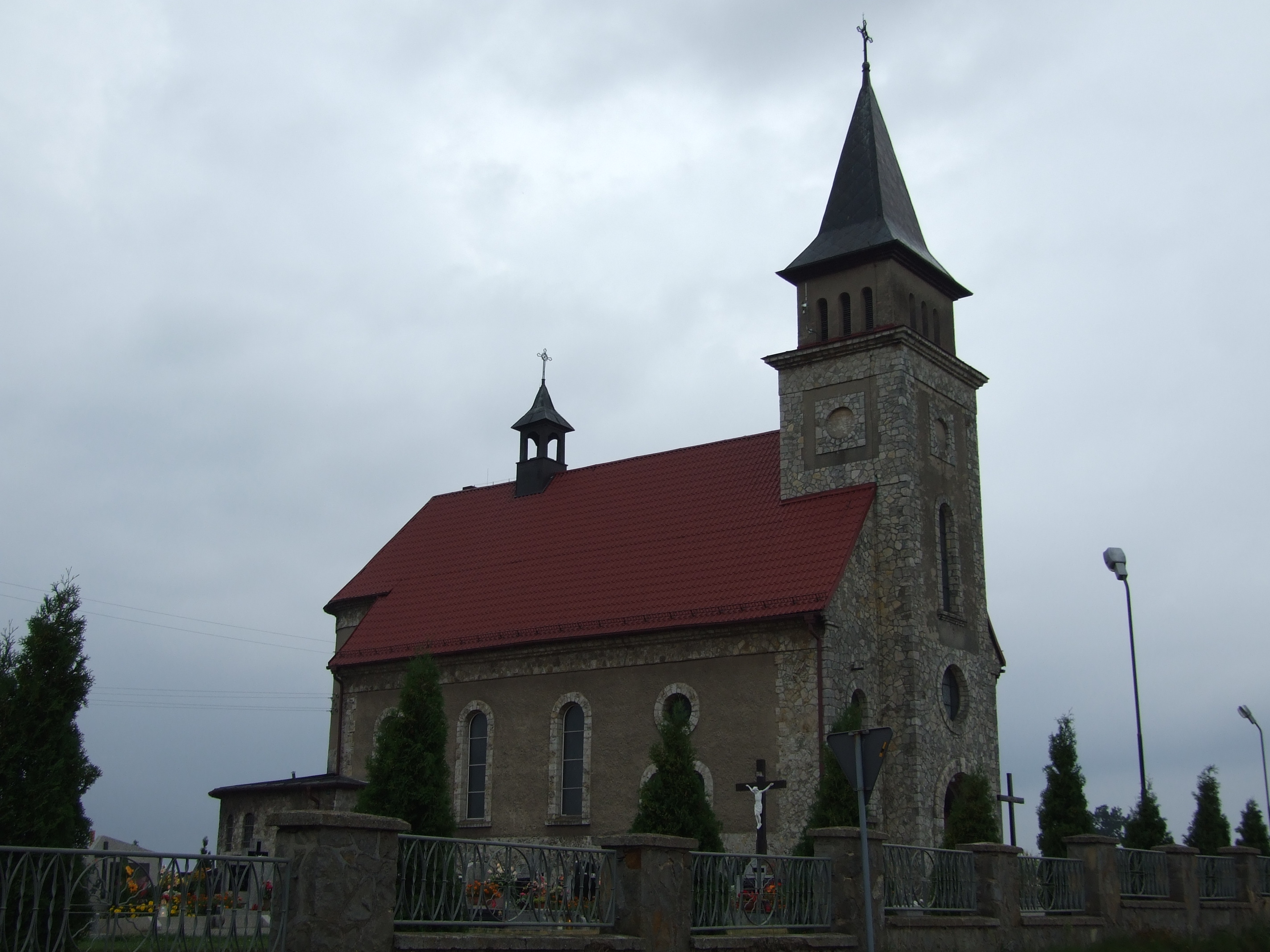

- Location within Poland
- Coordinates: 50°52′33″N 18°30′2″E
- Country: Poland
- Voivodeship: Opole
- County: Olesno
- Gmina: Olesno
- Population: 540

Borki Małe ([ˈbɔrki ˈmawɛ]; German: Klein Borek) is a village in the administrative district of Gmina Olesno, within Olesno County, Opole Voivodeship, in south-western Poland.
