= Boroszów =

- Village
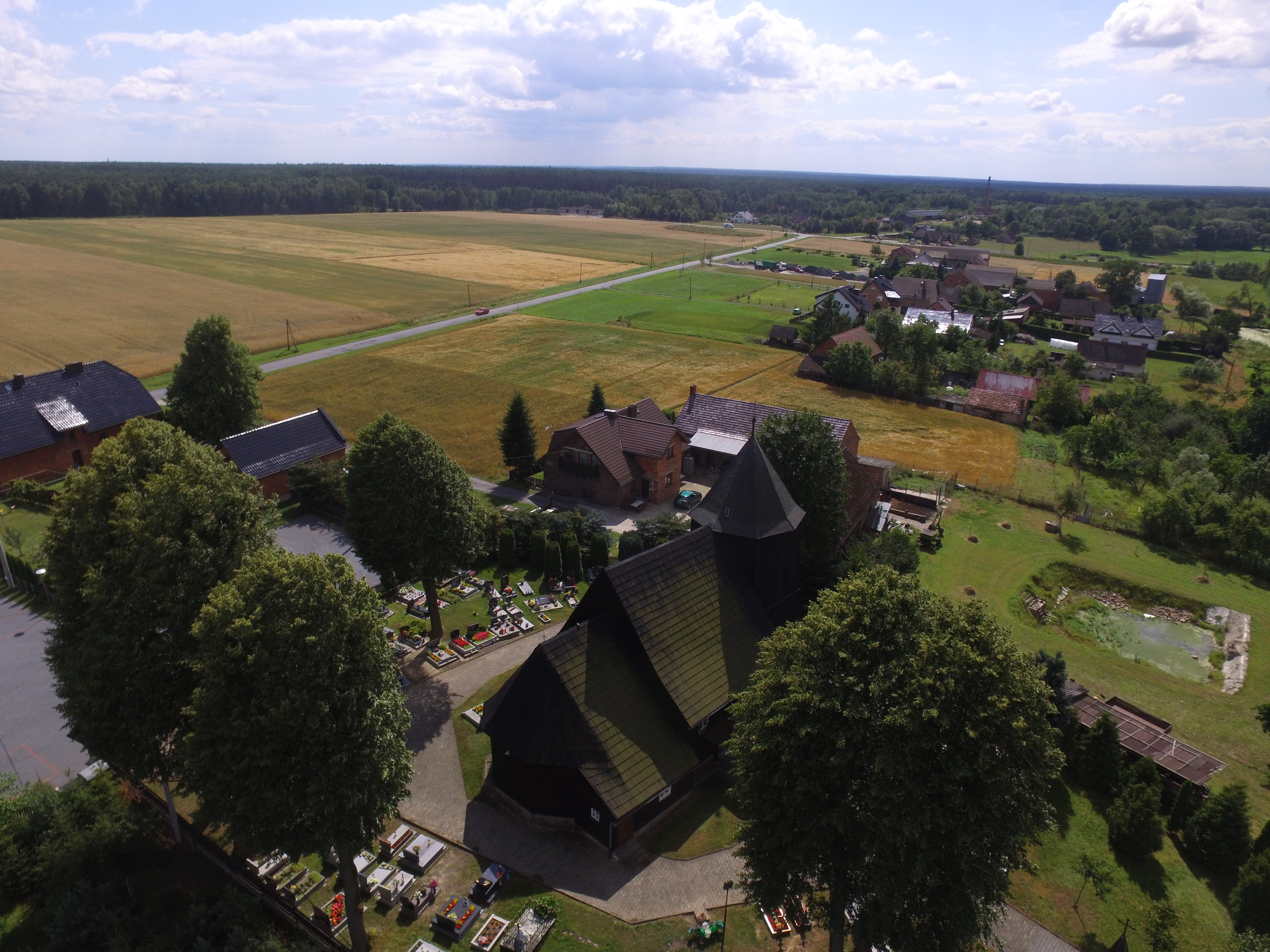

- Location within Poland
- Coordinates: 50°57′N 18°26′E
- Country: Poland
- Voivodeship: Opole
- County: Olesno
- Gmina: Olesno
- Website: http://boroszow.borkiwielkie.pl

Boroszów [bɔˈrɔʂuf] (German: Boroschau, 1936–1945 Alteneichen) is a village in the administrative district of Gmina Olesno, within Olesno County, Opole Voivodeship, in south-western Poland. It is situated approximately 9 km (6 mi) north of Olesno and 48 km (30 mi) north-east of the regional capital Opole.

In village is old wooden church.

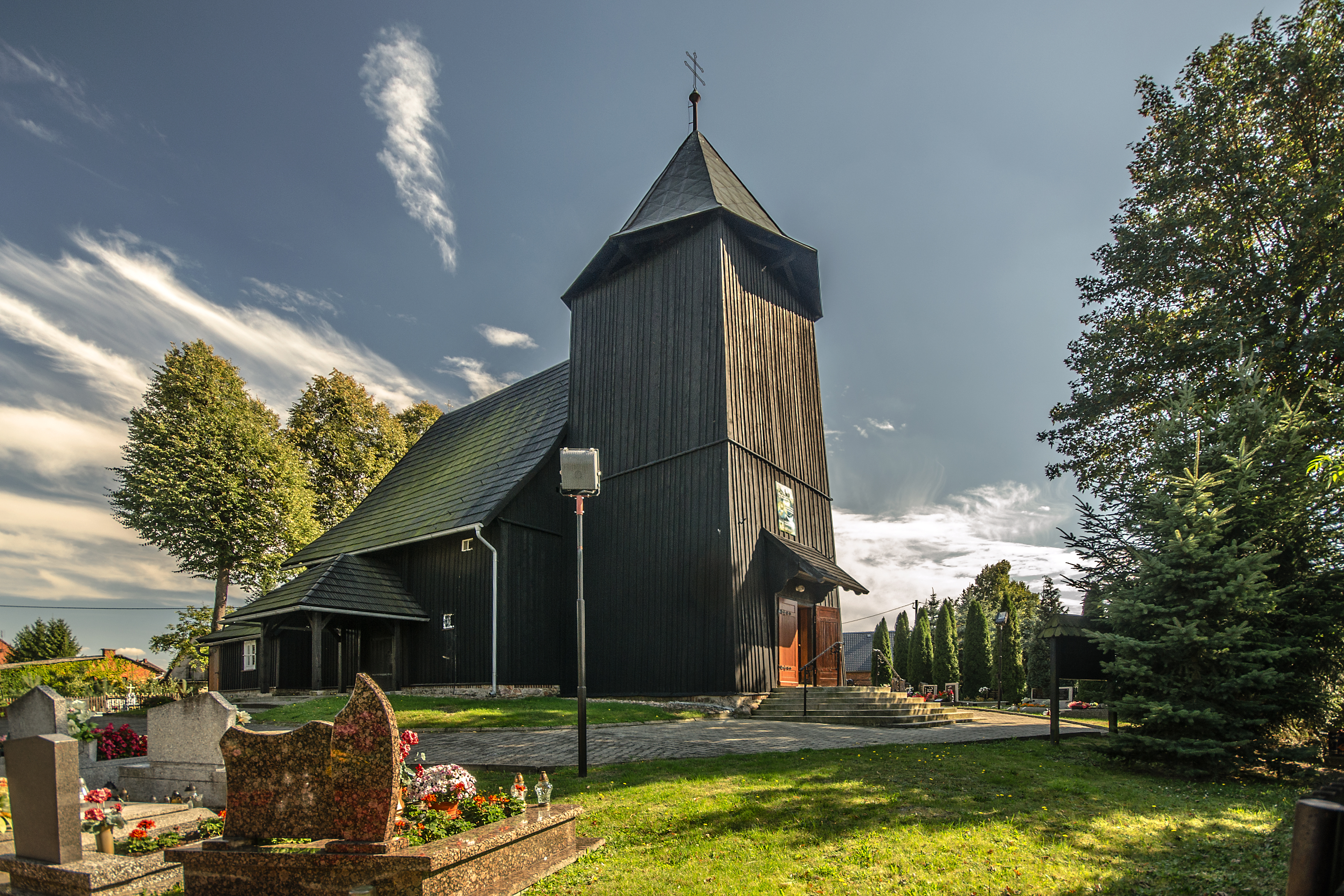
Wooden church in Boroszów
