= Wachowice =

- Village
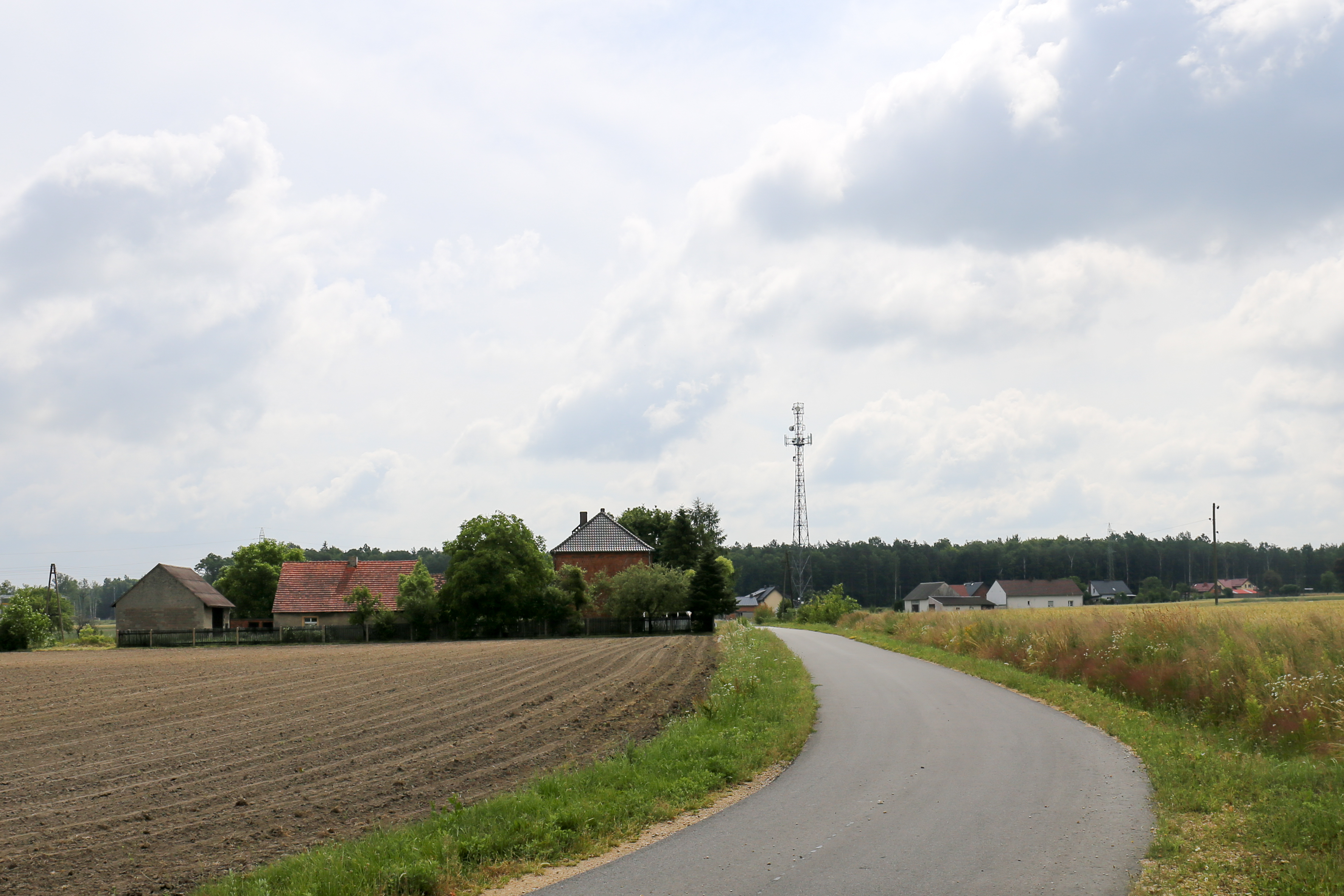

- Location within Poland
- Coordinates: 50°50′58″N 18°24′11″E
- Country: Poland
- Voivodeship: Opole
- County: Olesno
- Gmina: Olesno
- Population (approx.): 300

Wachowice [vaxɔˈvit͡sɛ] is a village in the administrative district of Gmina Olesno, within Olesno County, Opole Voivodeship, in south-western Poland.
