= Kucoby =

- Village
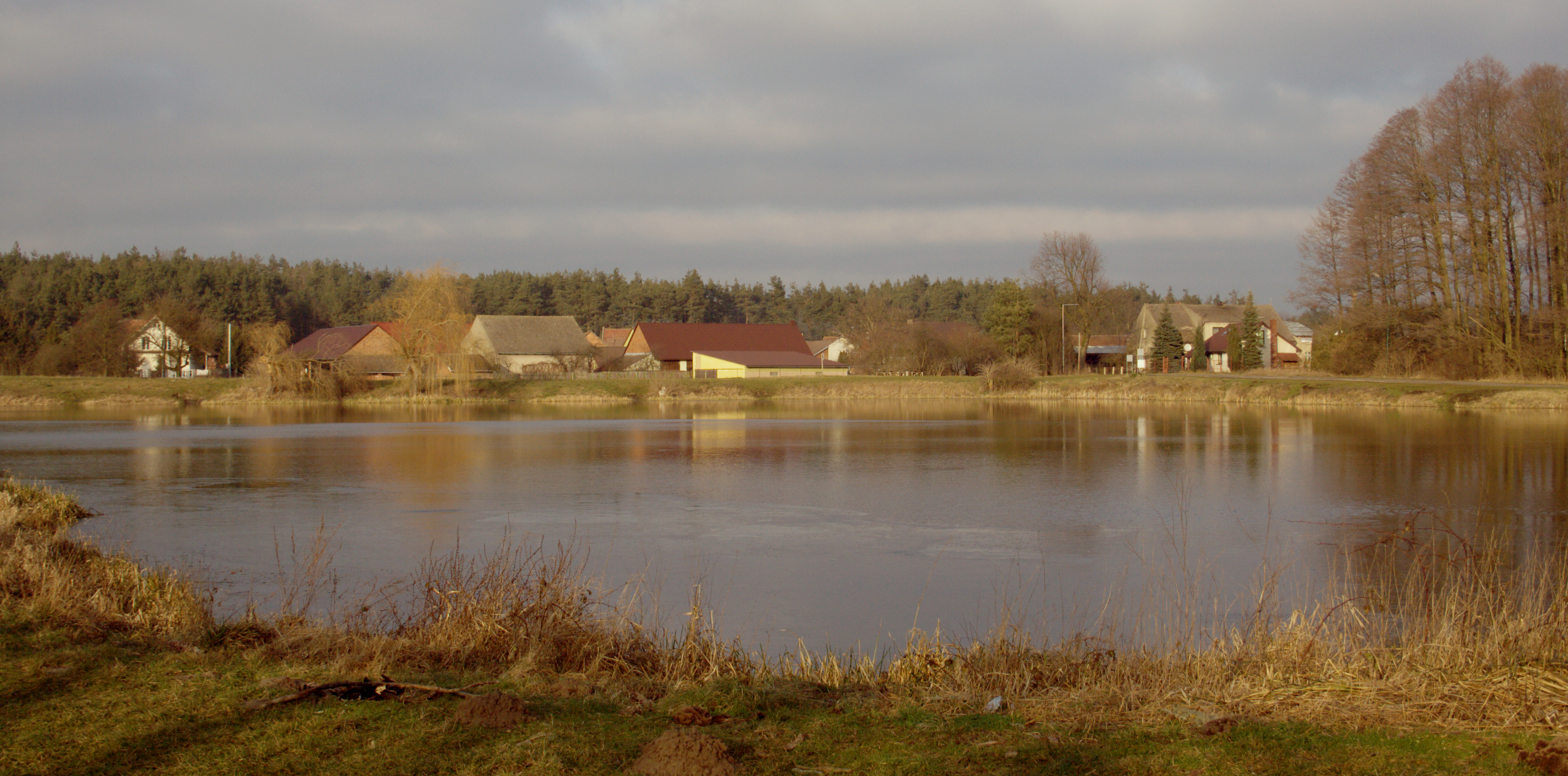
- Pond in the village

- Location within Poland
- Coordinates: 50°52′35″N 18°37′12″E
- Country: Poland
- Voivodeship: Opole
- County: Olesno
- Gmina: Olesno

Kucoby [kuˈt͡sɔbɨ] is a village in the administrative district of Gmina Olesno, within Olesno County, Opole Voivodeship, in south-western Poland.
