= Warszawski =

Warszawski (Polish pronunciation: [varˈʂaf.skʲi]), feminine: Warszawska is a Polish-language toponymic surname literally meaning "of/from Warsaw". It may by transliterated as Warshavsky / Warshavska, etc.

Notable people with this surname include:

- Adolf Warski (born Jerzy Warszawski; 1868–1937), Polish communist leader, journalist
- Alexander Varshavsky (born 1946), Russian-American biochemist
- Dawid Warszawski, pseudonym of Konstanty Gebert, Polish journalist and a Jewish activist
- Deena Varshavskaya, American entrepreneur
- Gregori Warchavchik (1896–1972), Jewish-Brazilian architect
- Icchok Warszawski, pseudonym of Isaac Bashevis Singer (1903–1991), Polish-born Jewish-American writer in Yiddish
- Israel and Roy Warshawsky, owners of JC Whitney, American retailer of aftermarket automotive parts and accessories
- Józef Warszawski (1903–1997), Polish philosopher
- Mark Warshawsky (1848–1907), Yiddish-language folk poet and composer
- Michel Warschawski (Mikado) (born 1949), Israeli anti-Zionist activist
- Mikhail Varshavski (born 1989), "Doctor Mike", American doctor and internet celebrity
- Sergei Varshavsky (1906–1980), Russian writer and collector
- Seth Warshavsky, (born 1973), American pioneer in the internet pornography industry
- Stanislava Varshavski, Israeli-American piano player
- V. I. Warshawski, fictional private investigator in novels and short stories by Sara Paretsky

== See also ==
- Wachowski
