= Leśna, Opole Voivodeship =

Leśna
- Village
- Location within Poland
- Coordinates: 50°49′52″N 18°22′38″E
- Country: Poland
- Voivodeship: Opole
- County: Olesno
- Gmina: Olesno

Leśna [ˈlɛɕna] is a village in the administrative district of Gmina Olesno, within Olesno County, Opole Voivodeship, in south-western Poland.
