= Łowoszów =

- Village
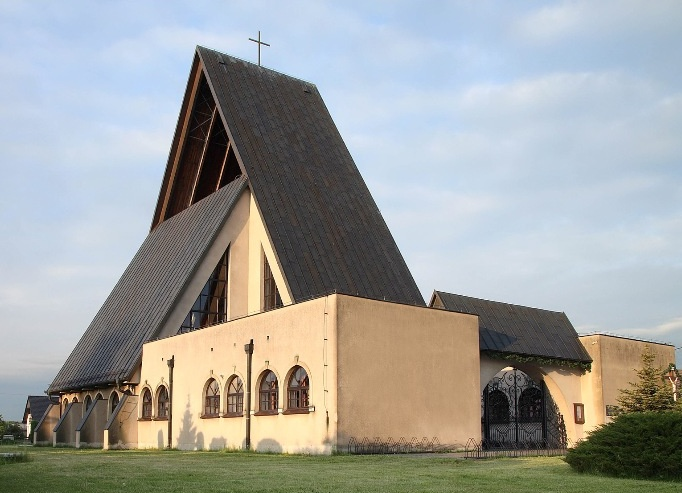
- Church of Our Lady Help of Christians

- Location within Poland
- Coordinates: 50°52′N 18°21′E
- Country: Poland
- Voivodeship: Opole
- County: Olesno
- Gmina: Olesno

Population
  - Total: 545

Łowoszów [wɔˈvɔʂuf] (German: Lowoschau) is a village in the administrative district of Gmina Olesno, within Olesno County, Opole Voivodeship, in south-western Poland.
