= Wojciechów, Olesno County =

Wojciechów
- Village
- Location within Poland
- Coordinates: 50°53′48″N 18°23′30″E
- Country: Poland
- Voivodeship: Opole
- County: Olesno
- Gmina: Olesno

Wojciechów (Polish: [vɔjˈt͡ɕɛxuf]) is a village in the administrative district of Gmina Olesno, within Olesno County, Opole Voivodeship, in south-western Poland.
