= Ostrówki, Lublin Voivodeship =

Ostrówki
- Village
- Location within Poland
- Coordinates: 51°49′23″N 22°48′30″E
- Country: Poland
- Voivodeship: Lublin
- County: Radzyń
- Gmina: Wohyń

Population
  - Total: 780
- Time zone: UTC+1 (CET)
  - Summer (DST): UTC+2 (CEST)

Ostrówki [ɔsˈtrufki] is a village in the administrative district of Gmina Wohyń, within Radzyń County, Lublin Voivodeship, in eastern Poland.

== History ==
12 Polish citizens were murdered by Nazi Germany in the village during World War II.
