= Wachowicz =

Wachowicz is a Polish surname. Notable people with the surname include:

- Marcin Wachowicz (born 1981), Polish footballer
- Włodzimierz Wachowicz (born 1946), Polish handball player
- Zbigniew Wachowicz (born 1972), Polish footballer

== See also ==
- Wachowski
