= Łomnica, Opole Voivodeship =

Łomnica
- Village
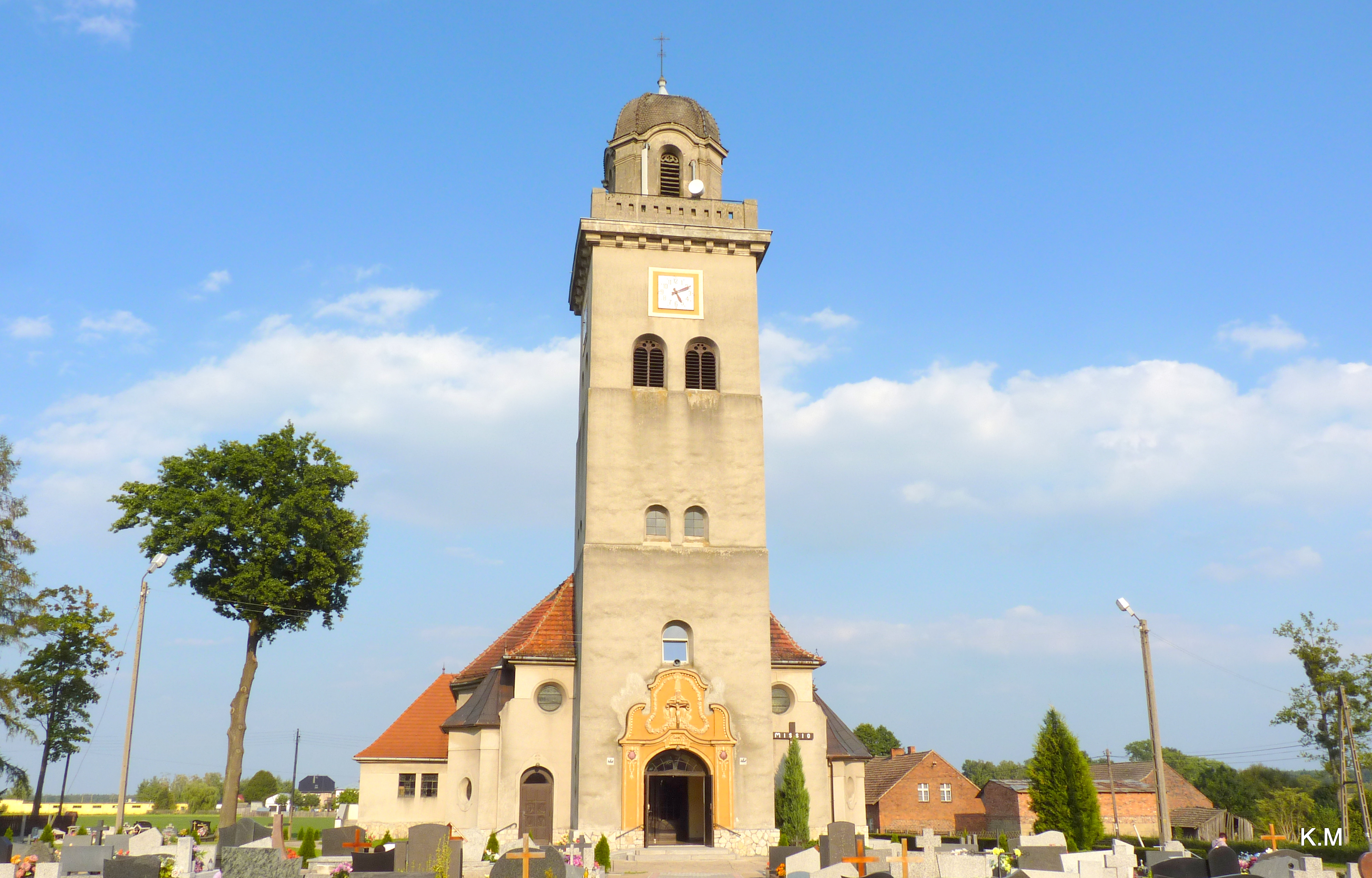
- Church of the Visitation of the Virgin Mary

- Location within Poland
- Coordinates: 50°49′34″N 18°31′43″E
- Country: Poland
- Voivodeship: Opole
- County: Olesno
- Gmina: Olesno
- Time zone: UTC+1 (CET)
  - Summer (DST): UTC+2 (CEST)
- Website: http://lomnica.com.pl/

Łomnica [wɔmˈnit͡sa] is a village in the administrative district of Gmina Olesno, within Olesno County, Opole Voivodeship, in southern Poland. It is approximately 10 km (6 mi) south-east of Olesno and 46 km (29 mi) north-east of the regional capital Opole.

== Etymology ==
The name is of Polish origin, and is derived from the word łom or łomnica, which in turn come from the word łamać, meaning "to break".
