= Gmina Wohyń =

Gmina Wohyń Wohyń Commune
- Gmina
- Coat of arms
- Interactive map of Gmina Wohyń
- Coordinates (Wohyń): 51°45′N 22°47′E
- Country: Poland
- Voivodeship: Lublin
- County: Radzyń
- Seat: Wohyń

Area
  - Total: 178.17 km^{2} (68.79 sq mi)

Population (2006)
  - Total: 7,221
  - Density: 40.53/km^{2} (105.0/sq mi)
- Website: http://www.wohyn.home.pl

Gmina Wohyń is a rural gmina (administrative district) in Radzyń County, Lublin Voivodeship, in eastern Poland. Its seat is the village of Wohyń, which lies 12 kilometres (7 mi) east of Radzyń Podlaski and 58 km (36 mi) north of the regional capital Lublin.

The gmina covers an area of 178.17 square kilometres (68.8 sq mi), and as of 2006 its total population is 7,221.

== Villages ==
Gmina Wohyń contains the villages and settlements of Bezwola, Bojanówka, Branica Suchowolska, Kuraszew, Lisiowólka, Ossowa, Ostrówki, Planta, Suchowola, Świerże, Wohyń, Wólka Zdunkówka and Zbulitów Mały.

== Neighbouring gminas ==
Gmina Wohyń is bordered by the gminas of Czemierniki, Drelów, Komarówka Podlaska, Milanów, Radzyń Podlaski and Siemień.
