= Branica Suchowolska =

- Village
- Location within Poland
- Coordinates: 51°43′N 22°43′E
- Country: Poland
- Voivodeship: Lublin
- County: Radzyń
- Gmina: Wohyń

Branica Suchowolska [braˈnit͡sa suxɔˈvɔlska] is a village in the administrative district of Gmina Wohyń, within Radzyń County, Lublin Voivodeship, in eastern Poland.
