= Suchowola, Radzyń County =

Suchowola
- Village
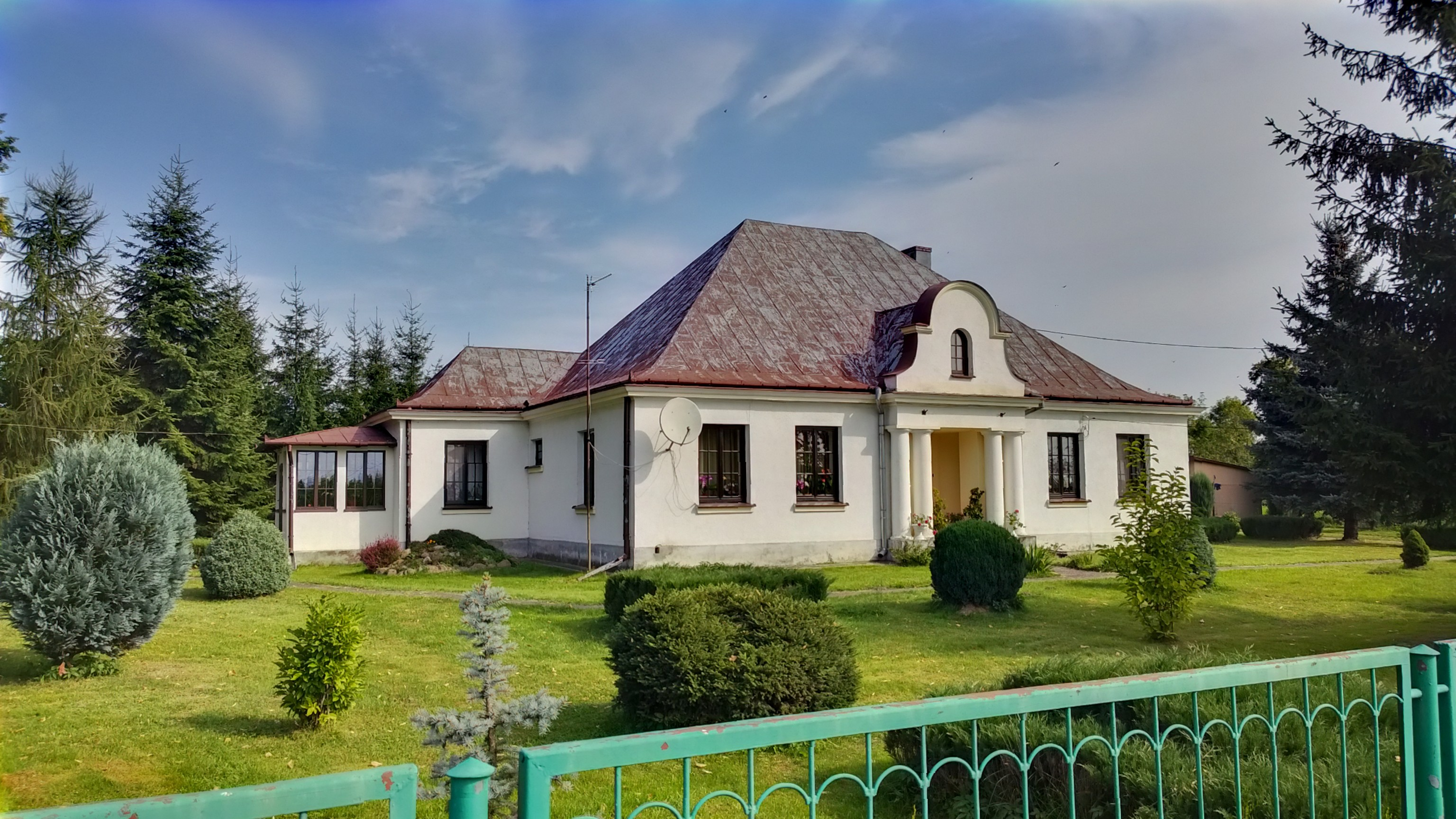
- Old parish house

- Location within Poland
- Coordinates: 51°42′N 22°44′E
- Country: Poland
- Voivodeship: Lublin
- County: Radzyń
- Gmina: Wohyń
- Time zone: UTC+1 (CET)
  - Summer (DST): UTC+2 (CEST)
- Vehicle registration: LRA

Suchowola [suxɔˈvɔla] is a village in the administrative district of Gmina Wohyń, within Radzyń County, Lublin Voivodeship, in eastern Poland.

== History ==
Following the German-Soviet invasion of Poland, which started World War II in September 1939, the village was occupied by Germany until 1944. Six Polish citizens were murdered by Nazi Germany in the village during the war. Afterwards, the village was restored to Poland, although with a Soviet-installed communist regime, which stayed in power until the Fall of Communism in the 1980s. The Polish anti-communist resistance was active in Suchowola, and in 1945 it raided a local communist police station.
