= Sowczyce =

- Village
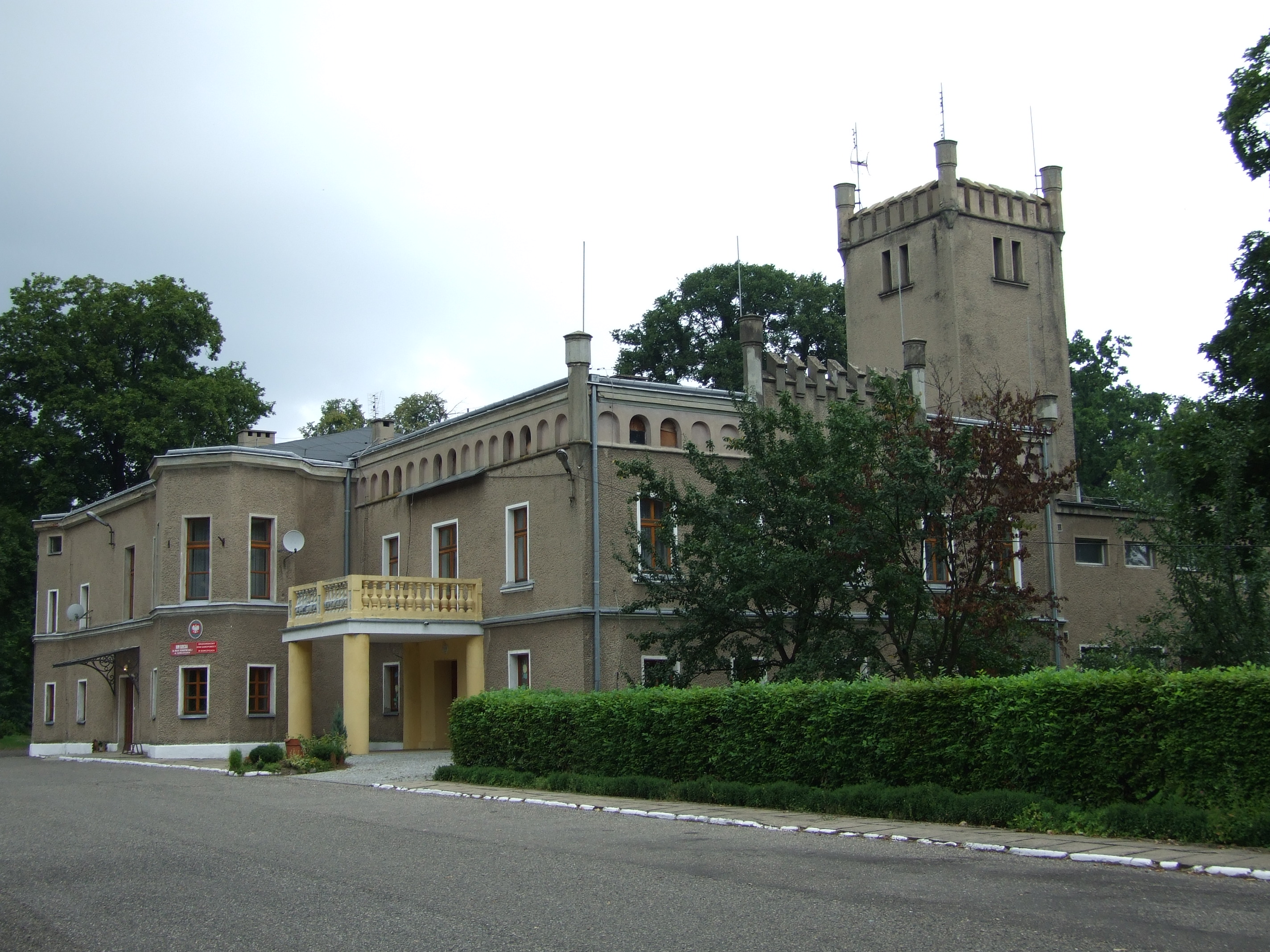
- Palace in Sowczyce, currently serving as an orphanage

- Location within Poland
- Coordinates: 50°50′N 18°29′E
- Country: Poland
- Voivodeship: Opole
- County: Olesno
- Gmina: Olesno
- Time zone: UTC+1 (CET)
  - Summer (DST): UTC+2 (CEST)
- Vehicle registration: OOL

Sowczyce [sɔfˈt͡ʂɨt͡sɛ] (German: Schoffschütz) is a village in the administrative district of Gmina Olesno, within Olesno County, Opole Voivodeship, in southern Poland.

The name of the village is of Polish origin and comes from the word sowa, which means "owl".

== Transport ==
There is a train station in Sowczyce.
