= Wysoka, Olesno County =

Wysoka
- Village
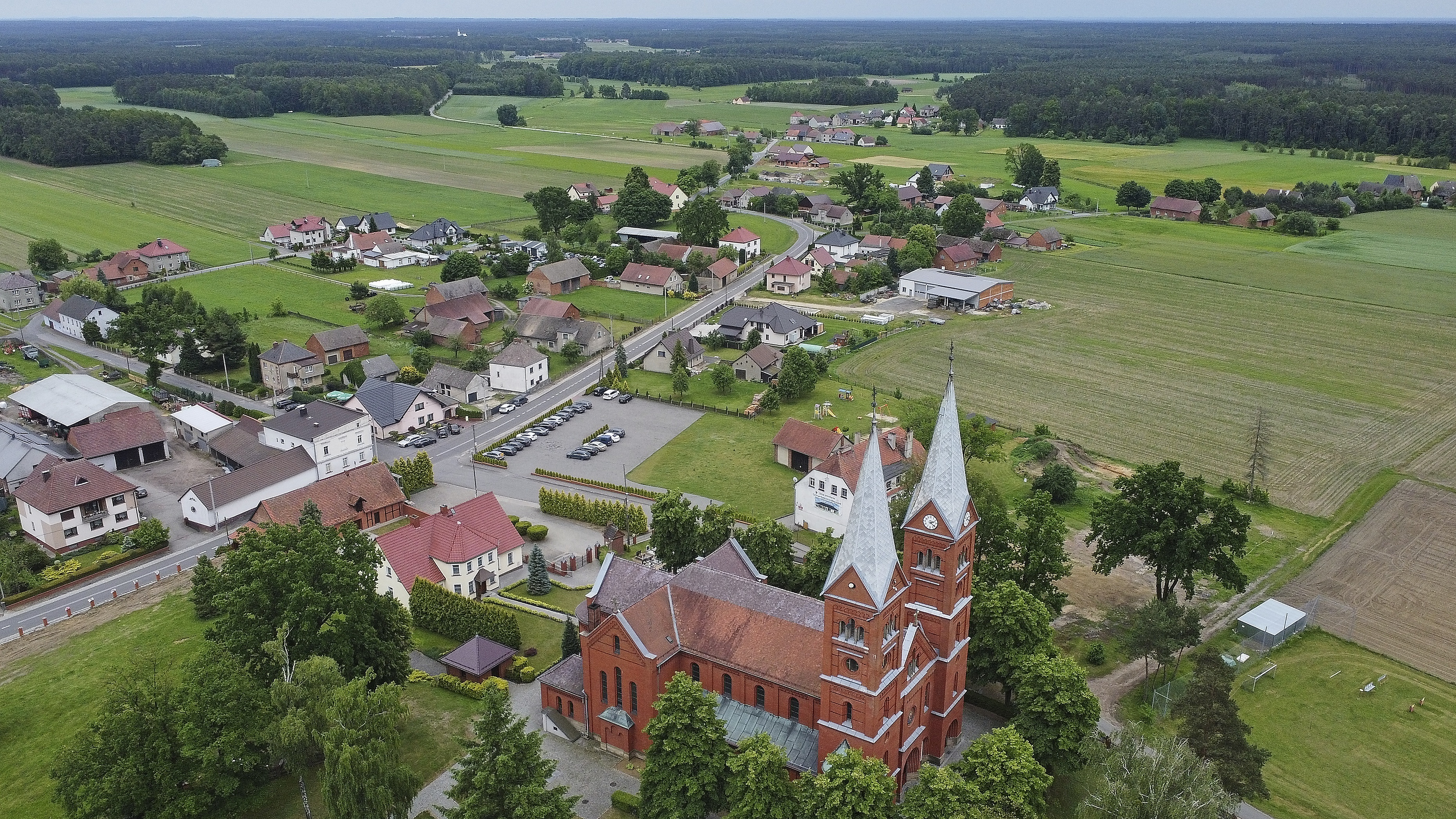
- Skyline with Catholic church

- Location within Poland
- Coordinates: 50°50′N 18°26′E
- Country: Poland
- Voivodeship: Opole
- County: Olesno
- Gmina: Olesno
- Time zone: UTC+1 (CET)
  - Summer (DST): UTC+2 (CEST)
- Vehicle registration: OOL
- Website: http://www.wysoka.olesno.pl

Wysoka [vɨˈsɔka] is a village in the administrative district of Gmina Olesno, within Olesno County, Opole Voivodeship, in southern Poland.

The name of the village is of Polish origin and comes from the word wysoka, which means "high", referring to the elevation of the village.
