= Grodzisko, Olesno County =

Grodzisko
- Village
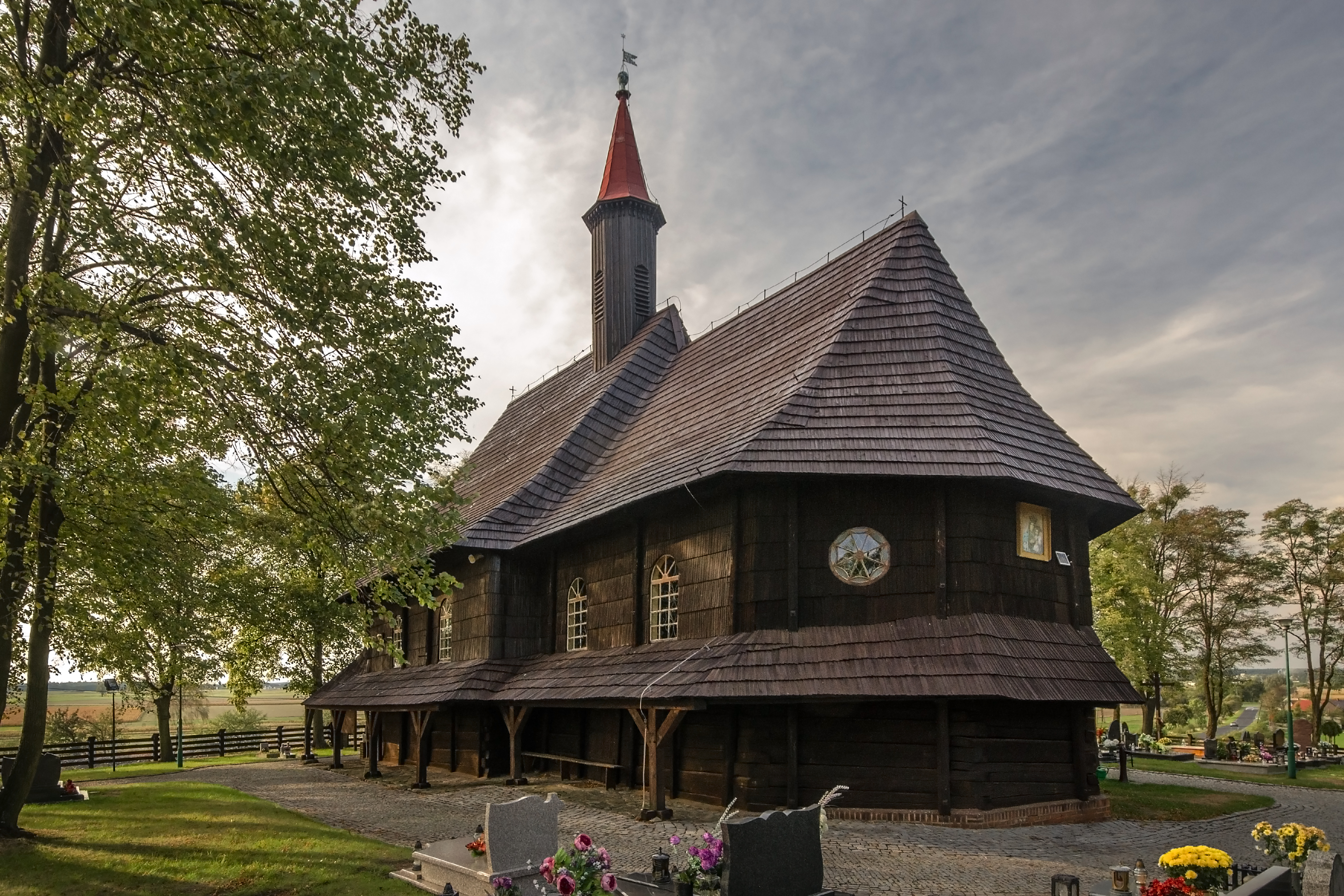
- Saint Roch church in Grodzisko

- Location within Poland
- Coordinates: 50°51′28″N 18°27′02″E
- Country: Poland
- Voivodeship: Opole
- County: Olesno
- Gmina: Olesno
- Time zone: UTC+1 (CET)
  - Summer (DST): UTC+2 (CEST)
- Vehicle registration: OOL

Grodzisko [ɡrɔˈd͡ʑiskɔ] is a village in the administrative district of Gmina Olesno, within Olesno County, Opole Voivodeship, in southern Poland. It is located in Silesia.
