= Gmina Olesno, Opole Voivodeship =

Gmina Olesno Olesno Commune
- Gmina
- Flag Coat of arms
- Interactive map of Gmina Olesno
- Coordinates (Olesno): 50°52′30″N 18°25′0″E
- Country: Poland
- Voivodeship: Opole
- County: Olesno
- Seat: Olesno

Area
  - Total: 240.8 km^{2} (93.0 sq mi)

Population (2019-06-30)
  - Total: 17,726
  - Density: 73.61/km^{2} (190.7/sq mi)
  - Urban: 9,374
  - Rural: 8,352
- Time zone: UTC+1 (CET)
  - Summer (DST): UTC+2 (CEST)
- Vehicle registration: OOL
- Website: http://www.olesno.pl

Gmina Olesno is an urban-rural gmina (administrative district) in Olesno County, Opole Voivodeship, in southern Poland. Its seat is the town of Olesno, which lies approximately 42 kilometres (26 mi) north-east of the regional capital Opole.

The gmina covers an area of 240.8 square kilometres (93.0 sq mi), and as of 2019 its total population is 17,726.

== Villages ==
Apart from the town of Olesno, Gmina Olesno contains the villages and settlements of Bodzanowice, Borki Małe, Borki Wielkie, Boroszów, Broniec, Grodzisko, Kolonia Łomnicka, Kucoby, Leśna, Łomnica, Łowoszów, Sowczyce, Stare Olesno, Świercze, Wachów, Wachowice, Wojciechów and Wysoka.

== Neighbouring gminas ==
Gmina Olesno is bordered by the gminas of Ciasna, Dobrodzień, Gorzów Śląski, Kluczbork, Krzepice, Lasowice Wielkie, Przystajń, Radłów and Zębowice.

== Twin towns – sister cities ==
Gmina Olesno is twinned with:

- Arnsberg, Germany
- Zalakaros, Hungary
- (Czech Republic) Otice, Zbyslavice, Jezdkovice, Czechia
