= Wachów =

- Village
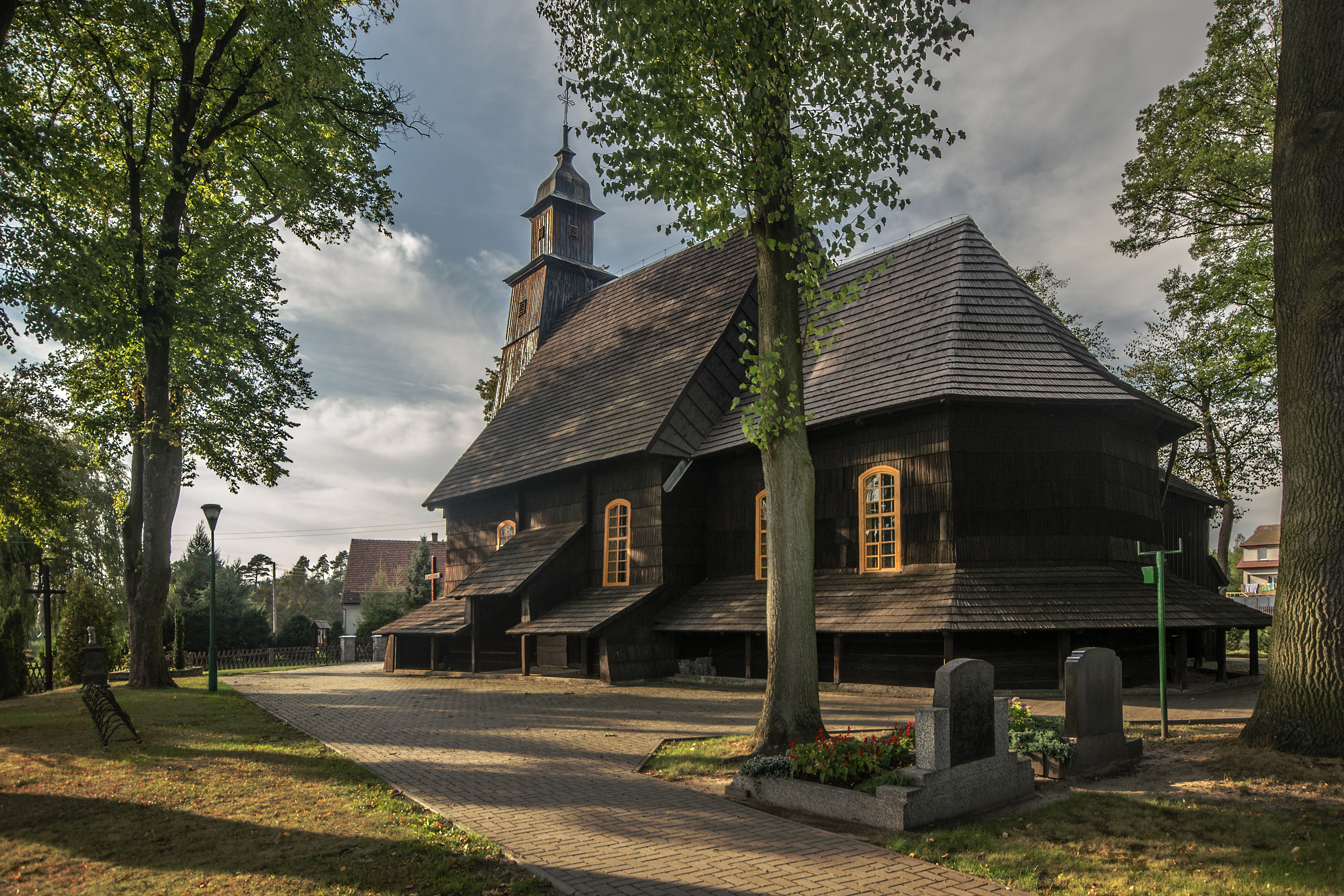
- Catholic church

- Location within Poland
- Coordinates: 50°50′N 18°24′E
- Country: Poland
- Voivodeship: Opole
- County: Olesno
- Gmina: Olesno

Wachów [ˈvaxuf] is a village in the administrative district of Gmina Olesno, within Olesno County, Opole Voivodeship, in south-western Poland.
