= Borki Wielkie, Opole Voivodeship =

Borki Wielkie
- Village
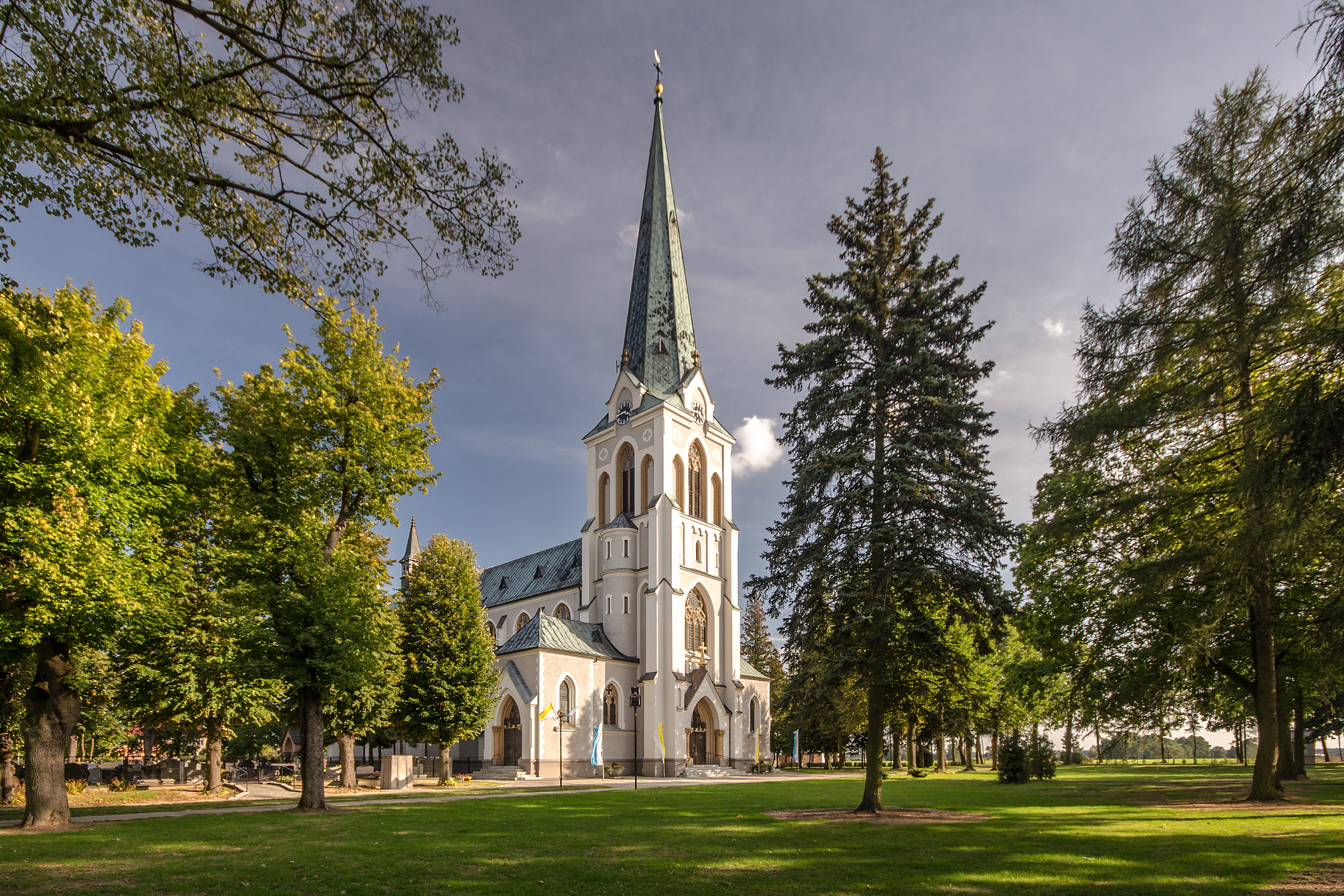
- Catholic church

- Location within Poland
- Coordinates: 50°51′54″N 18°33′27″E
- Country: Poland
- Voivodeship: Opole
- County: Olesno
- Gmina: Olesno
- Population: 1,000
- Website: http://www.borkiwielkie.pl/

Borki Wielkie ([ˈbɔrki ˈvjɛlkʲɛ]; German: Groß Borek) is a village in the administrative district of Gmina Olesno, within Olesno County, Opole Voivodeship, in south-western Poland.
