= Lisiowólka =

- Village
- Location within Poland
- Coordinates: 51°48′12″N 22°45′23″E
- Country: Poland
- Voivodeship: Lublin
- County: Radzyń
- Gmina: Wohyń

Lisiowólka [liɕɔˈvulka] is a village in the administrative district of Gmina Wohyń, within Radzyń County, Lublin Voivodeship, in eastern Poland.
