= Świerże, Radzyń County =

Świerże
- Village
- Location within Poland
- Coordinates: 51°42′N 22°43′E
- Country: Poland
- Voivodeship: Lublin
- County: Radzyń
- Gmina: Wohyń

Świerże (Polish pronunciation: [ˈɕfjɛrʐɛ]) is a village in the administrative district of Gmina Wohyń, within Radzyń County, Lublin Voivodeship, in eastern Poland.
