= Wohyń =

Village in Lubin Voivodeship, Poland

- Village
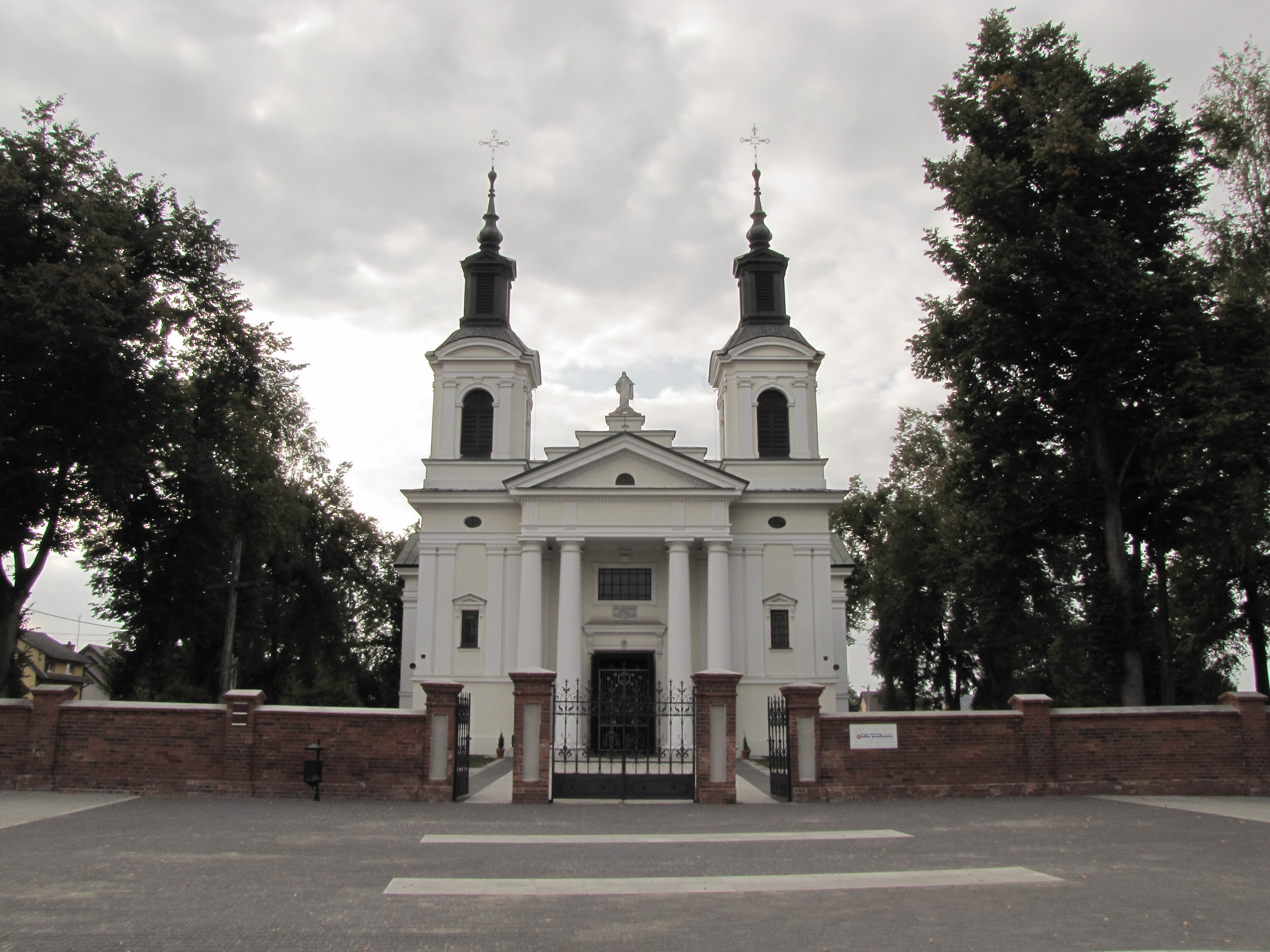
- Church of Saint Anne

- Location within Poland
- Coordinates: 51°45′N 22°47′E
- Country: Poland
- Voivodeship: Lublin
- County: Radzyń
- Gmina: Wohyń

Population
  - Total: 2,000
- Time zone: UTC+1 (CET)
  - Summer (DST): UTC+2 (CEST)
- Vehicle registration: LRA

Wohyń [ˈvɔxɨɲ] is a village in Radzyń County, Lublin Voivodeship, in eastern Poland. It is the seat of the gmina (administrative district) called Gmina Wohyń.

== History ==
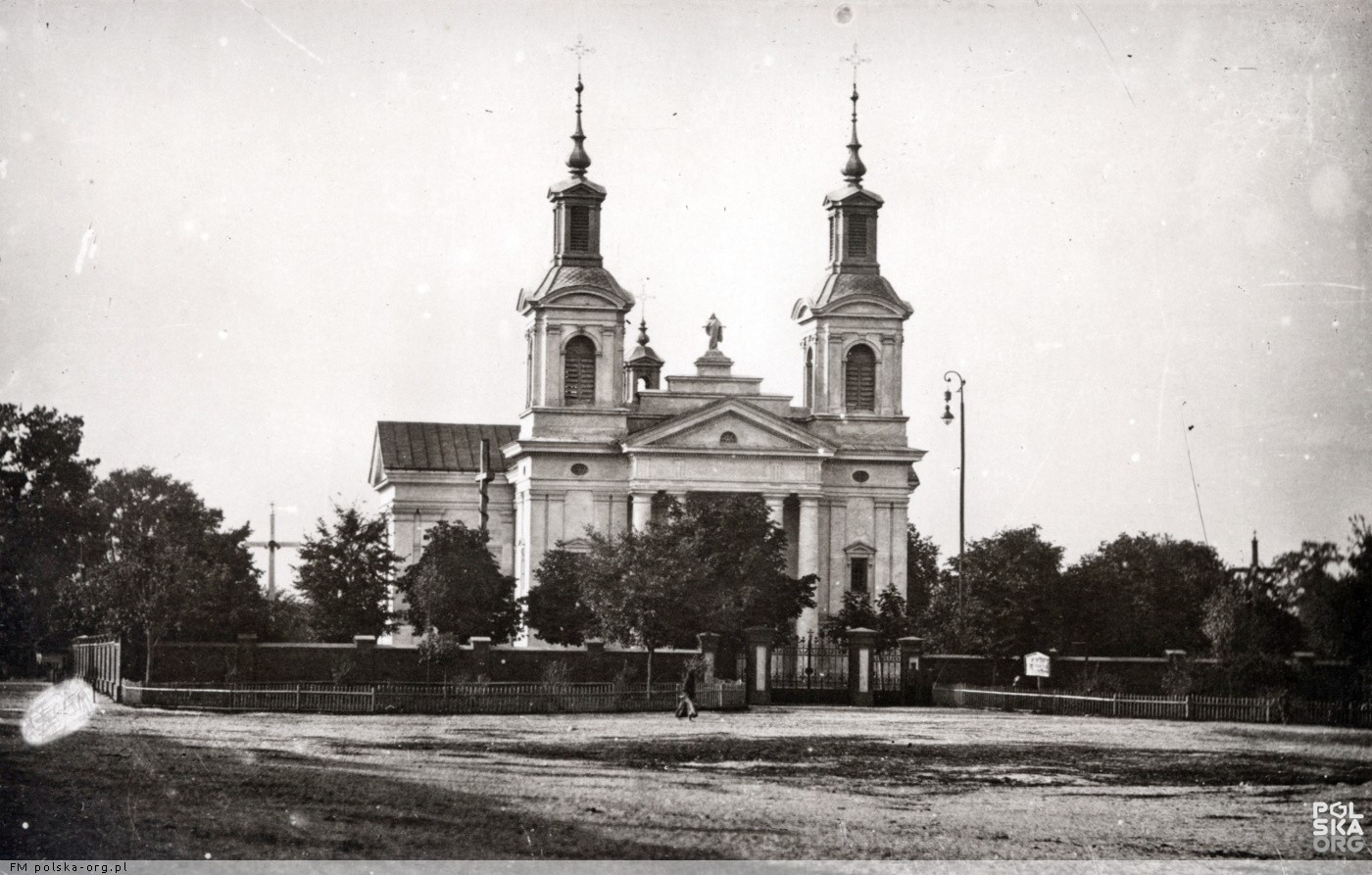
Saint Anne church in 1914

It was granted town rights in 1522. The town was annexed by Austria in the Third Partition of Poland in 1795. After the Polish victory in the Austro-Polish War of 1809, it became part of the short-lived Duchy of Warsaw, and after the duchy's dissolution in 1815, it fell to the Russian Partition of Poland. In 1869, the Tsarist authorities revoked the town rights as punishment for the unsuccessful Polish January Uprising. Following World War I, Poland regained independence and control of Wohyń.

During the German invasion of Poland at the start of World War II, on 9 September 1939, the German Luftwaffe carried out an air raid on Wohyń, killing several residents. Later on, Wohyń was occupied by Nazi Germany until 1944.

== Demographics ==
Historical population

Year	Pop.	±%
1810	1,324	—
1825	1,181	−10.8%
1857	1,861	+57.6%
1868	2,260	+21.4%

Year	Pop.	±%
1890	2,898	+28.2%
1897	2,768	−4.5%
1910	3,877	+40.1%
