= Świercze, Opole Voivodeship =

Świercze
- Village
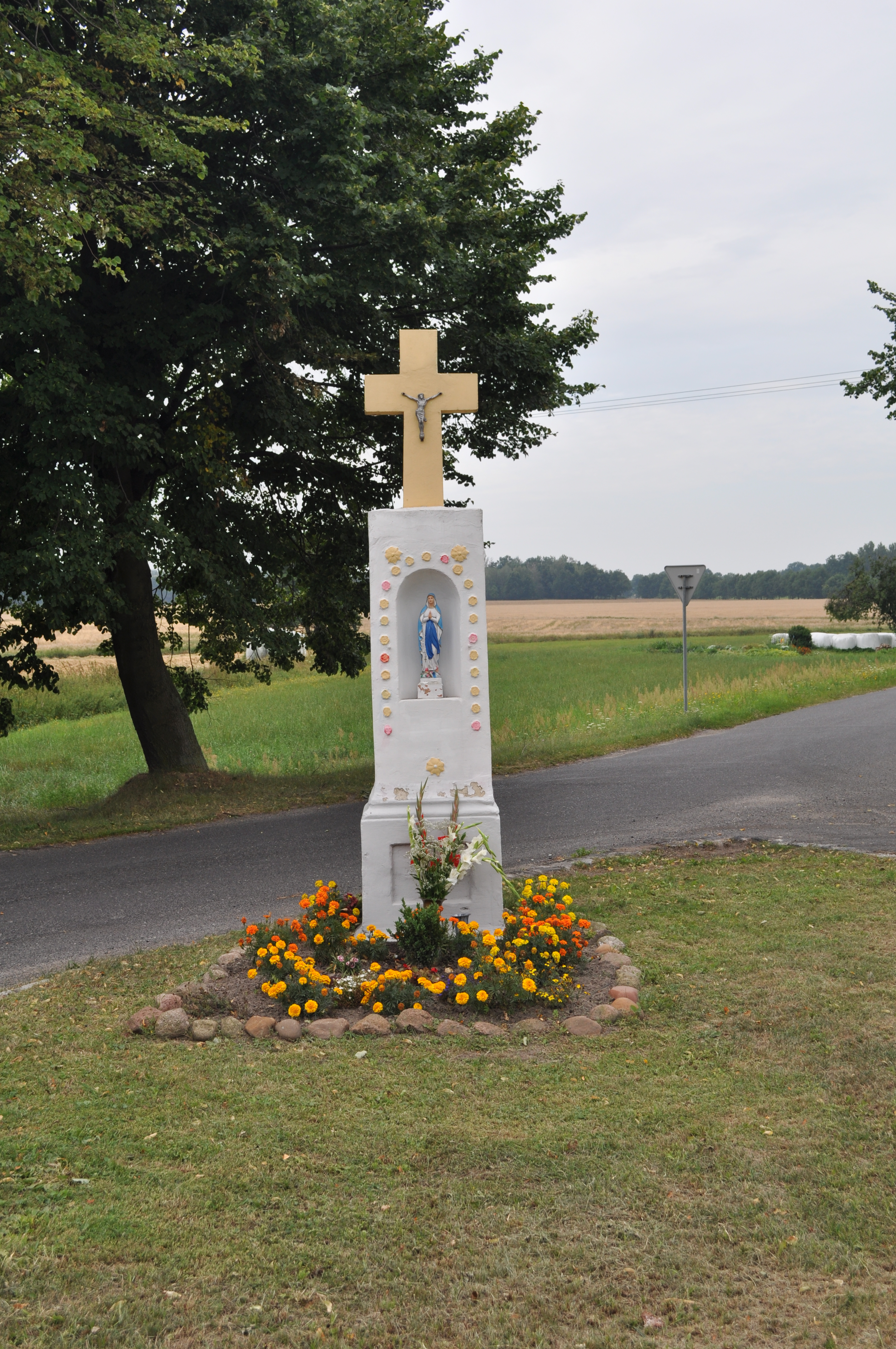
- Shrine in Świercze

- Location within Poland
- Coordinates: 50°52′36″N 18°27′16″E
- Country: Poland
- Voivodeship: Opole
- County: Olesno
- Gmina: Olesno
- Time zone: UTC+1 (CET)
  - Summer (DST): UTC+2 (CEST)

Świercze (Polish: [ˈɕfjɛrt͡ʂɛ]) is a village in the administrative district of Gmina Olesno, within Olesno County, Opole Voivodeship, in southern Poland.
