= Bezwola =

- Village
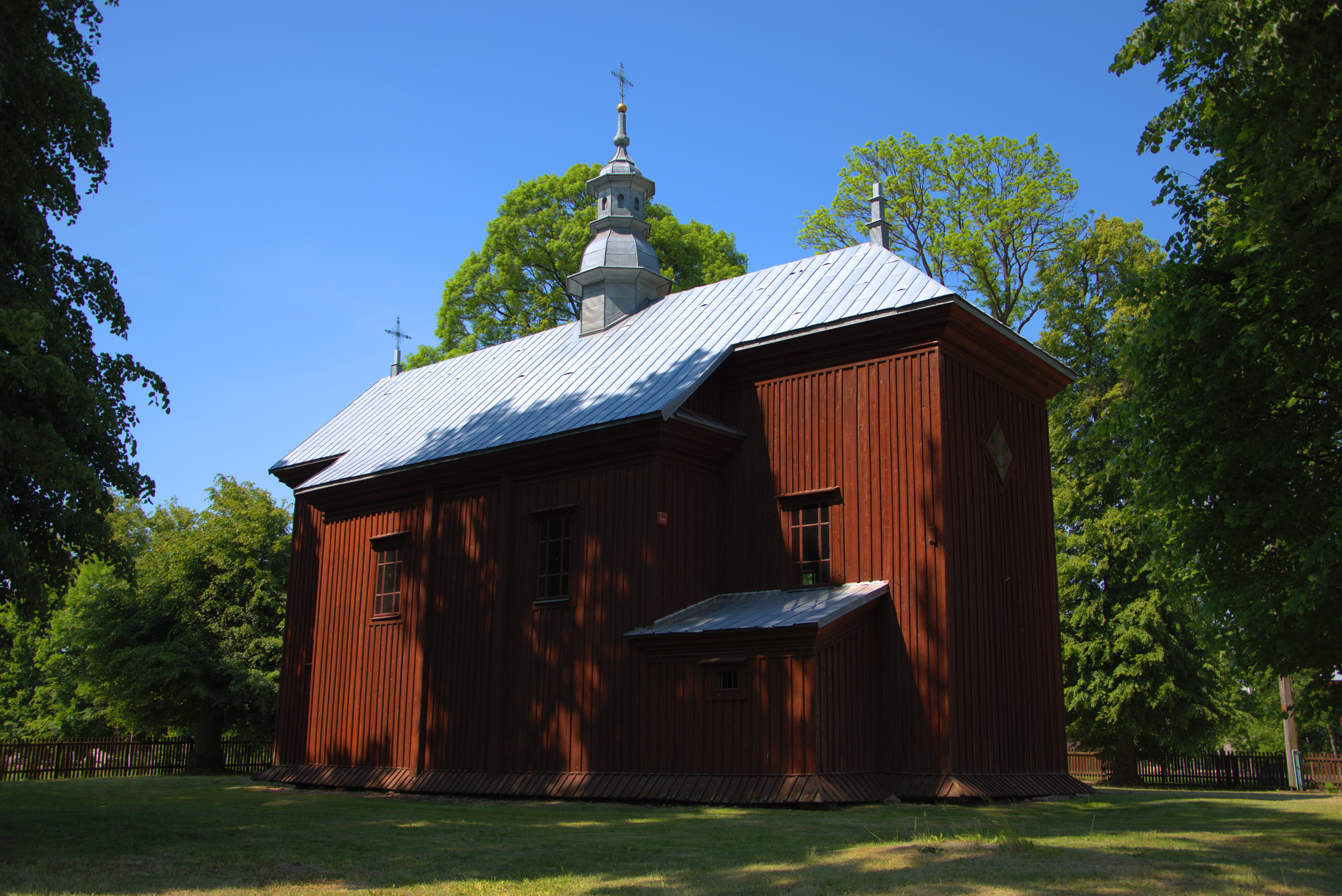
- Church of the Resurrection of Christ in Bezwola

- Location within Poland
- Coordinates: 51°46′N 22°48′E
- Country: Poland
- Voivodeship: Lublin
- County: Radzyń
- Gmina: Wohyń

Population
  - Total: 1,600
- Time zone: UTC+1 (CET)
  - Summer (DST): UTC+2 (CEST)
- Vehicle registration: LRA

Bezwola [bɛzˈvɔla] is a village in the administrative district of Gmina Wohyń, within Radzyń County, Lublin Voivodeship, in eastern Poland.
