= Jakub Kubicki =

Polish classicist architect and designer

- Born: 1758; Warsaw
- Died: 13 June 1833 (aged 74–75); Wilków Pierwszy
- Occupation: Architect
- Buildings: Belweder Palace; Kubicki Arcades; The Egyptian Temple in Warsaw

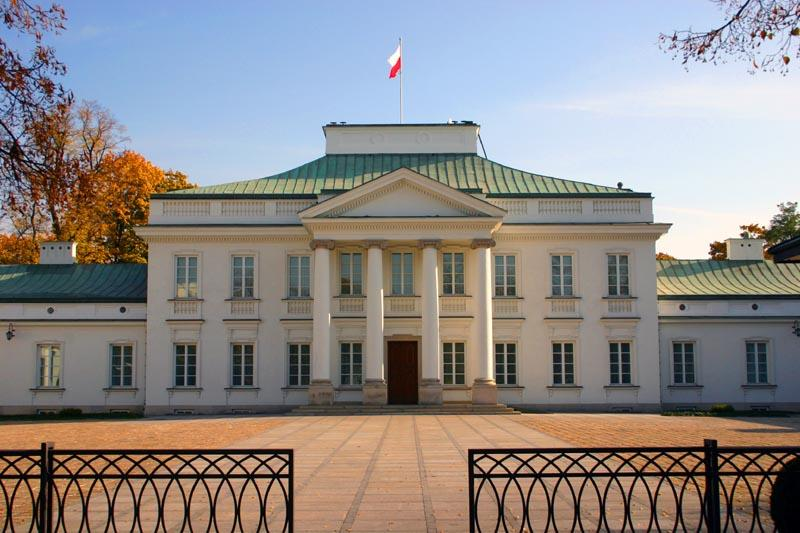
The Belvedere Palace in Warsaw, which was reconstructed by Kubicki

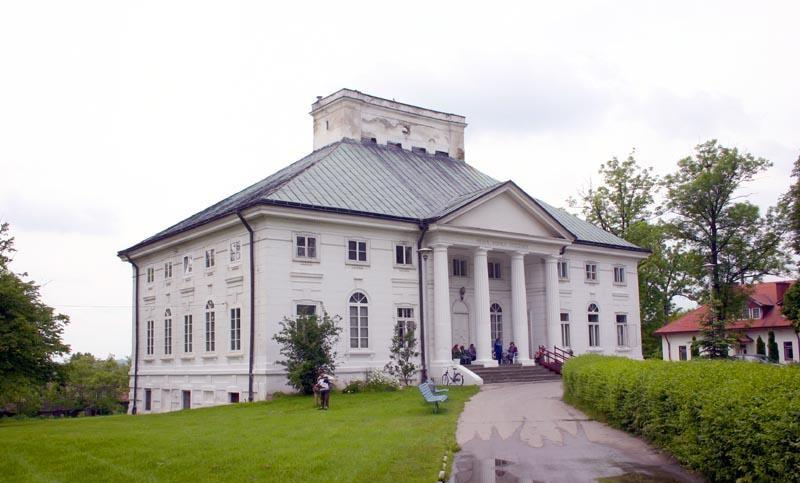
The Badenich Palace in Bejsce

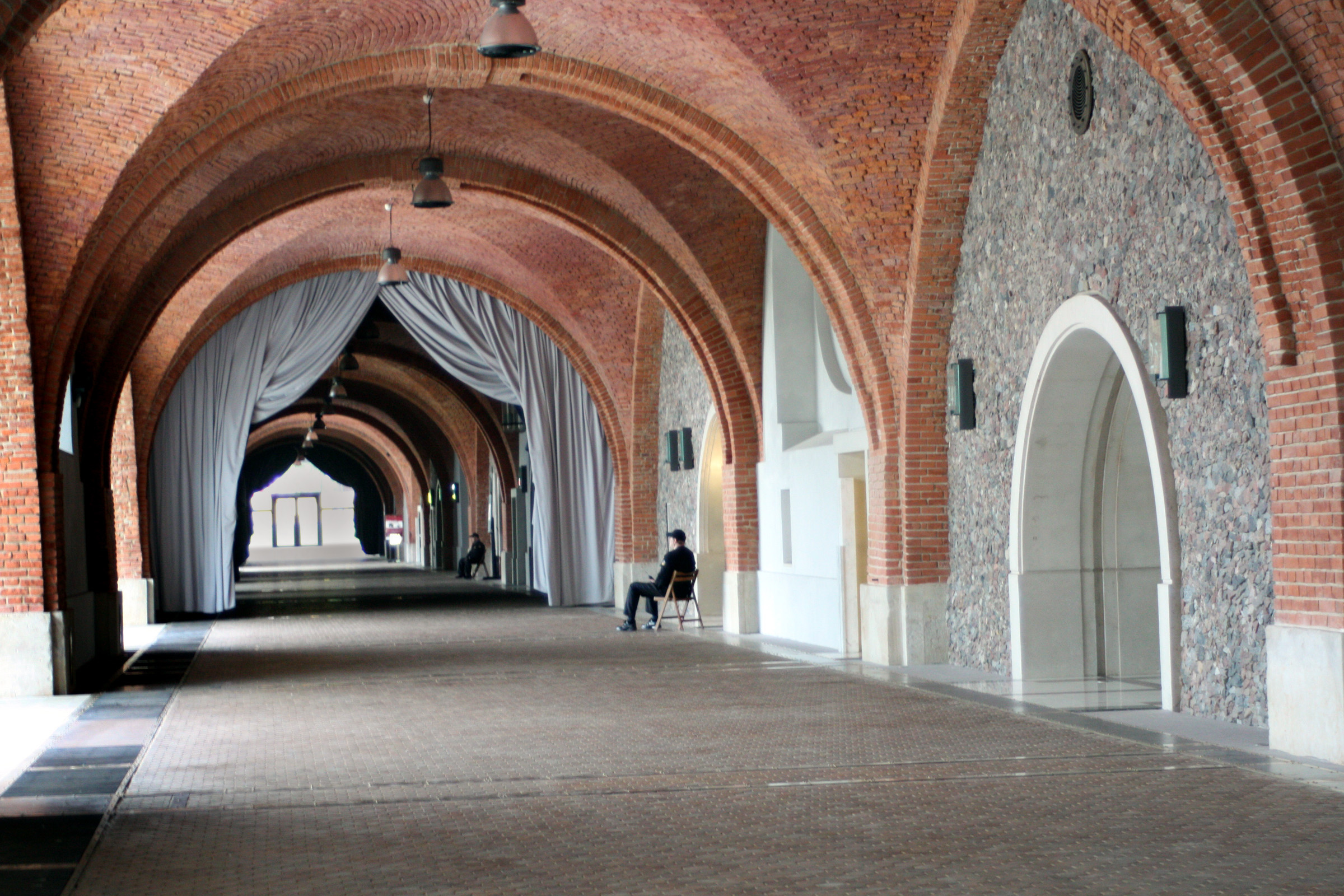
The Kubicki Arcades at the Royal Castle in Warsaw

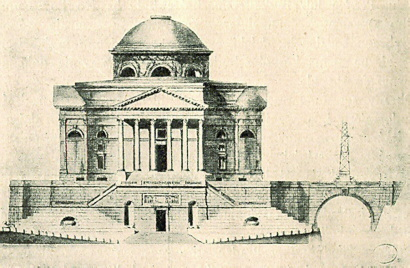
Design for the Temple of Divine Providence in Warsaw (1792)

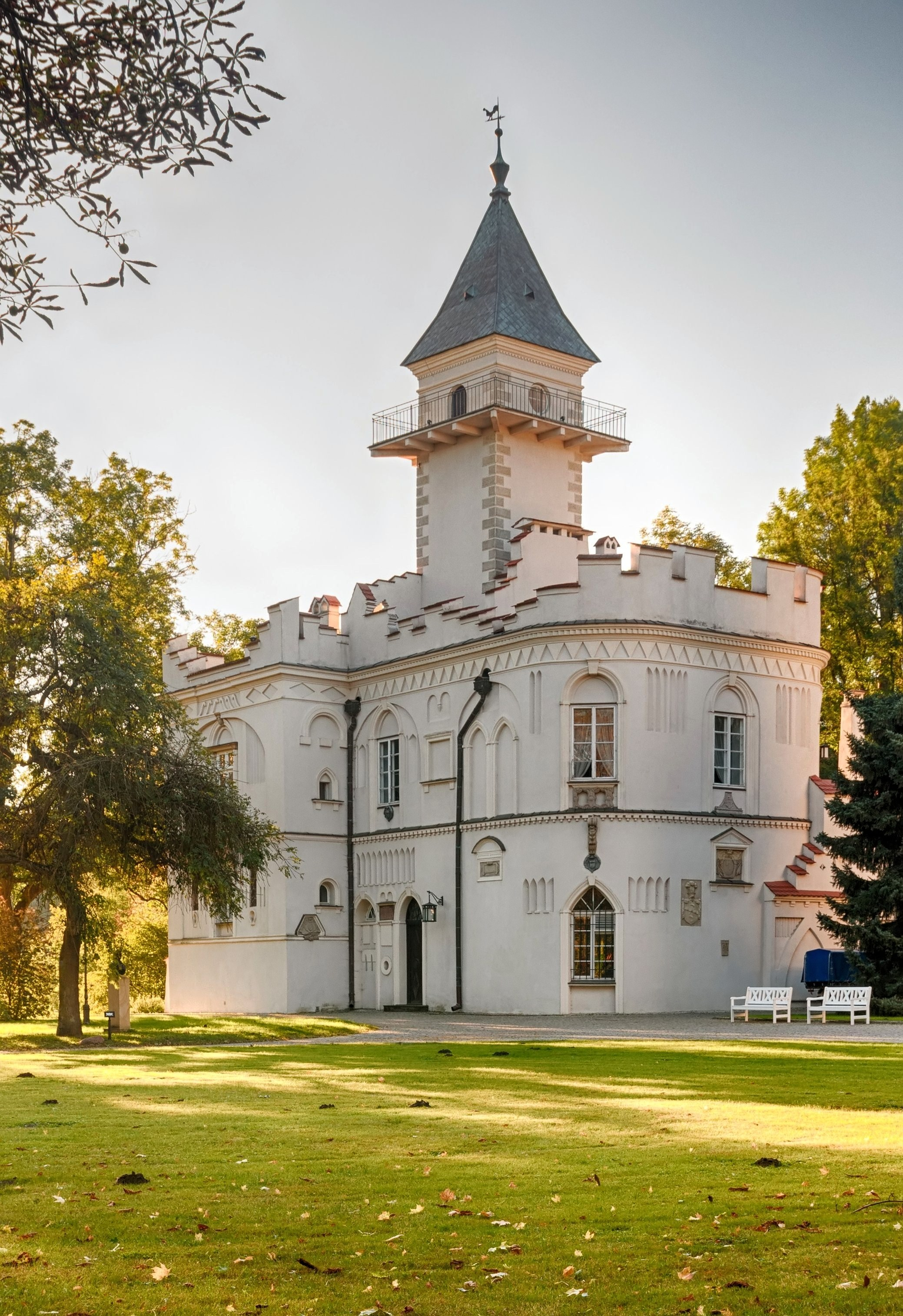
The castle in Radziejowice

Jakub Kubicki (1758–1833) was a Polish classicist architect and designer.

== Biography ==
Born in Warsaw in 1758, into a bourgeois family, Jakub Kubicki graduated from the Jesuit College, at the same time that he was taking lessons from Domenico Merlini. In 1777, he was hired by architect Szymon Bogumił Zug to help in the construction of the Holy Trinity Church in Warsaw.

In 1783, he went to study in Italy as a fellow of King Stanisław August Poniatowski (with his brother), from where he returned in 1786. On his return he worked as an architect and he was the personal architect to the king.

Around 1783, he got married and had three children: Helena (b. 1784), Józefa (1787–1812), and Izabela (born 1791).

In 1791, in recognition of his services, he was knighted and received the coat of arms of Kolumna Skrzydlata (lit. 'Winged Column'). Since the possession of an estate was a symbol of belonging to the nobility, for many years he had an estate in Wilków. At the time of the Kościuszko Uprising, he was a judge in the Criminal Court of the Duchy of Mazovia.

After the collapse of the Polish Kingdom, he was an official with the position of the Crown Chief at the Intendant Building. Jakub Kubicki also belonged to the Temple of Isis masonic lodge, of which he was an honorary member from 1811 to 1812. He was a member of the Dawn Rising masonic lodge in 1818.

He died on 13 June 1833, in Wilków.

He was awarded the Order of Saint Stanislaus 2nd class, with a grant from Emperor Alexander I of Russia.

== Architectural work ==
He was the designer of numerous palaces. As an architect in Warsaw after 1807, he became a mediator between the pure classicism of the 18th century and the Empire style. Kubicki's works are characterized by use of typical design elements such as portico columns. He represented the mature phase of neo-classicism with Palladian influences and he was the designer of the typical Polish manor-palace.

In addition to projects such as palaces in Bejsce, Białaczów, Młochów, Nadzów, Pławowice, Radziejowice, Ropczyce, Sowiniec, Sterdyń he was the designer of many buildings inside and outside Warsaw. He designed churches in Mokobody and Radziejowice, as well as the town hall in Łęczyca and Weapons Factory in Kozienice.

== Major works ==
- A palace for Marcin Badeni in Bejsce (1802)
- The palace in Pławowice (1804–1805)
- Reconstruction of the Krzemieniec Lyceum (1805)
- Church of St Klemens in Nadarzyn (1806)
- Warsaw toll houses from 1816 to 1818 at: Mokotów, Grochów, Marymonckie, Wolska, Jerozolimski, Golędzinowski, Powązkowski and Belweder
- Church of the Holy Trinity in Podwale in Warsaw (from 1818)
- Castle Square in Warsaw (1818–1821)
- The Kubicki Arcades at the Royal Castle in Warsaw (1819–21)
- An unrealised design for the Temple of Divine Providence in Warsaw
- The church of St. Jadwiga in Mokobody (a smaller version of his unrealised Temple of Divine Providence design)
- The Egyptian Gate at the castle in Ternopil
- Palace in Białaczów (around 1797)
- Reconstruction of the Radziejowice Castle in palace and park of Radziejowice
- Płock Town Hall (1827)
- The Płock toll houses (1816-1818, 1825): Warsaw, Dobrzynski and Płońsk.
- The palace in Ładyhy
- The palace in Samczyki – designing and decorating the ceiling in a circular living room
- The triumphal arch in Three Crosses Square in Warsaw (1809, 1815)

=== Buildings in Warsaw's Łazienki Park ===
- The Belweder Palace (the reconstruction in 1818–22)
- The Temple of Sybill (Świątynia Sybilli) (around 1820)
- The Hall within Belweder (1823–24)
- The Kubicki Stables (Stajnia Kubickiego) (1825–1826)
- The New Guardhouse (Nowa Kordegarda) (1830).

=== Objects of uncertain design ===
- The Egyptian Temples (Świątynia Egipska) in Łazienki Park (1819–1822)
- The House of the Invalids (Barracks Cantonists - Koszary Kantonistów) in Łazienki Park (1826–29)
- The palace complex in Farmstead Sielce (Folwark Sielce) - formerly part of the Łazienki Park (about 1820 or earlier)

== Bibliography ==
- Andrzej Wąsowski, Kubicki w Wilkowie, Spotkania z Zabytkami, 11/2002
- Wioletta Brzezińska-Marjanowska Klasycystyczna architektura pałacowa na Wołyniu ok. 1780-1831 r.
