= Samchyky Palace and Park Ensemble =

- Палацово-парковий ансамбль «Самчики»
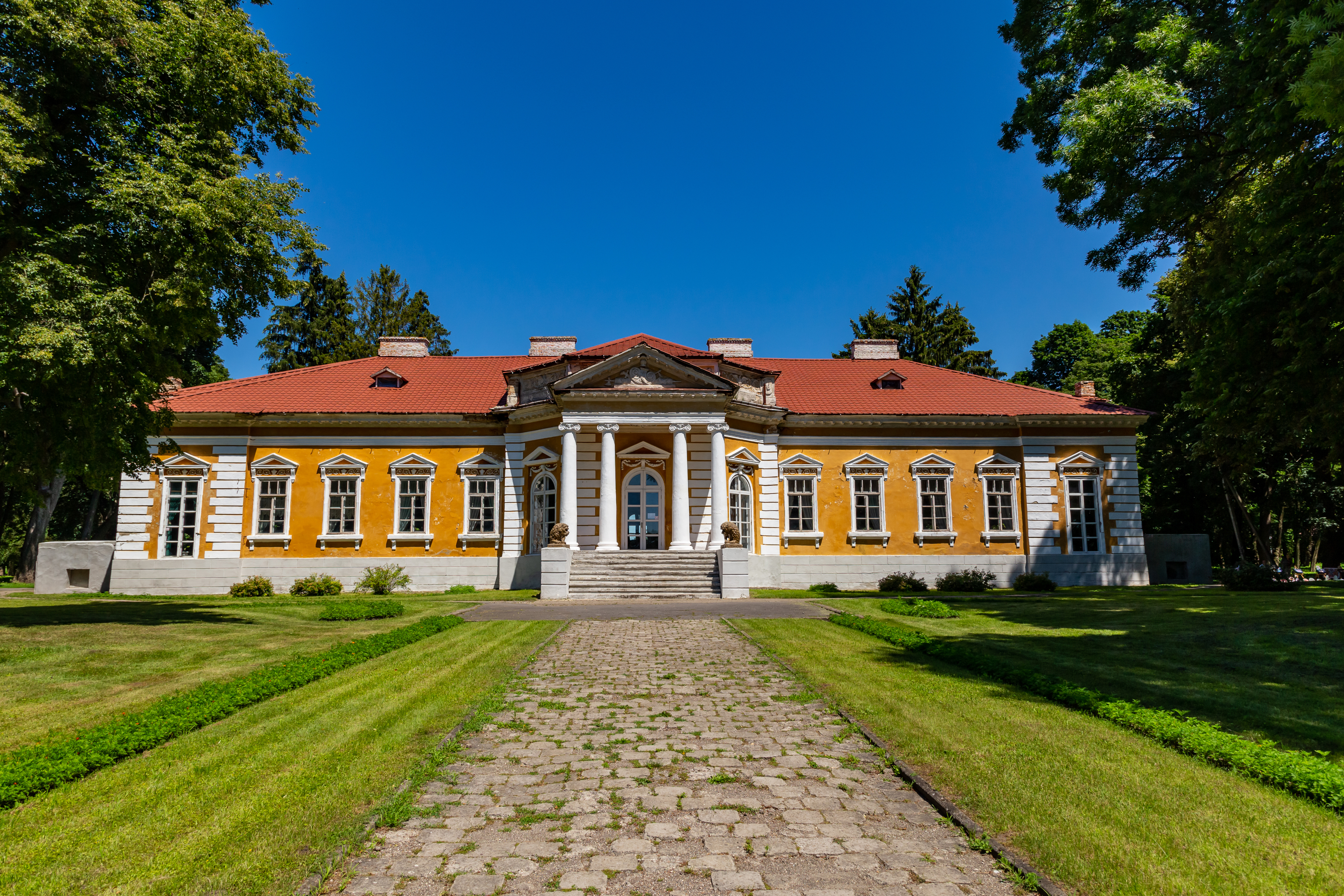
- Chechels' Palace
- Interactive map of the Samchyky Palace and Park Ensemble area

General information
- Type: National Historical-Cultural Reserve
- Location: Khmelnytskyi Oblast, Samchyky, Ukraine
- Coordinates: 49°45′59″N 27°23′50″E
- Year built: 18th–19th centuries

Design and construction
- Architects: Jakub Kubicki (Chechels' Palace), Denis McClair (park)

Immovable Monument of National Significance of Ukraine
- Official name: Садиба (Manor)
- Type: Architecture
- Reference no.: 220047

The Samchyky Palace and Park Ensemble (Ukrainian: Палацово-парковий ансамбль «Самчики», romanized: Palatsovo-parkovyi ansambl "Samchyky"), also called the Samchyky Estate, is a historic complex in Samchyky near Starokostiantyniv, Khmelnytskyi Oblast. The ensemble is composed of two palaces, a park, a Chinese house, a fountain, and other buildings and structures. Nowadays the complex is a museum and a national historic reserve.

== History ==
=== Poland ===
The first manor in Samchyky was established by Jan Chojecki in the beginning of 18th century. The old palace was built in 1725 and was preserved to this day. The unappealing design of the old palace prompted new owners to use the building for service purposes.

The next owner of the estate was Petro Chechel, the starosta of Haisyn. During his tenure, the estate developed greatly with the construction of a new palace (designed by Jakub Kubicki), two outbuildings, a gate, greenhouses, stables, and a surrounding wall. The park was reorganized into an English landscape garden. In 1822, Petro gifted the estate to his son Yan. The estate was inherited by his wife Liudvika in 1843, and later by their son Yakub. Yakub Chechel established a music school here in 1854.

=== Russian Empire ===
Yakub was captured, tortured, and killed by the Russian army, and the estate was confiscated by the Tsar. In January 1867, the land was sold to Kupriian Liashkov, a businessman from Zhytomyr. In 1870, Ivan Ugrimov became the owner of the Samchyky estate, where he built a school and a library. In 1902, the estate was sold to Mykhailo Shestakov, who owned the territory until 1916.

=== Soviet Union ===
During the Soviet period, both the interior and the exterior of the palace was damaged, and many buildings on the territory of the estate were destroyed. The sculpture of the fountain burned down. In different periods, the new palace was used as a living space, a club, a library, a paramedic centre, and a pioneer camp. The greenhouse, stables, and carriage houses were dismantled, and the materials were used for construction of other buildings. After WWII, the palace functioned as the building of the collective farm. In 1956, the Khmelnytskyi State Experimental Agriculture Station replaced the collective farm. The walls of the palace were damaged by chemicals from the experiments. In 1958, the complex of outbuildings of the old palace was destroyed. In 1960, Samchyky park was recognized as a monument of garden art. In 1971, a gazebo in the park was ruined. In 1979, the entire palace and park ensemble became a monument of historic-cultural heritage of Ukraine. On 15 August 1990, a museum was created on the territory.

=== Independent Ukraine ===
Since 5 August 1997, Samchyky Palace and Park Ensemble is a national historic reserve.

== Landmarks ==
- The Chechels' Palace (The New Palace) is the main building of the ensemble. There are five main rooms in the palace: the Round Room, the Great Room, the Roman Room, the Resting Room, and the Japanese Room. The Japanese Room includes the only surviving European orientalist frescoes in Ukraine. Since 19th century the palace has the nickname "Ukrainian Versailles".
- The Chojecki's Palace (The Old Palace) is the oldest building of the ensemble.
- Samchyky Park comprises multiple areas, as it was expanded and modified many times in its history. The park covers an area of 18.8 ha.
- The Chinese House is almost entirely built in a Classicist style, except for the roof, which imitates the roof of a Chinese pagoda.
- Sculptures, pavilions, gates, walls, and other structures

== Gallery ==
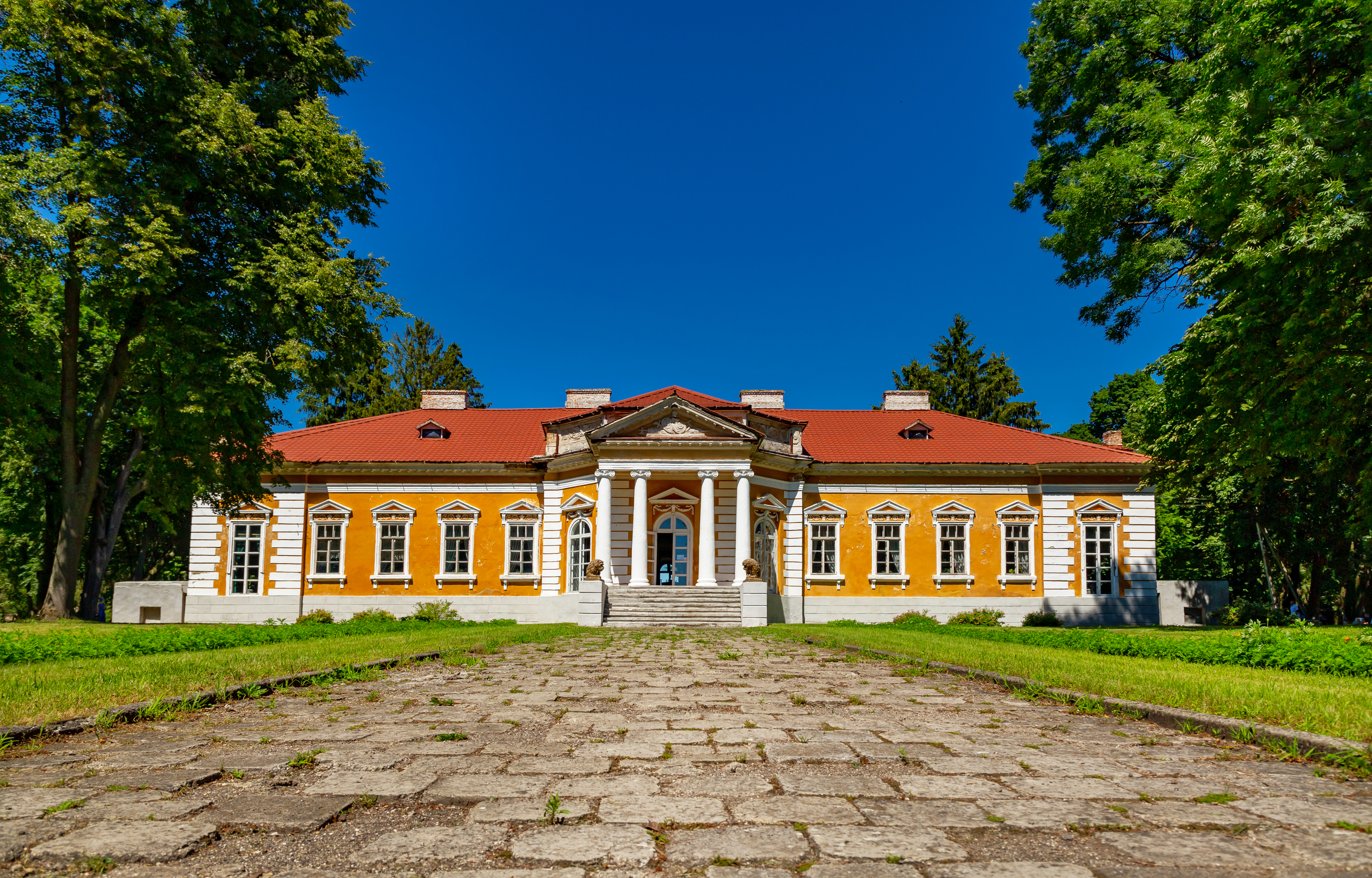
The Chechels' Palace (The New Palace) exterior

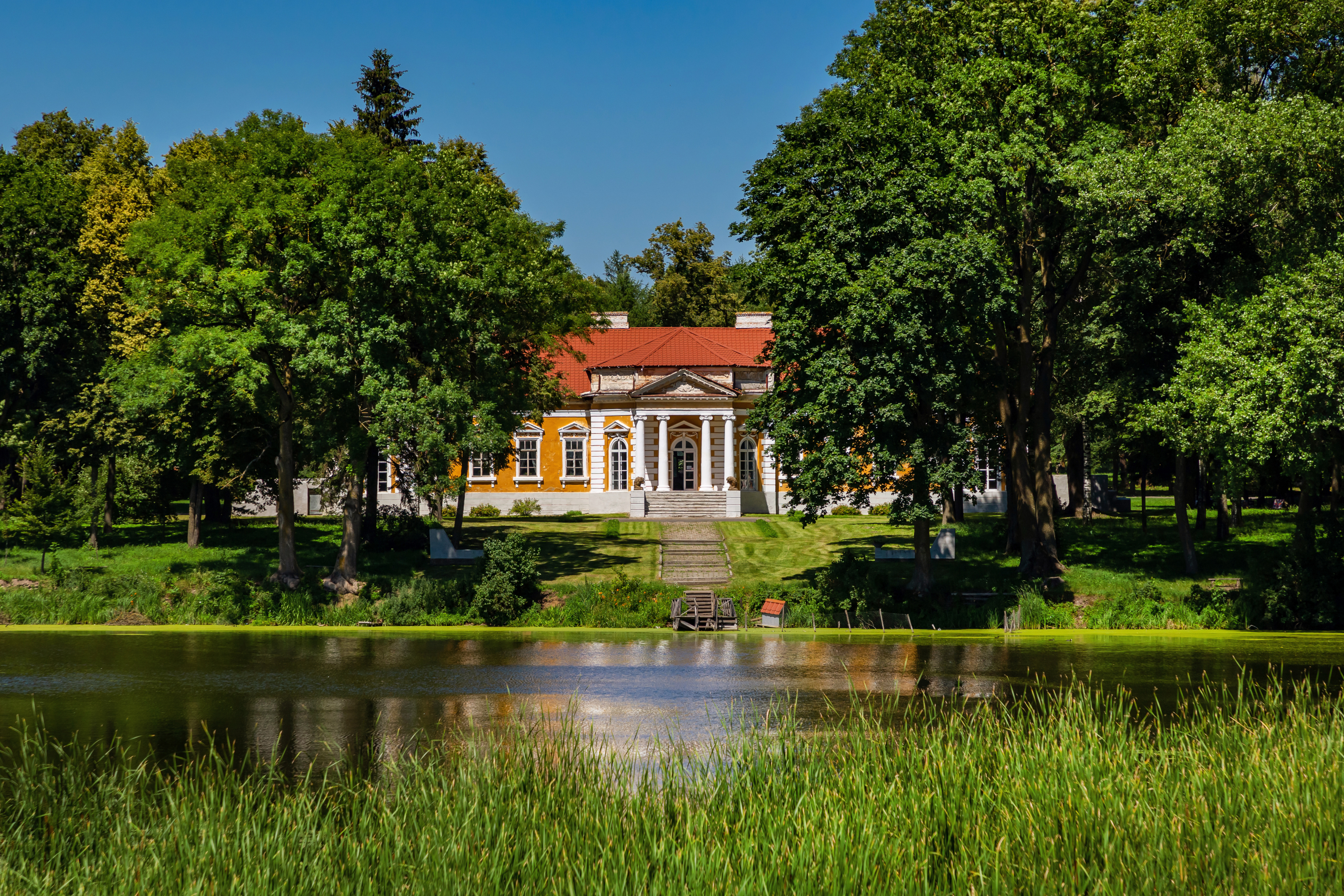
View from the river

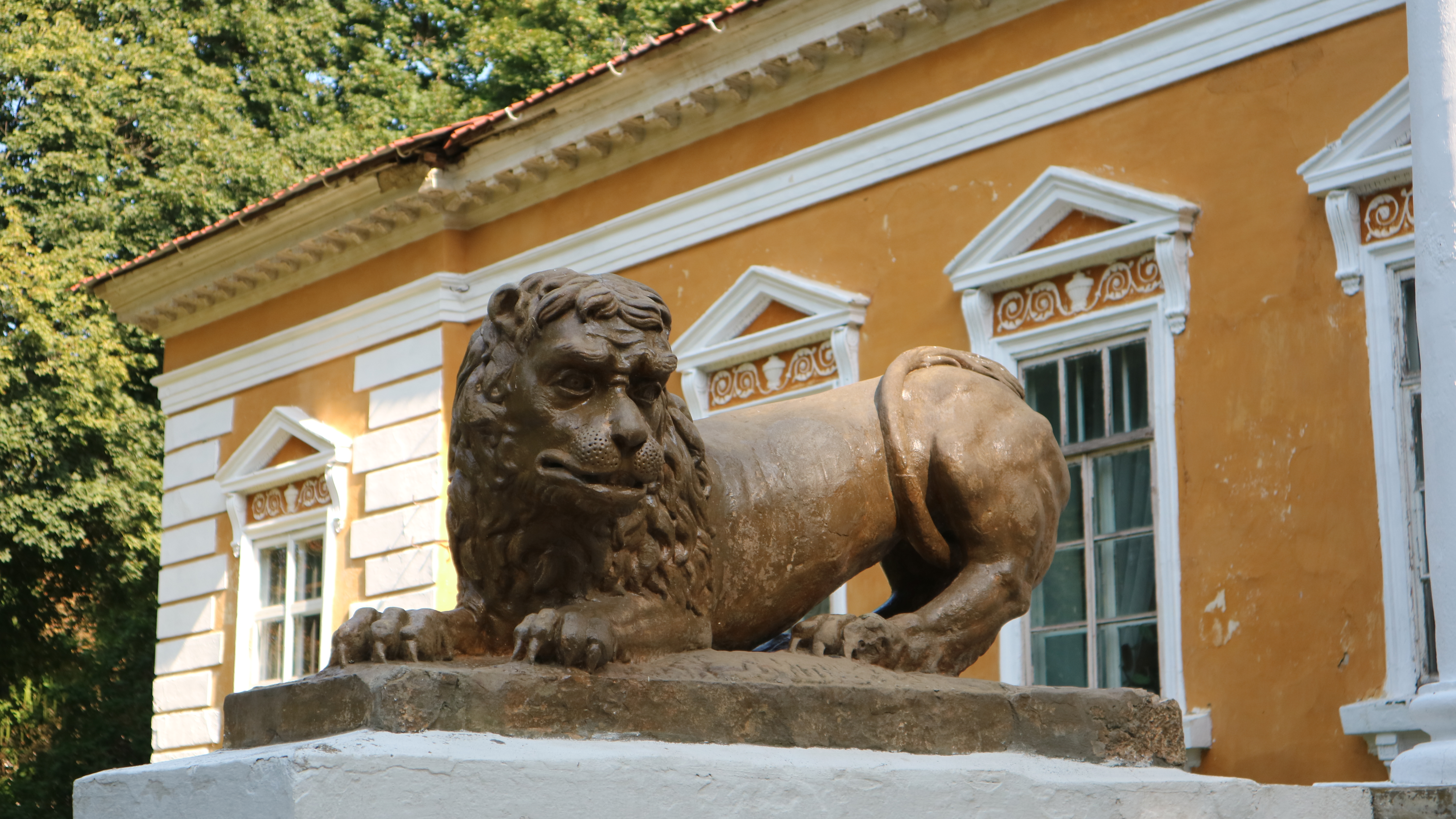
Lion statue

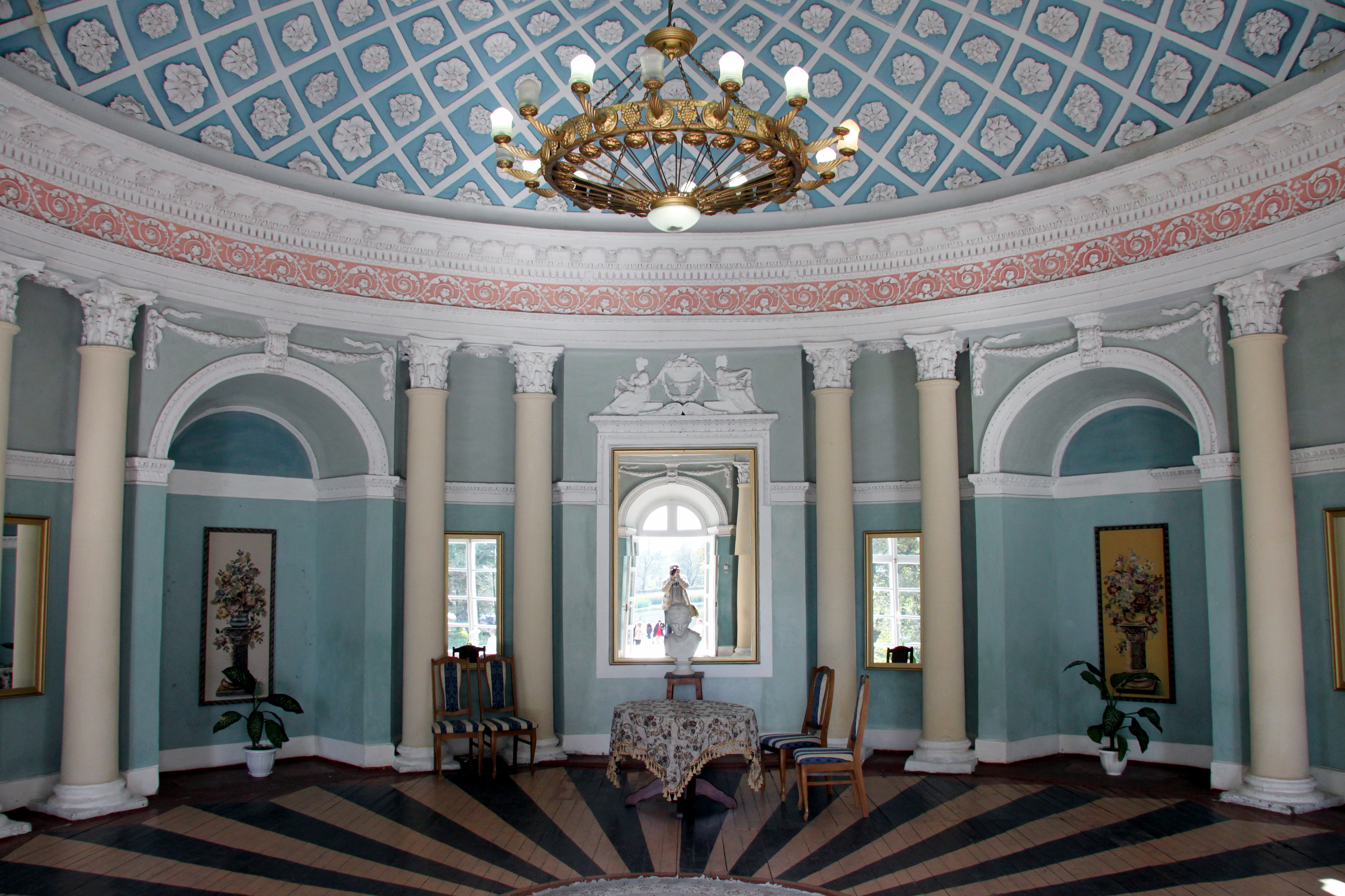
The Round Room

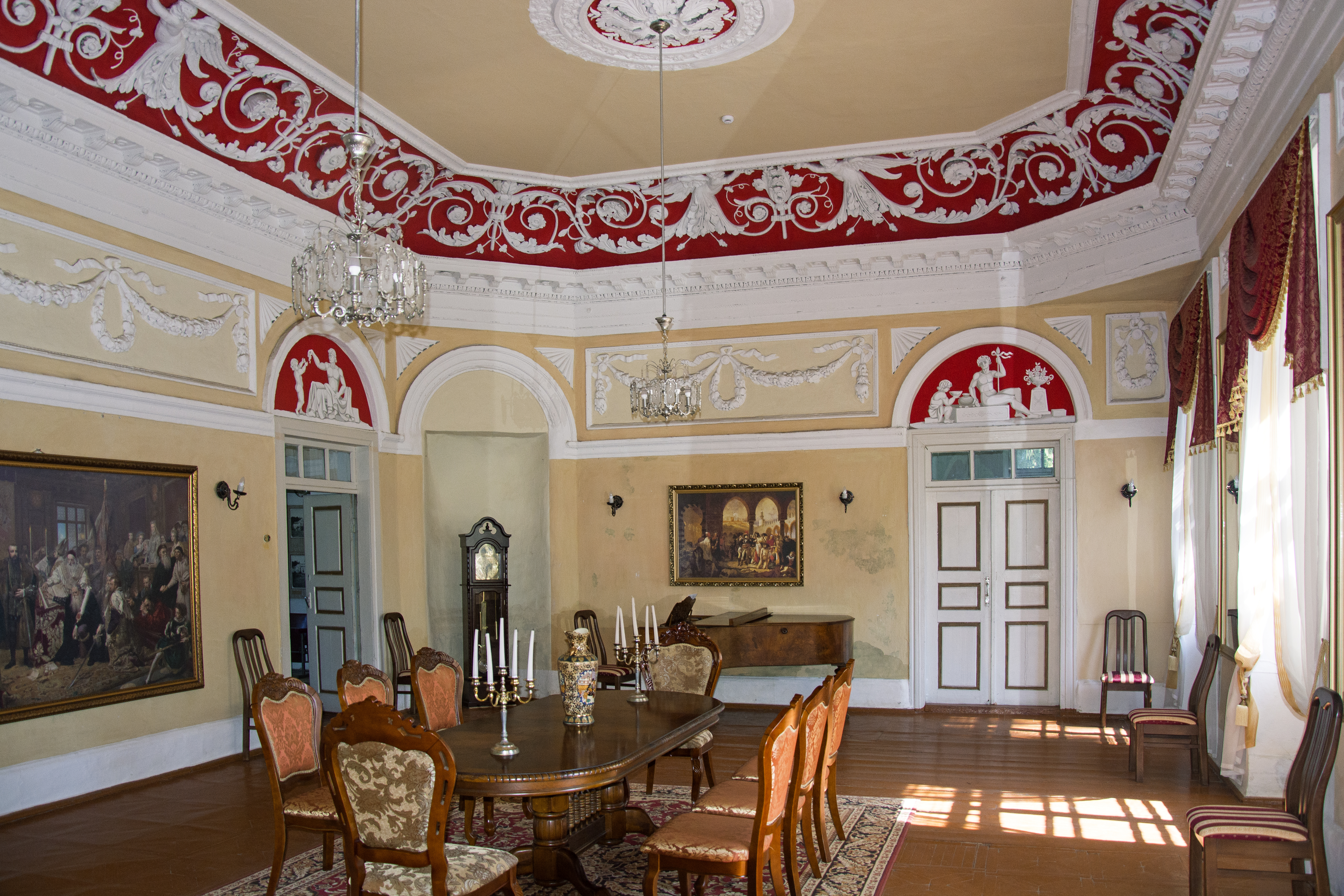
The Great Room

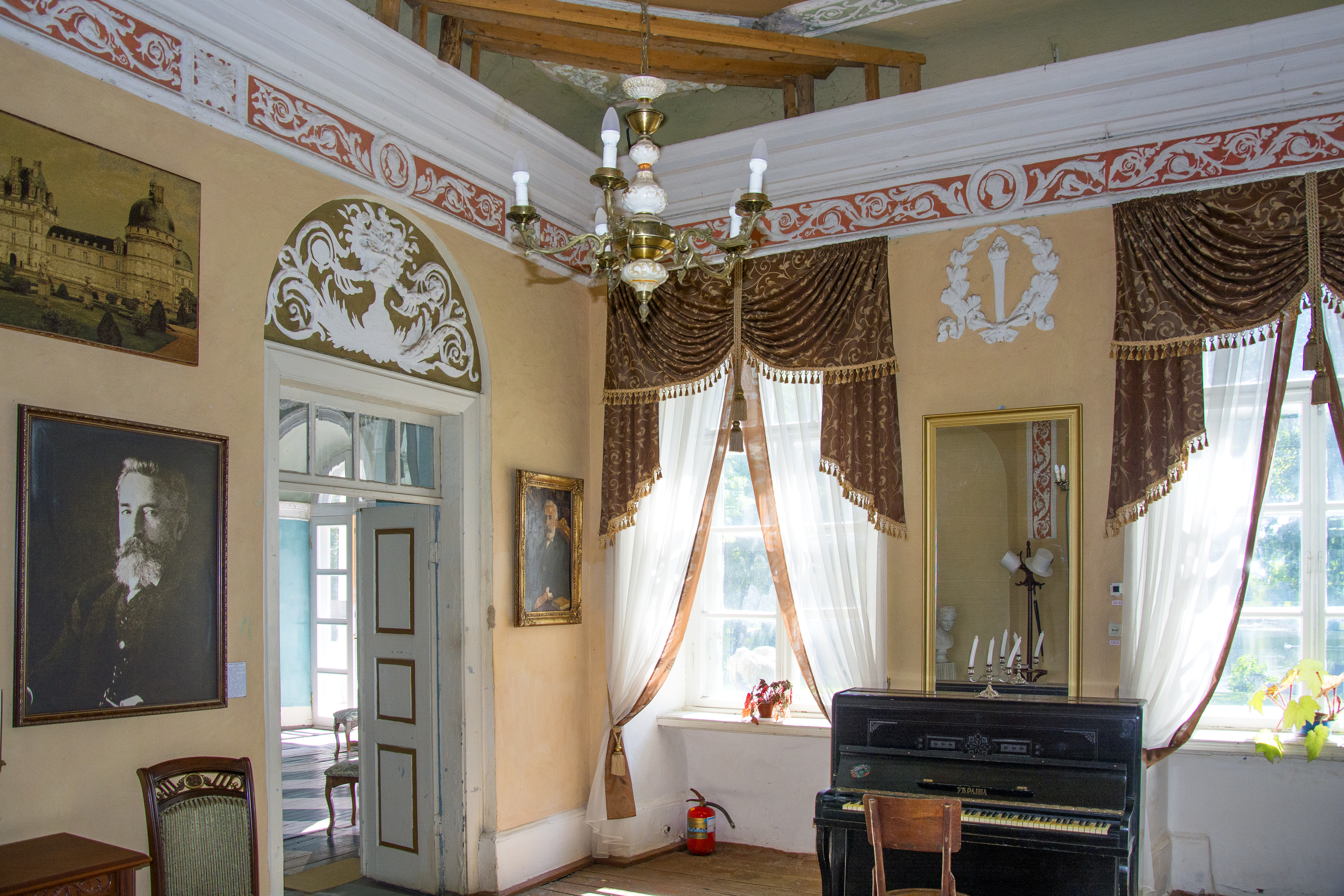
The Resting Room

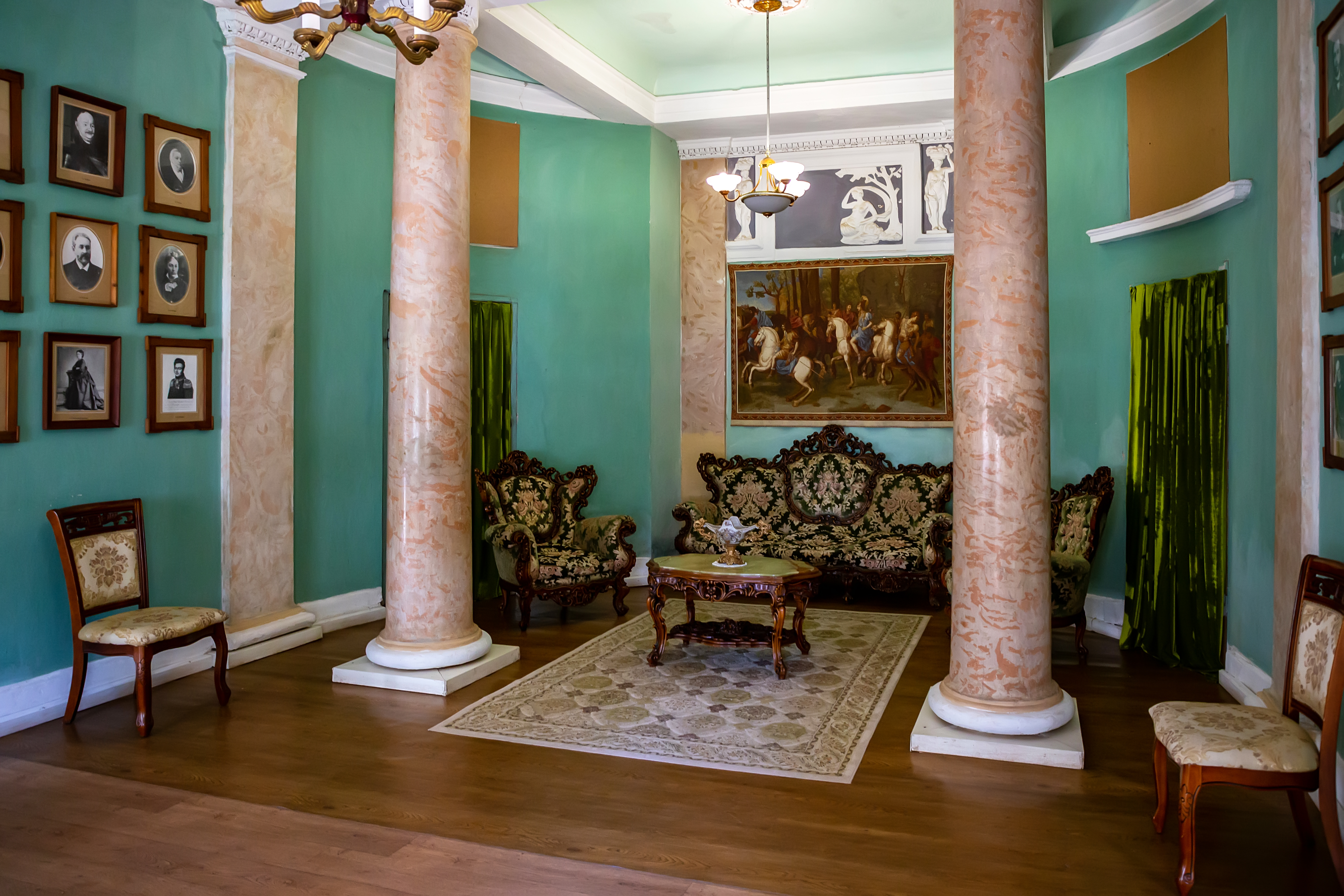
The Roman Room

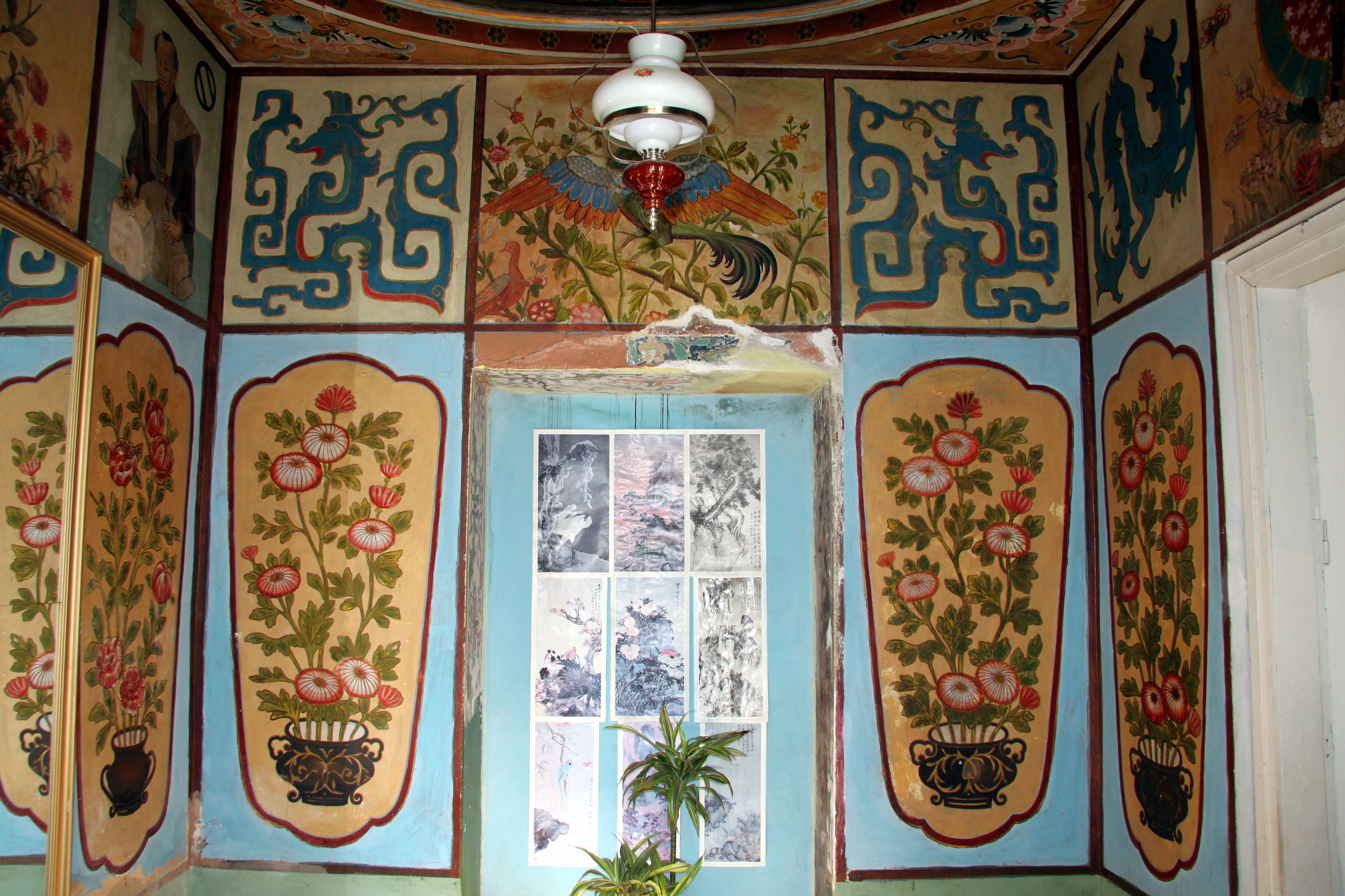
Frescos in the Japanese Room

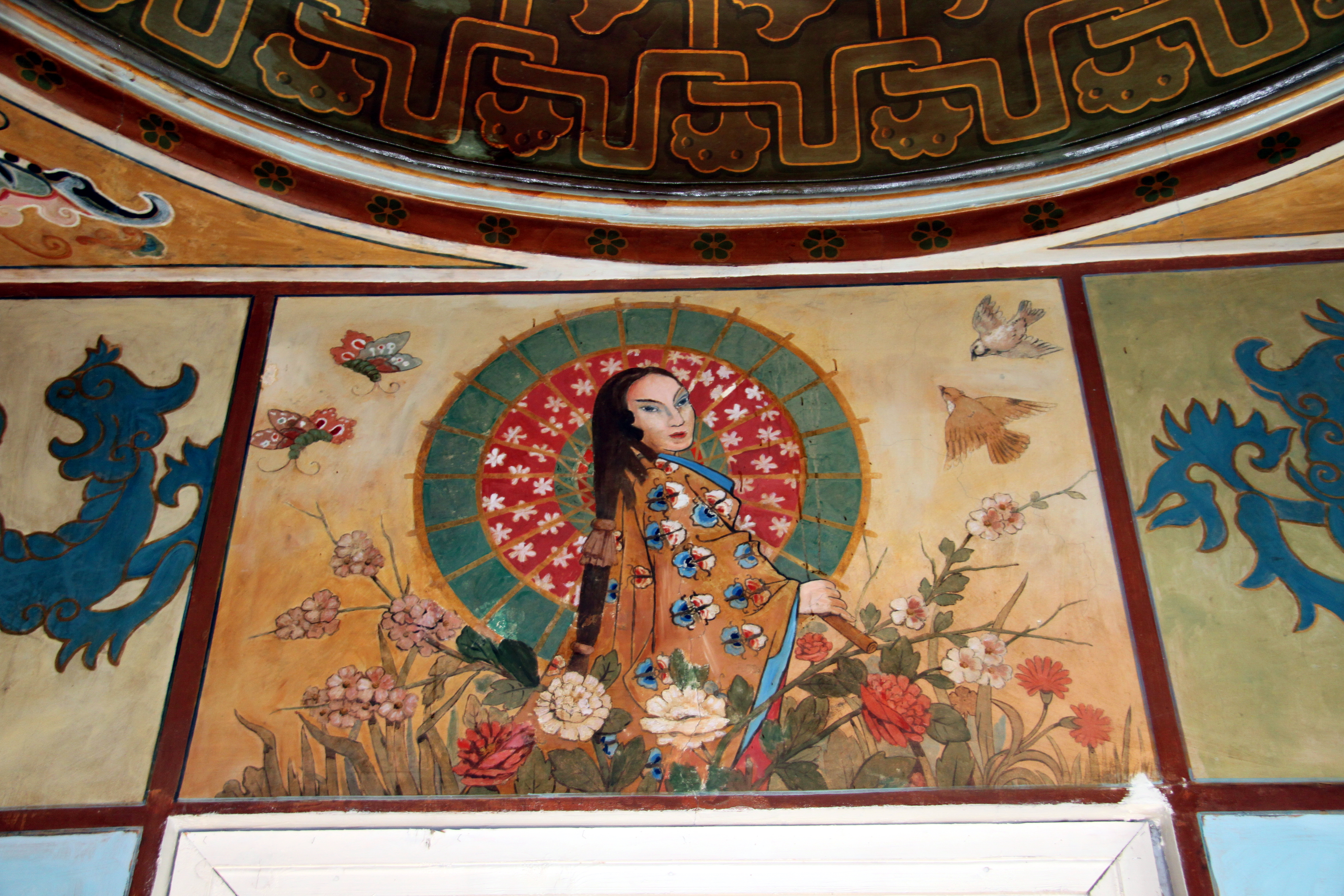
Frescos in the Japanese Room

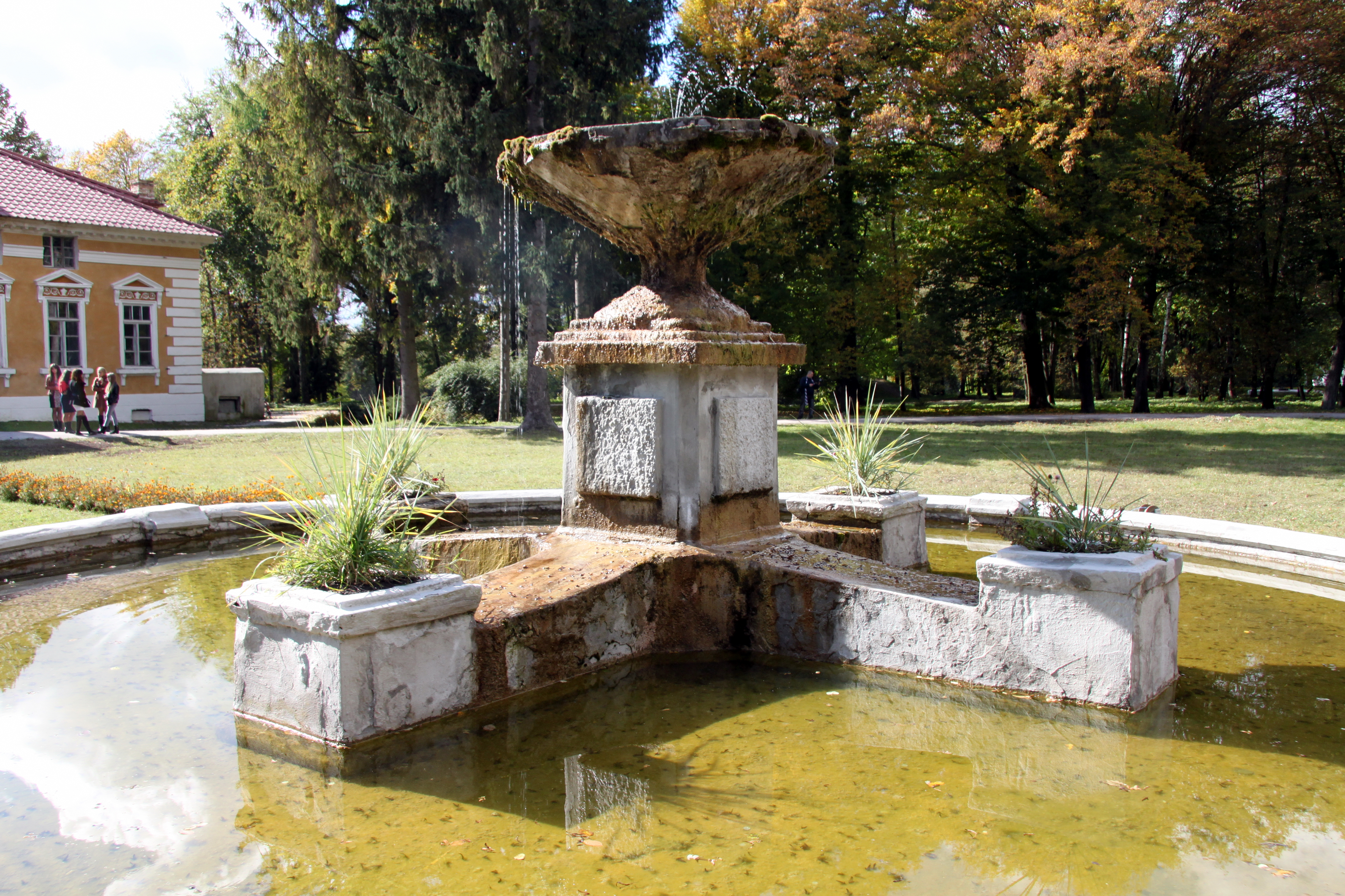
The fountain

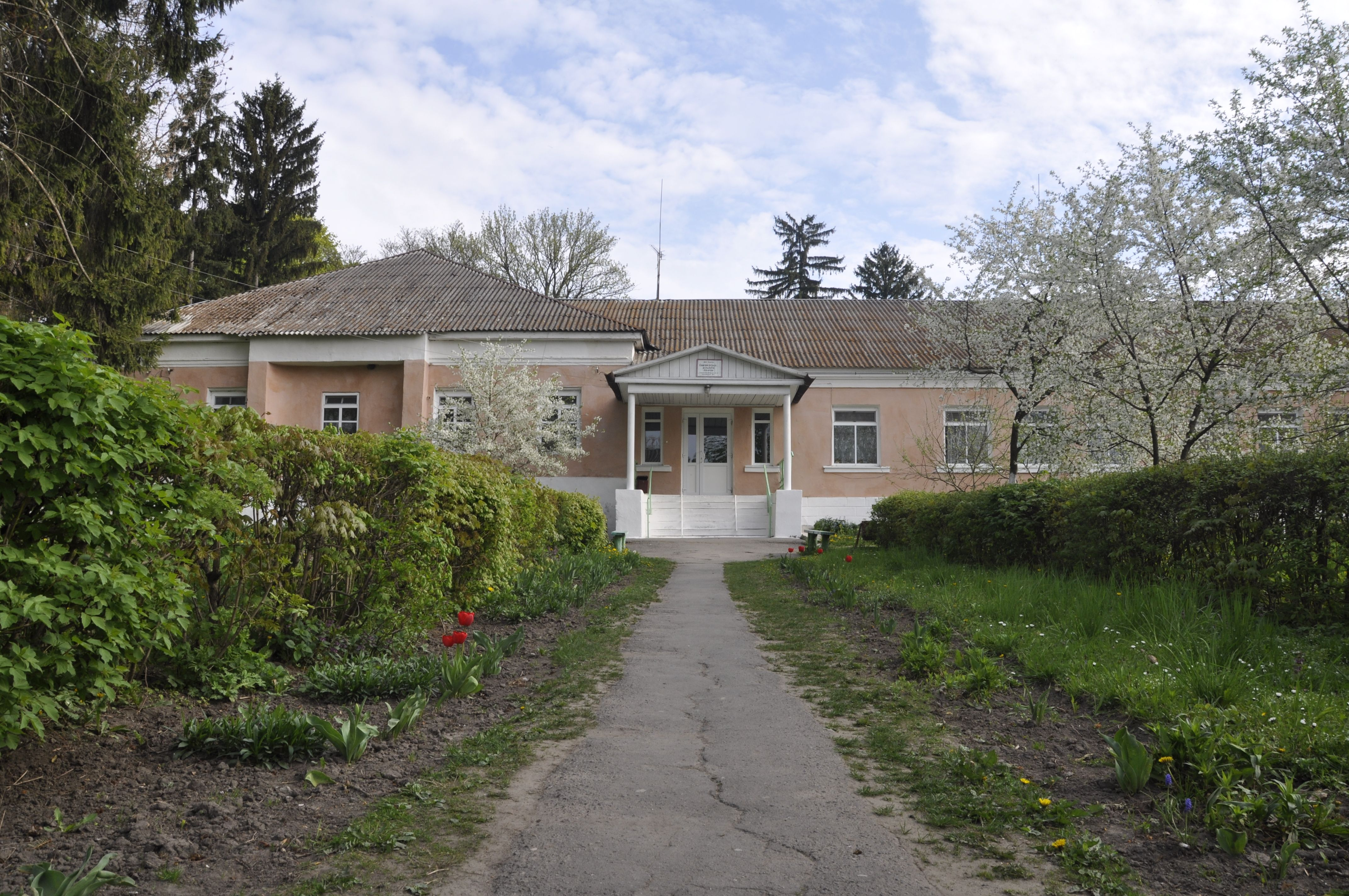
The Chojecki's Palace (The Old Palace)

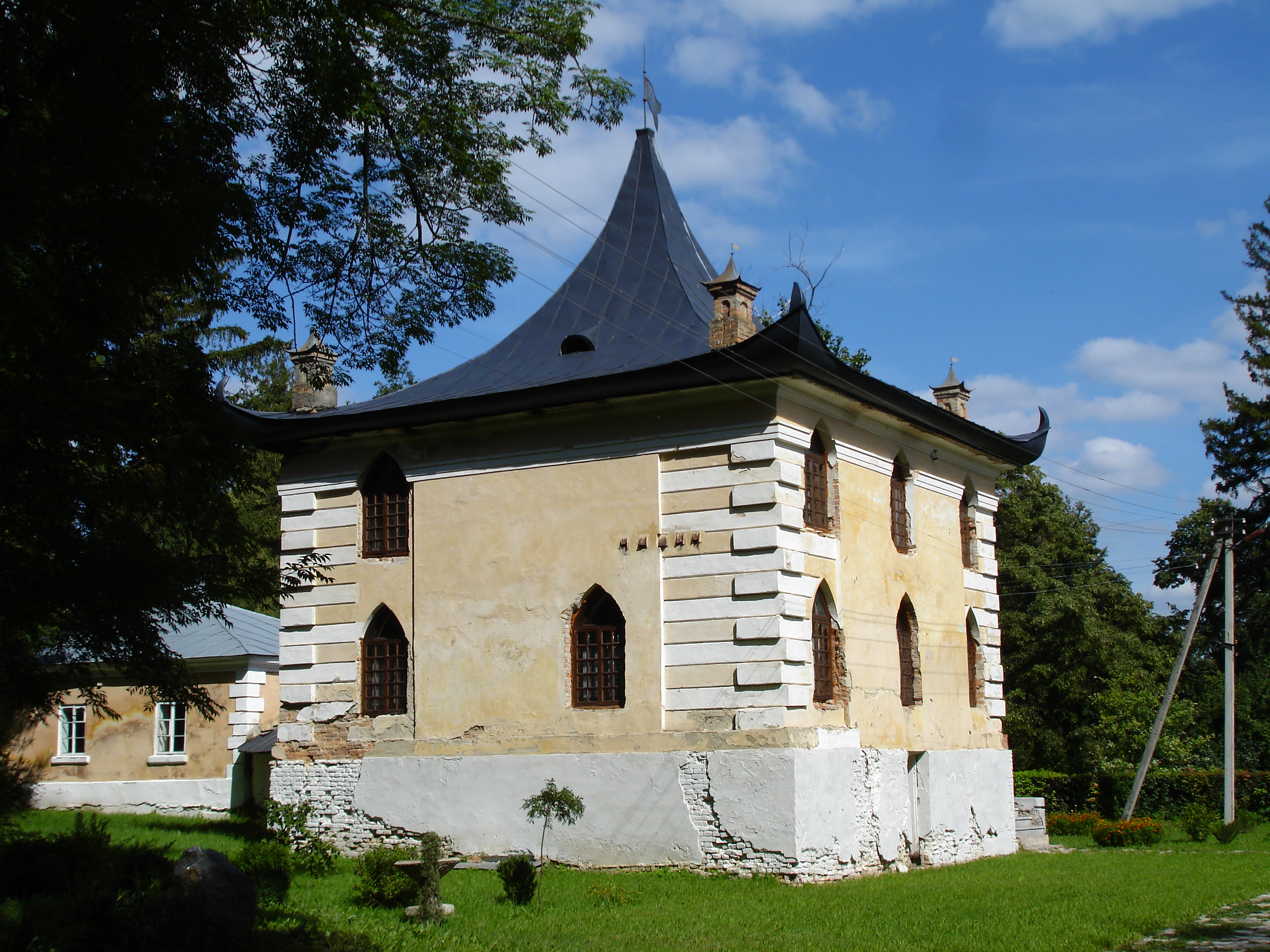
The Chinese House

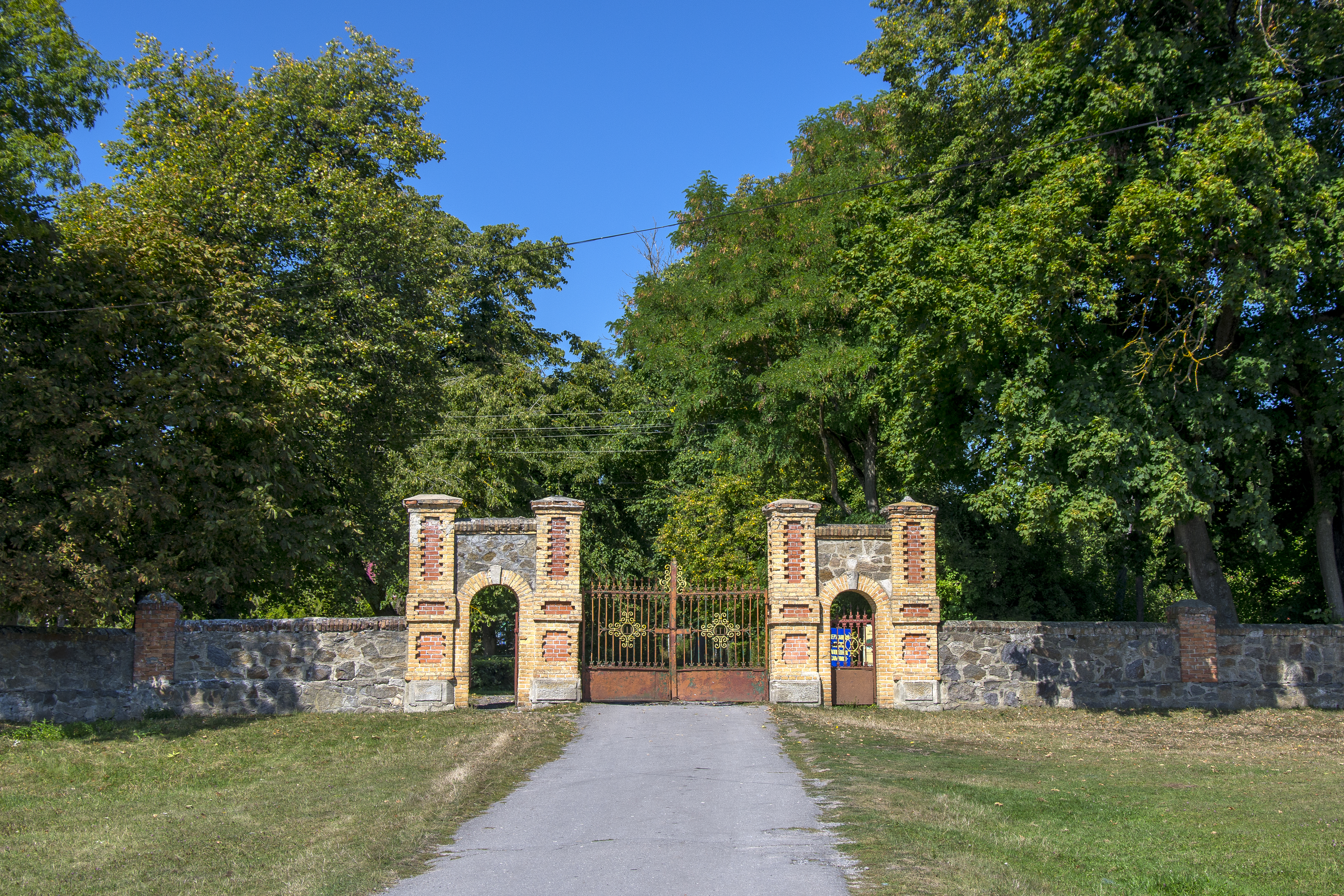
Main Gates

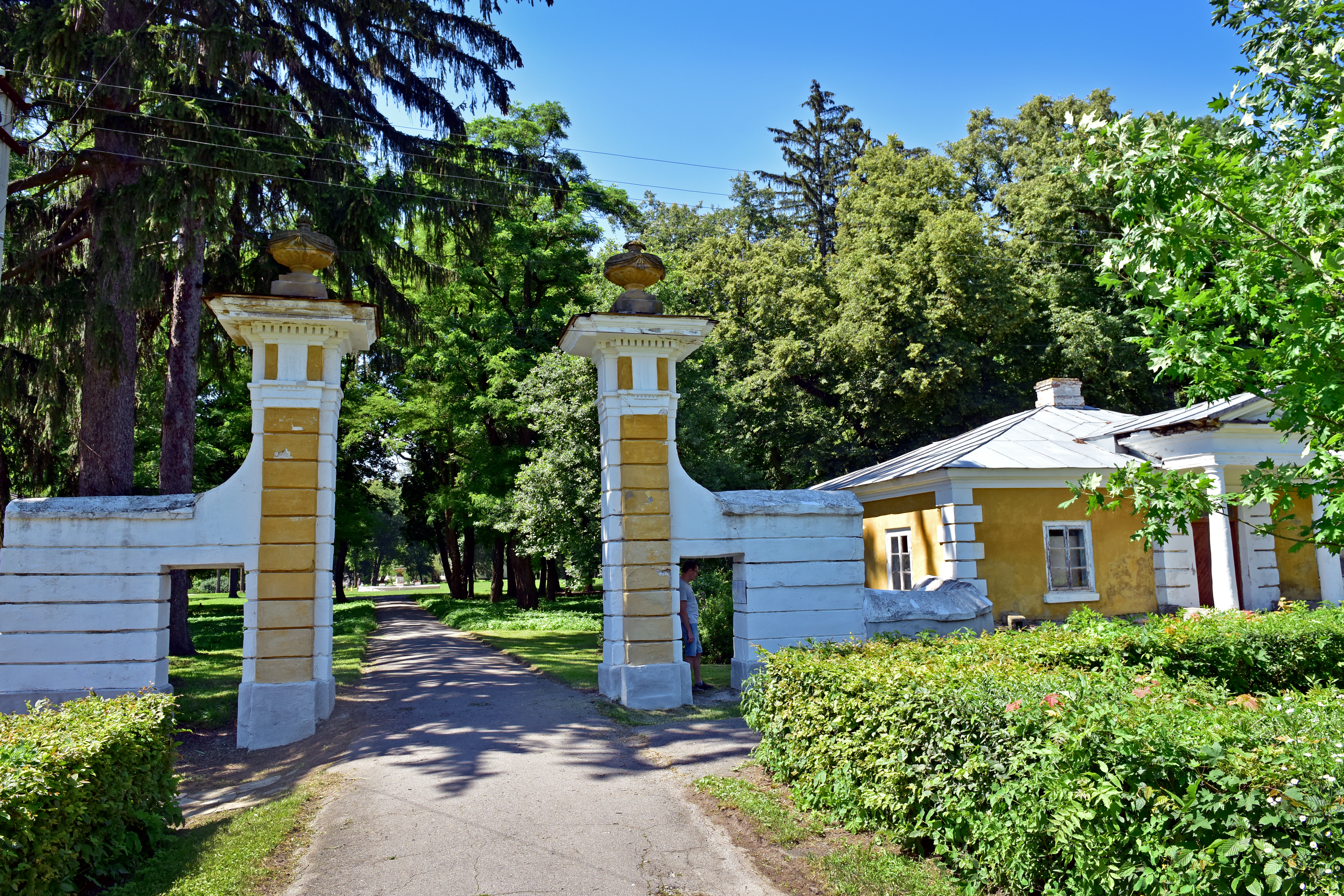
Hunter's Gates

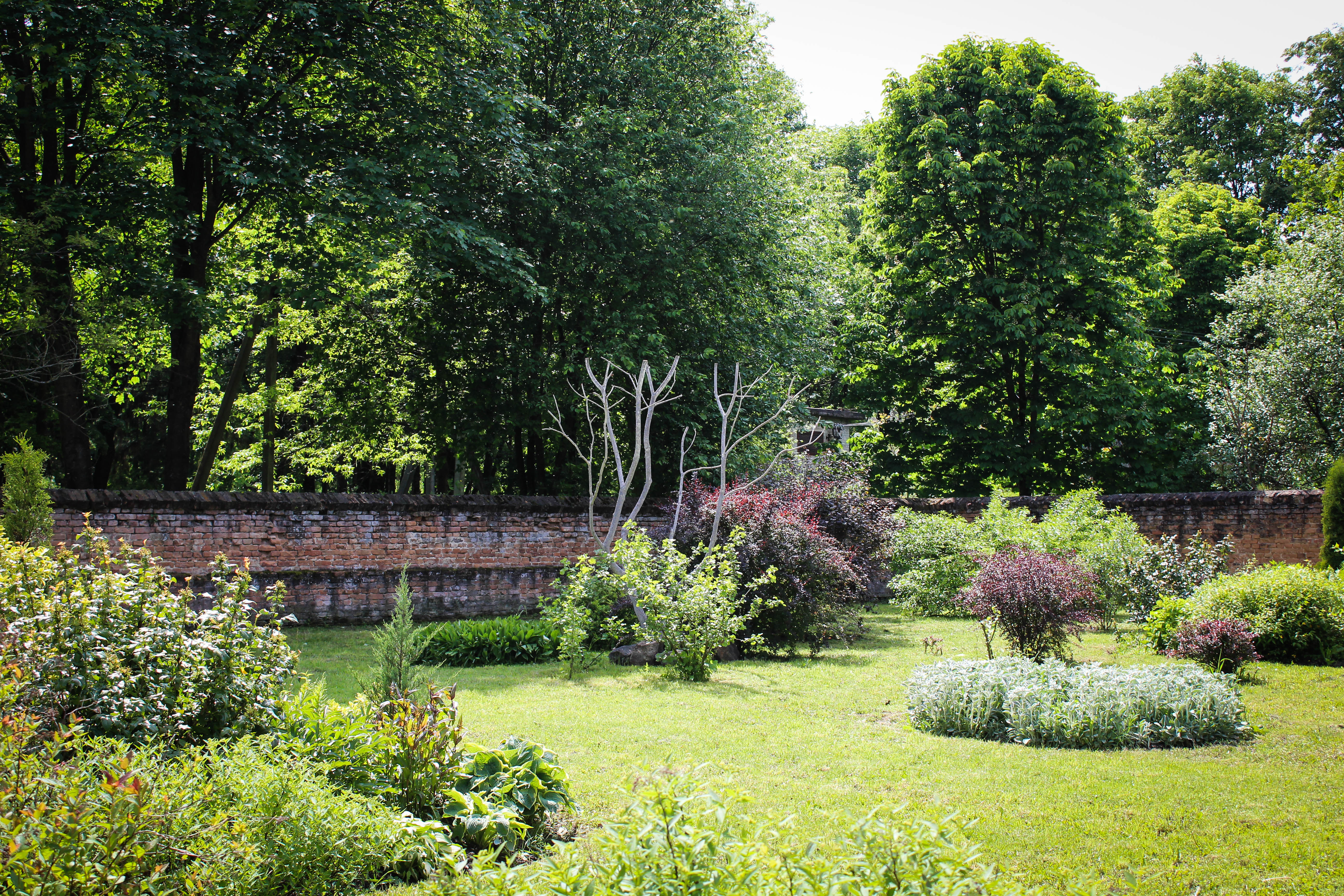
Garden within walls

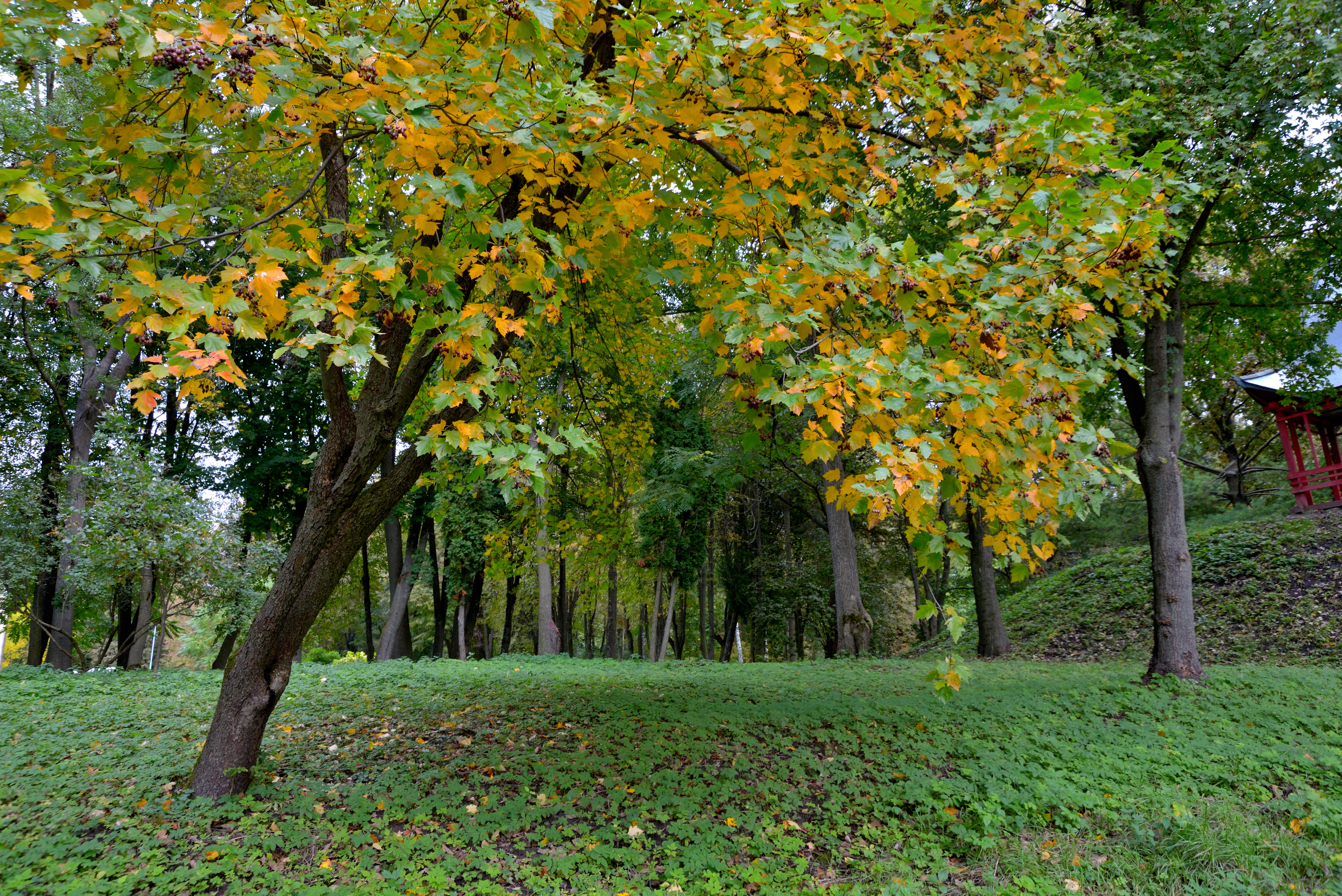
Trees in the park

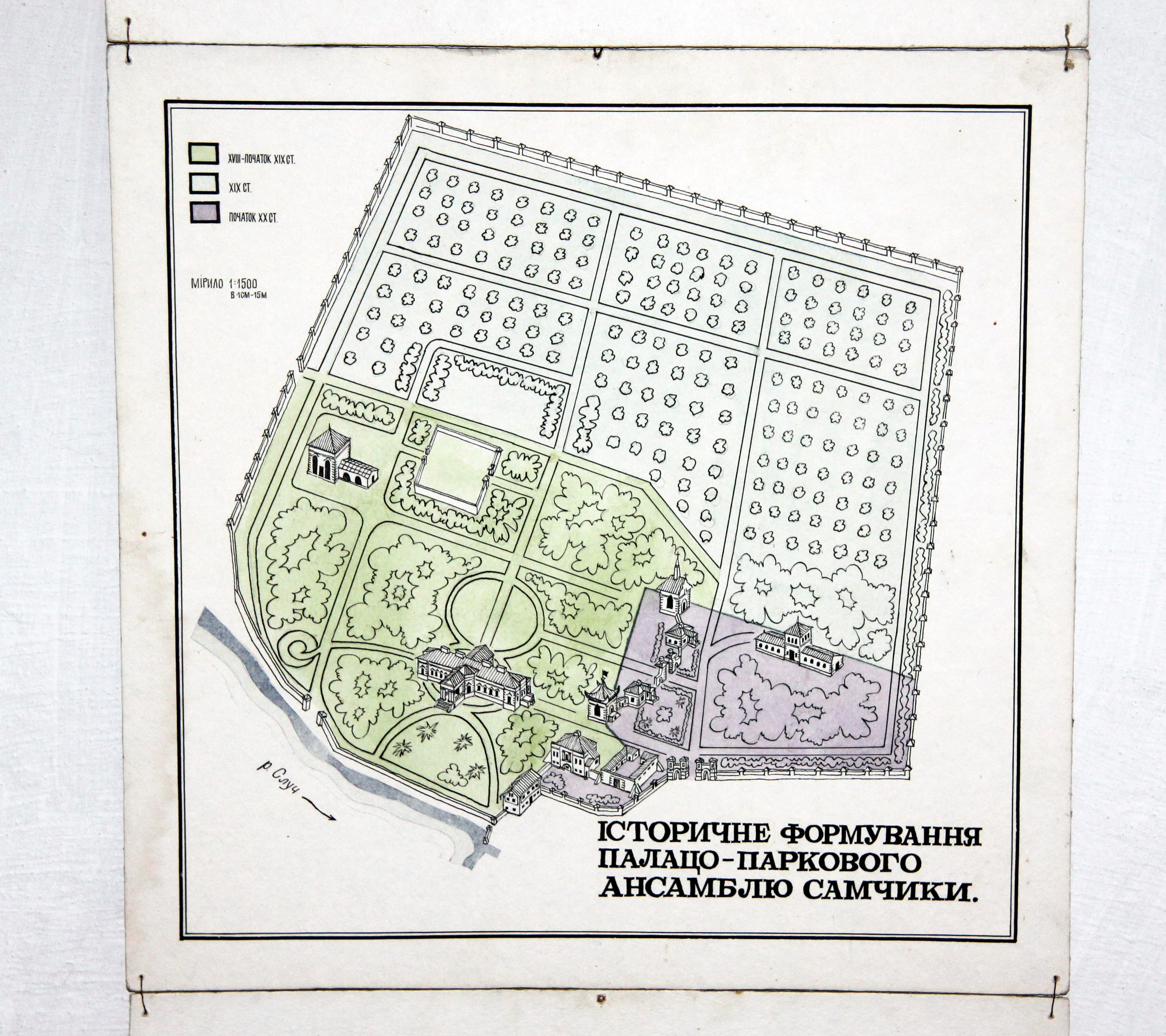
Map of the Samchyky Palace and Park Ensemble

== See also ==
- Kachanivka Palace
