= Marian Tomaszewski =

Polish army commander (1922–2020)

Colonel Marian Bronisław Tomaszewski
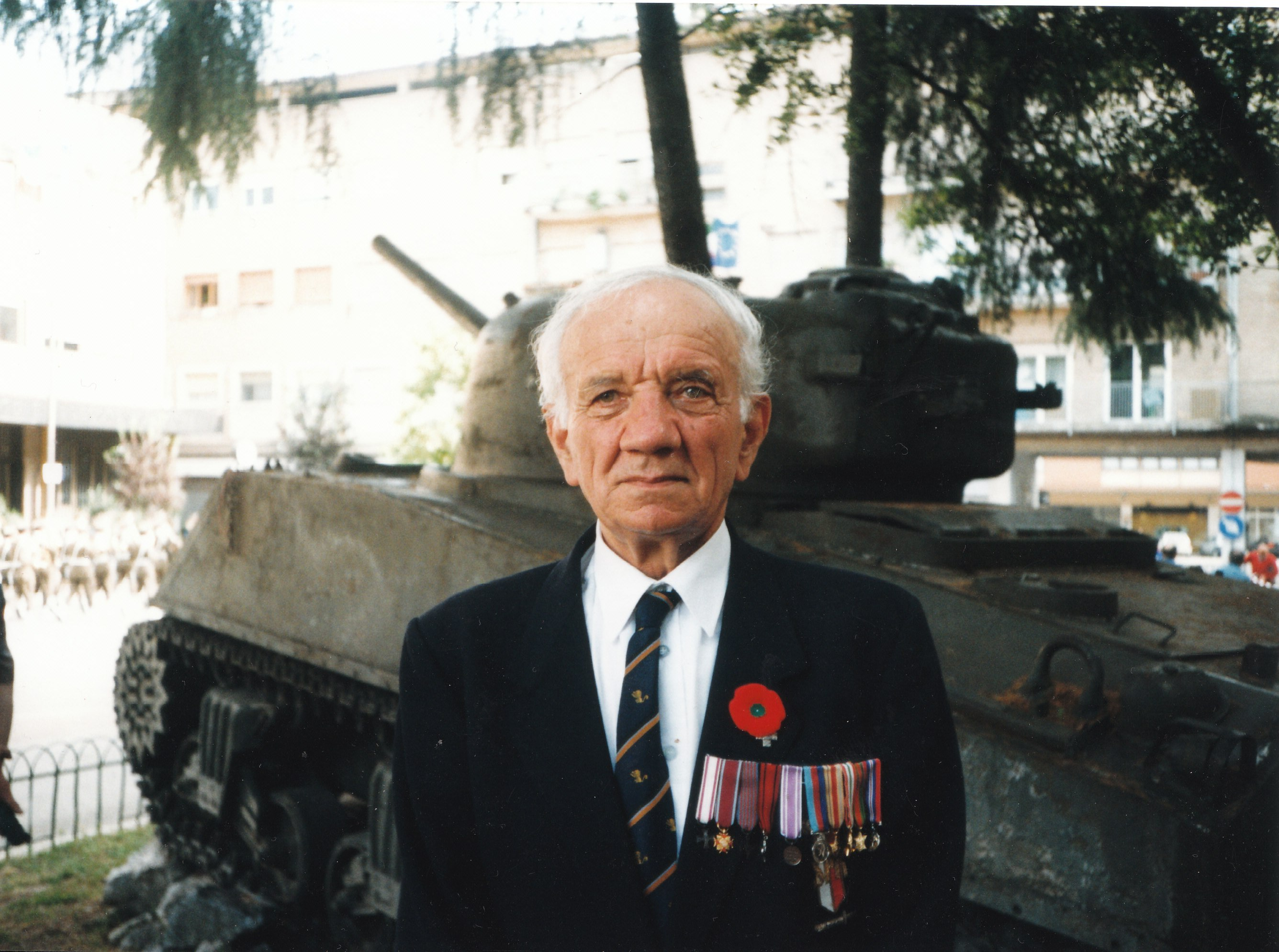
- Marian Bronisław Tomaszewski Cassino, Italy 2011
- Born: 13 August 1922; Przemyśl, Poland
- Died: 5 June 2020 (aged 97); Bury, England
- Military career
- Allegiance: Second Polish Republic, Polish government-in-exile
- Branch: Armour
- Rank: Colonel (Retd)
- Units: 2nd Armoured Brigade (Polish II Corps) 6th Armoured Regiment "Children of Lwów"
- Conflicts: World War II; Italian campaign Battle of Monte Cassino Battle of Piedimonte San Germano Battle of Ancona Battle of Bologna
- Awards: Commandrr's Cross of Polonia Restituta Cross of Valour, 2 times Cross of Merit (I Class with Swords) Silver Cross of Merit Cross of Monte Cassino (Poland)

Marian Bronisław Tomaszewski (13 August 1922 – 5 June 2020) was a Polish scout leader, an officer of the 2nd Polish Corps and a tank commander in the 6th Armoured Regiment "Children of Lwów" during World War II. After the war he spent nearly 45 years in exile in Italy and the United Kingdom where he later settled. He was regarded as one of the leaders of the Polish community in Manchester. He was the head of the Tomaszewski family, which acquired the Palace of Pławowice at the turn of the millennium.

== Second World War ==
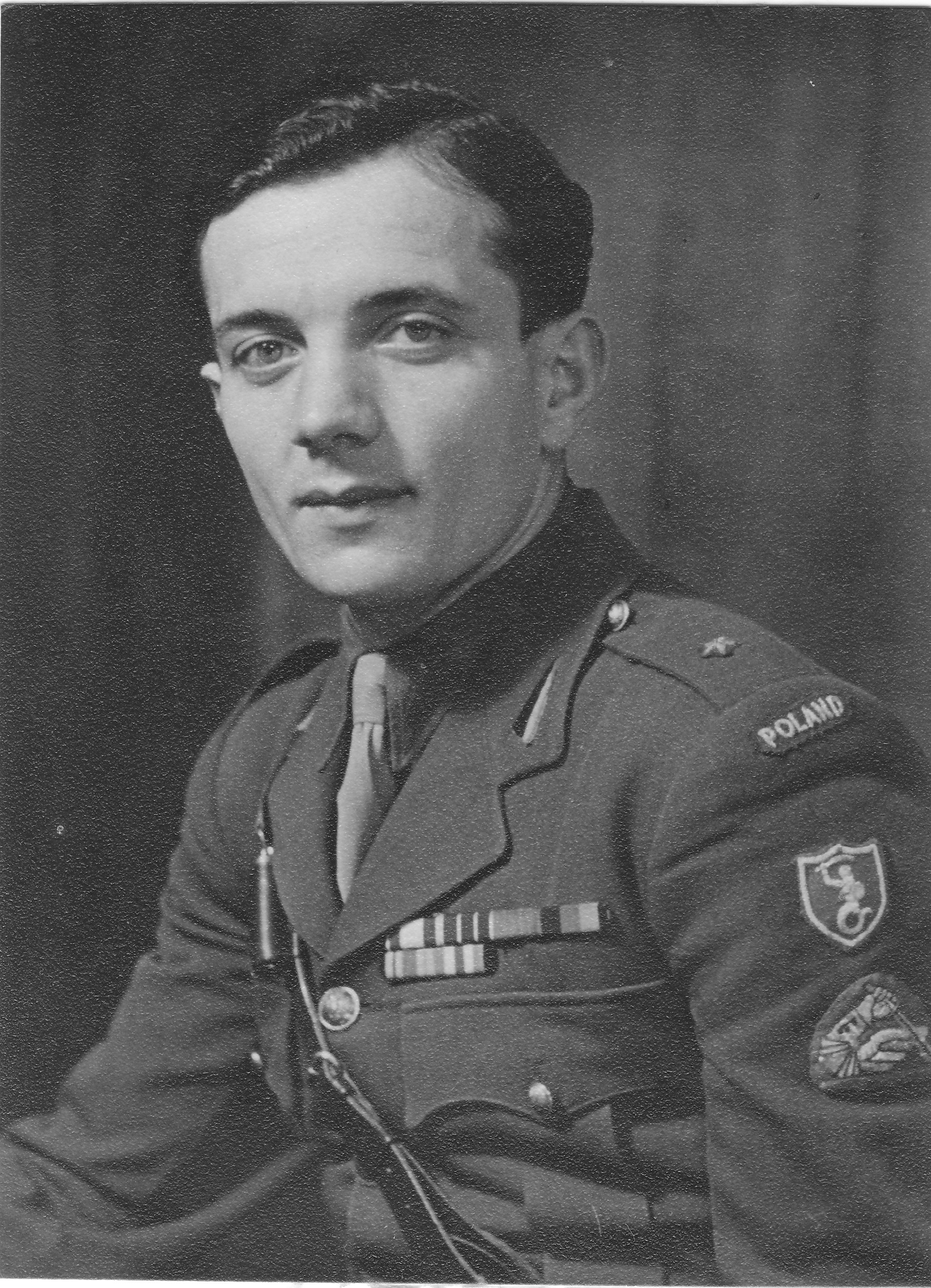
Marian Bronisław Tomaszewski as a Lieutenant

Tomaszewski lived in the Winna Góra villa district of Przemyśl. At high school he had risen to leader or Drużynowy of the Scouting Movement in the area. At the outbreak of the Second World War in September 1939, Tomaszewski was only 17 years old and ineligible for active military duty. However, he persuaded the recruiting officer to accept his enlistment and he served in an artillery battery until the end of fighting on 6 October. Due to his leadership role in Scouting, the Gestapo issued a warrant for Tomaszewski's immediate arrest, obliging him to escape into Soviet controlled Przemyśl by crossing the river San under cover of darkness.

Unknown to him, a similar warrant had been issued by the Soviet secret police, the NKVD, and he was captured and sentenced to 15 years hard labour in Siberia for "counter-revolutionary activity". Within the first two years of imprisonment, Tomaszewski (and his known aliases) are recorded to have escaped seven times from the Soviet authorities. He was, during his seventh attempt, preparing to cross Afghanistan into British controlled India when the Sikorski-Maisky Pact was signed when with the German invasion of the Soviet Union on 22 June 1941, the Soviet leader Joseph Stalin began to seek help from other countries opposing Germany.

Tomaszewski was enlisted in the newly established Anders' Army, a Polish Army with which thousands of Polish soldiers and civilians were able to leave the Soviet Union to which they had been forcibly deported. Tomaszewski was assigned to the 16th Infantry Regiment of the army. He underwent military training in Persia, Iraq, Palestine and Egypt. Later, in an ad-hoc multinational regiment, he participated in the disarming of Vichy troops stationed in Syrian forts as his first assignment.

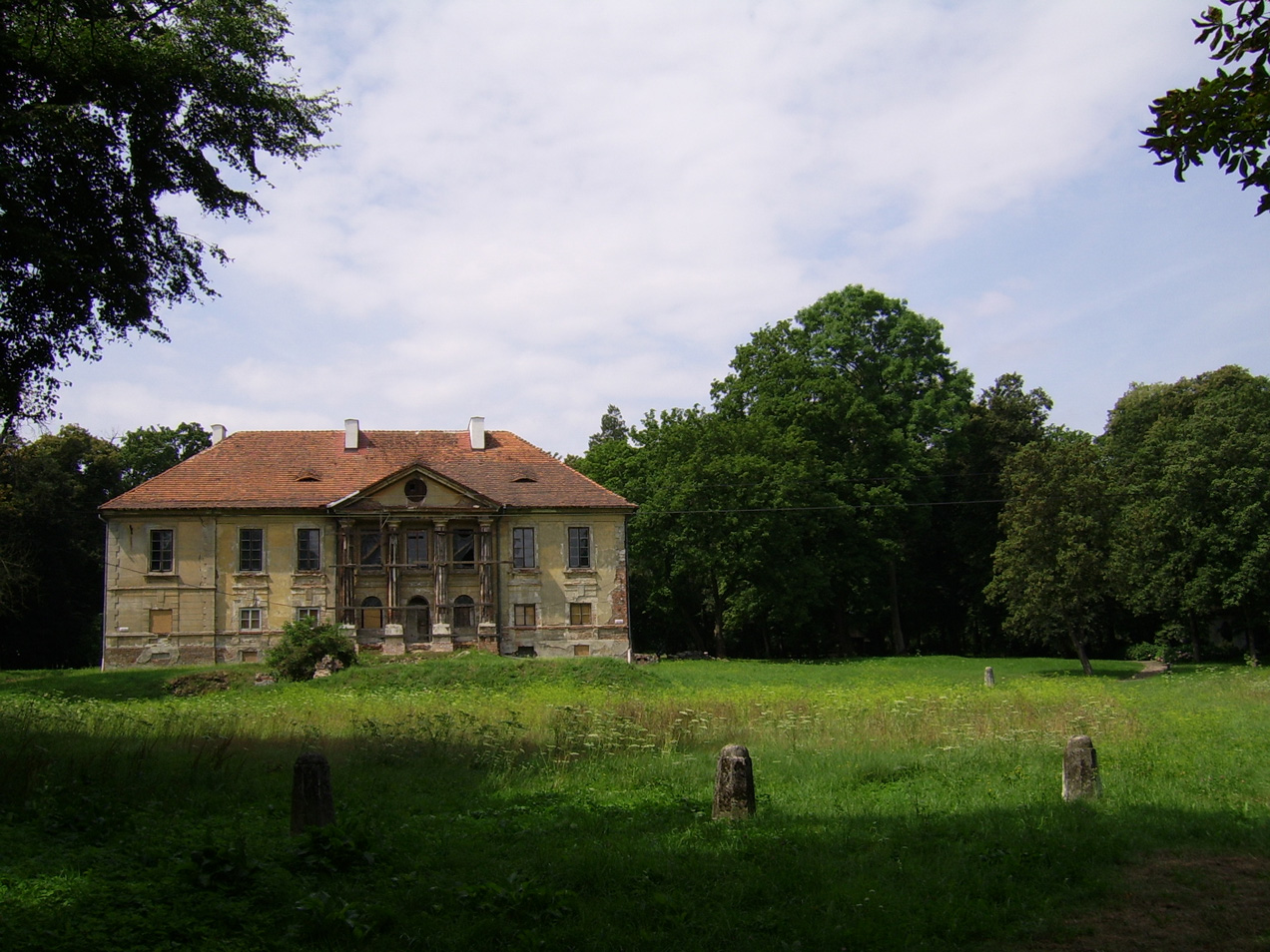
The classicist Pławowice palace in 2007

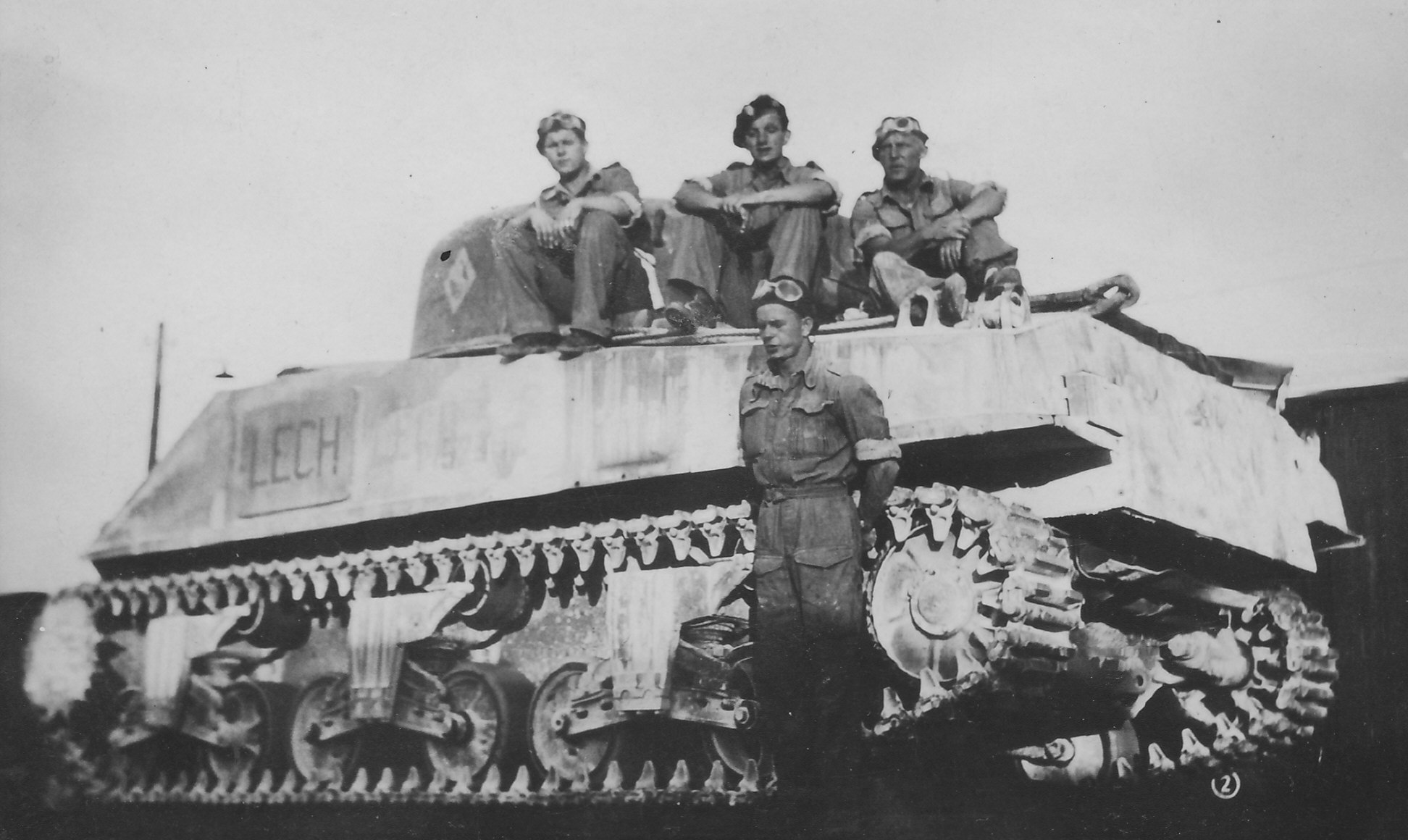
Marian Bronisław Tomaszewski (top middle) with tank crew, Italy

In 1941 Tomaszewski was assigned to the 6th Armoured Regiment "Children of Lwów", which at the time was still a Reconnaissance Battalion formed and designated for special duties, as an independent unit. As a cadet officer he left the Soviet Union in Spring 1942, and was sent to Egypt via Iraq and Palestine to undertake radio & signals training. While in Egypt the situation at Gazala became so desperate that his signals course was suspended and by June 1942, he was, along with other members on his course, requisitioned ad hoc under British command, ferried by night to Tobruk and posted on the front line. He took part in the Second Battle of Tobruk and was evacuated by sea under Stuka bombardment before its fall. He was one of the few Poles to have been both captive in the Soviet Union and to have seen action in North Africa, for which he received the Africa star. He went on to complete his radio training in Egypt and rejoined his unit, the bulk of which left the Soviet Union in Autumn 1942, now in Iraq. By the end of 1942 the 6th Reconnaissance Battalion was transformed into the 6th Armoured Regiment and Tomaszewski now retrained as a tank commander.

In 1944 he was engaged in the bloody Battle of Monte Cassino. Following the fall of the monastery on 18 May, Polish forces faced the Hitler Line which blocked the road to Rome. Tomaszewski, was in one of the first platoons to assault the strongpoint of Piedimonte San Germano in Sherman tanks on 20 May , at the time the most fortified position in Italy held by detachments of crack German paratroopers equipped with anti-tank emplacements. During the 2nd day of the battle the 6th armoured regiment headquarters was badly hit by heavy artillery, seriously wounding the regiment's commander Lt. Col Henryk Świetlicki, and combined with heavy losses command and communication began to break down. Tomaszewski, posted to regimental HQ and in part owing to his previous signals training, regained control of the situation and continued to direct the armoured assault from the frontline until new command was established. Although faced with difficult terrain, the lack of expected Indian infantry support and dogged German resistance they succeeded in breaching the Hitler Line and taking the town. The anniversary of the town's liberation is still celebrated by its inhabitants. Tomaszewski was wounded by shrapnel at the Gothic line but returned to active duty within 2 months, he continued to serve in the 2nd Polish Corps until the end of the Italian Campaign in 1945.

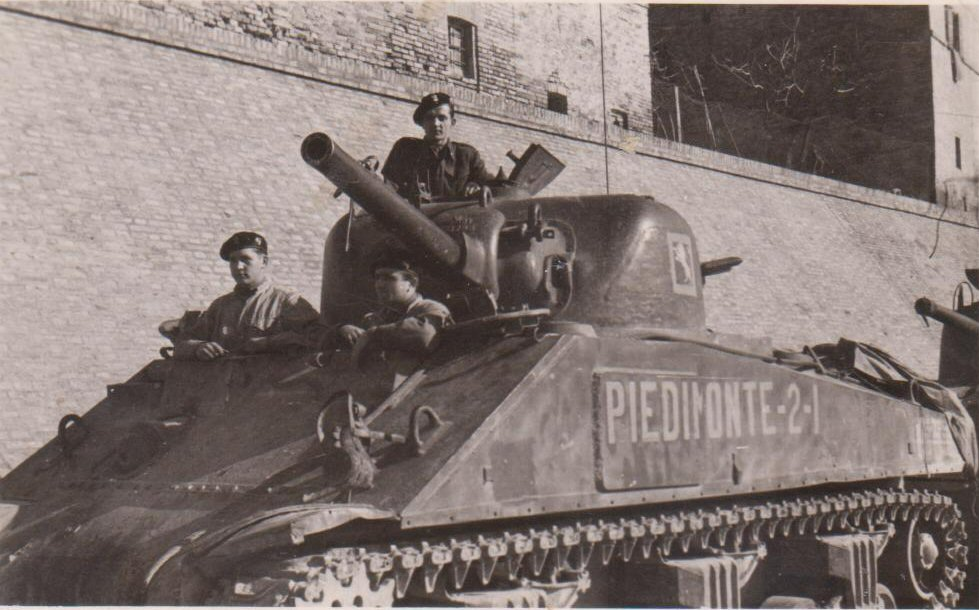
Marian Bronisław Tomaszewski with Sherman "Piedimonte", Italy

== Post-war ==
After the end of the Second World War, Poland fell behind the Soviet Iron Curtain, with a puppet Communist government. Tomaszewski was warned by Polish sources that the Polish Secret Service (UB) had marked him for arrest as an "enemy of the proletariat" should he ever return to his homeland. After some years in Italy, Tomaszewski moved to Great Britain where he continued his studies at Trinity College, Dublin, the University of Glasgow and the University of Edinburgh. He founded the Bury Polish Circle and remained an active member of the Polonia community. He died in Bury, England in June 2020 at the age of 97.

== Palace of Pławowice ==
Colonel Marian Bronisław Tomaszewski was the owner of the Palace of Pławowice. In 2004 he and his daughter Maria organised and funded the Third Reunion of Poets in order to revive the literary and scholarly traditions dating back to the era of its original founders, the Morstin family. Despite the desperate state of the palace and the heinous damage caused to the building by years of communist era neglect, the Tomaszewski family have undertaken costly steps to secure fragile sections of the building and they plan to renovate the whole palace. Tomaszewski was quoted in the Polish language newspaper published in Britain, Dziennik Polski, as describing the palace's role not only as the family seat but also as an important place of Polish cultural heritage for the general public.

== Honours and awards ==
- Commander’s Cross of the Order of Polonia Restituta.
- Cross of Valour – two times
- Gold Cross of Merit
- Silver Cross of Merit
- Monte Cassino Cross
- Africa Star
- Italy Star
- 1939–1945 Star.
