= Church of the Holy Trinity, Podwale =

Church of the Holy Trinity in Podwale
- Church of the Holy Trinity in Podwale in Warsaw
- Cerkiew Świętej Trójcy na Podwalu w Warszawie; Церковь Святой Троицы на Подвале
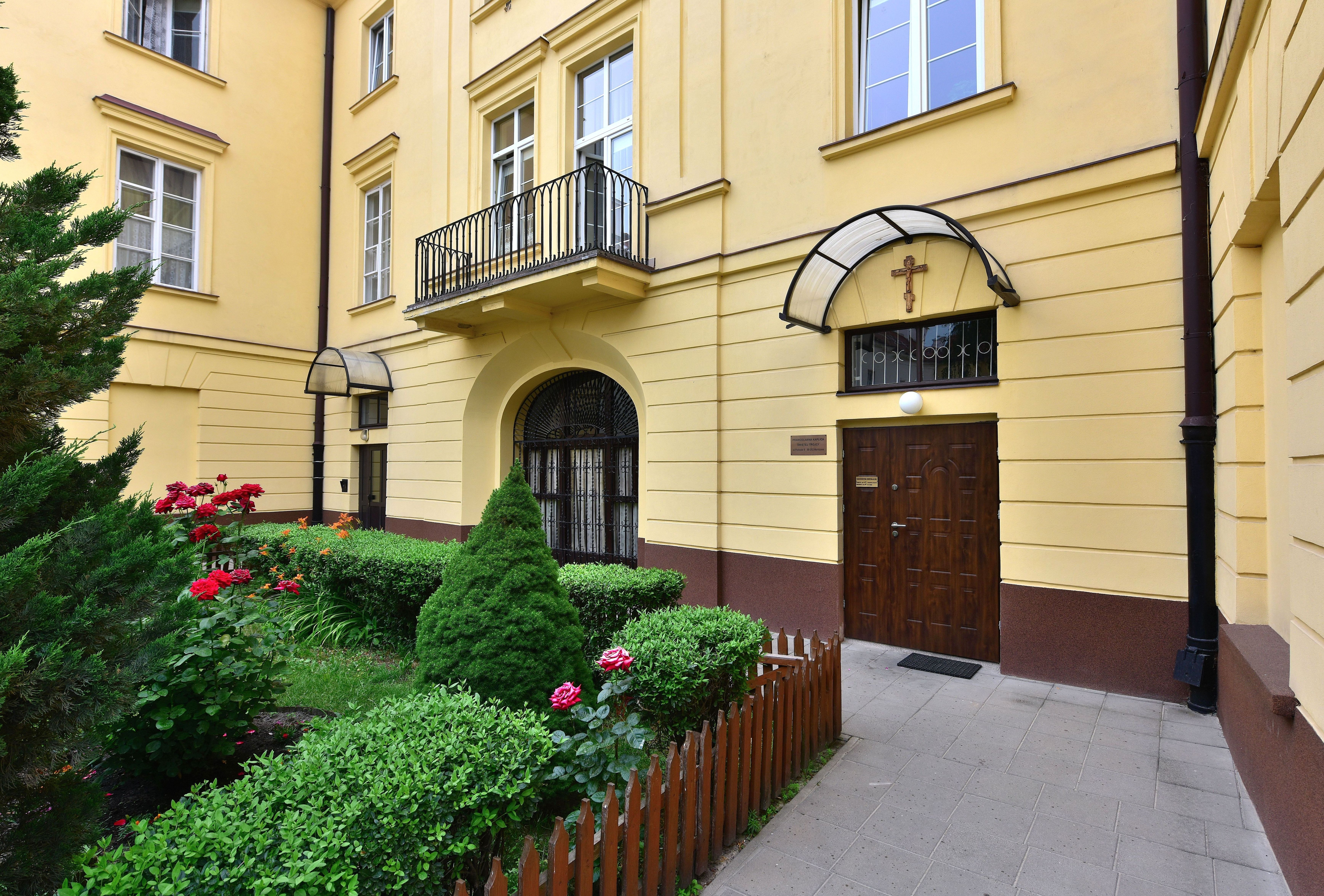
- Entrance to the Church of the Holy Trinity in Podwale
- Church of the Holy Trinity in Podwale
- 52°14′50.8″N 21°0′42.1″E
- Location: Warsaw
- Country: Poland
- Denomination: Polish Orthodox Church

History
- Founded: 1818
- Consecrated: November 25, 2002

Architecture
- Architect: Jakub Kubicki
- Style: Classical
- Completed: 1818

Specifications
- Materials: Brick

Administration
- Diocese: Warsaw-Bielsko
- Deanery: Warsaw

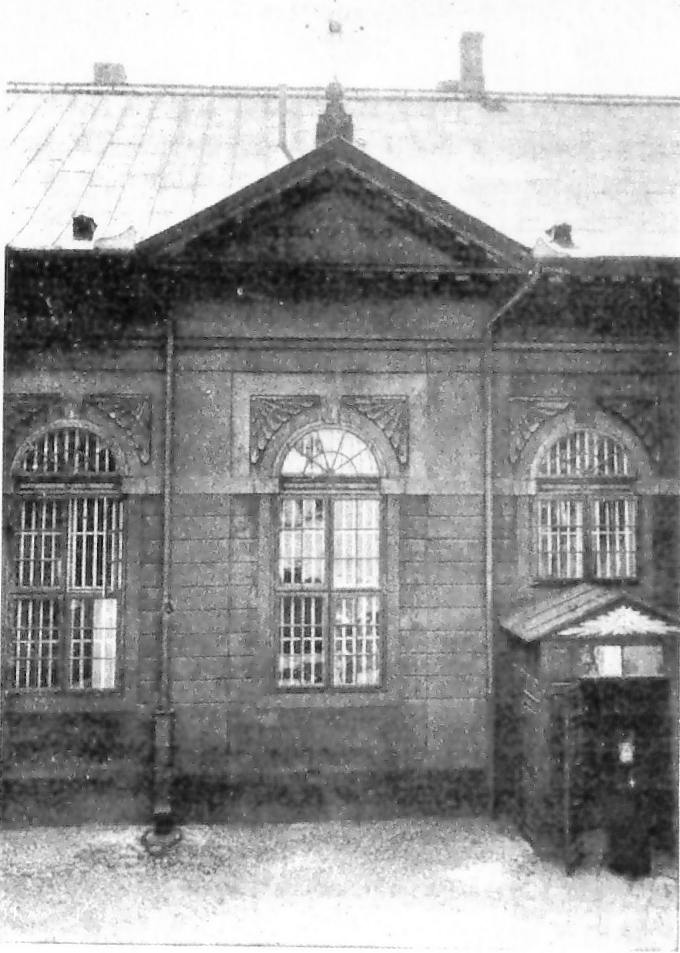
The Greek Orthodox Church in Warsaw

The Church of the Holy Trinity in Podwale is the oldest historic Orthodox church in Warsaw, located in a building at 5 Podwale Street. Currently, the church parish is part of the Warsaw deanery in the Warsaw-Bielsko diocese of the Polish Orthodox Church and it has a religious center for the Coptic Orthodox Church in Poland. From 2002 to 2012, it was also an academic church.

== History ==
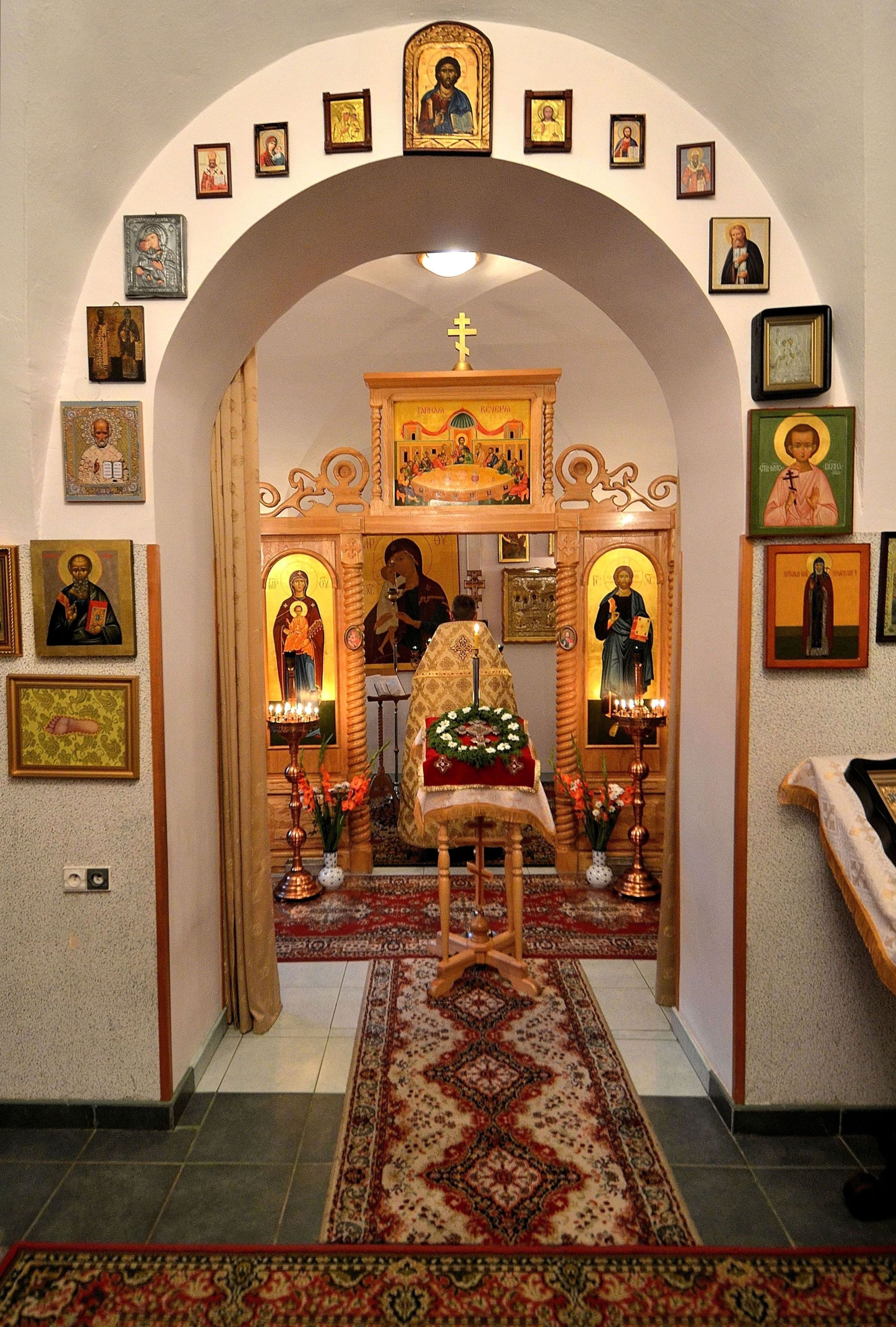
The interior of the church

In the 17th century, small groups of Greek merchants and Serbs who had fled Turkish rule, appeared in Warsaw (and in other major cities in Poland). They asked the authorities many times for permission to build a church, which was consistently denied to them. An opportunity came after 1768 when there was more religious freedom in Poland. The first church was established in Warsaw in 1796, at the Sapieha Palace. This church functioned until 1806, when Napoleon's army occupied the palace. The church temporarily moved to the home of Mikołaj Dadani in Kozia Street.

In 1818, at the initiative of Greek merchants Dobrich, Barącz and Dadani, a house was purchased at 5 Podwale Street. In the yard, an Orthodox chapel was built to a design by Jakub Kubicki. It was a short, one-story, modestly decorated building in the style of a classical rectangle. The church had three walls adjacent to neighbouring buildings, with the entrance on the side, from the north-east. The church featured a three-row iconostasis, into which icons were placed which had been imported from Greece or bought from French soldiers retreating from Russia. The original building included a furnished apartment for the pastor and a parish room.

The Orthodox faithful were unable to get a permanent priest in Warsaw until 1825 when the church was overseen by the Orthodox bishops of Bukovina, and it later came under the jurisdiction of the Russian Orthodox Church. For two years, it was subject to their diocese of Minsk, and from 1827 to the Eparchy of Volyn (based in Kremenets).

Only in 1828 did the church receive a permanent pastor, Father Theophilus Nowicki, who was sent from Kremenets, and at the time the parish only had 62 followers. In 1832, the Government of the Russian Empire committed 6000 rubles for the repair of the church and the purchase of new icons for the iconostasis. In 1834, the Warsaw Orthodox diocese was founded. Until the ordination of the Russified Church of the Holy Trinity in 1837, this modest, inconspicuous Orthodox church, served as the cathedral for the Orthodox Bishop of Warsaw. It later functioned as a parish church.

After World War I, the church, popularly called "Podwałka" (a pun referring to the street name and the Russian word подвал - "cellar" - an allusion to the humble appearance of the church), remained in the hands of the Orthodox Church, serving mainly post-revolutionary Russian emigrants. Father Antoni Rudlewski, formerly a pastor in Łódź, and one of the few Orthodox clergy who evacuated in 1915 but remained in Russia's annexed lands which were under German military occupation, was appointed as the pastor of the Holy Trinity. After his retirement in 1937, he was replaced by Father Aleksander Subbotin.

In September 1939, during the invasion of Poland, it was hit by a falling bomb, which started a fire that was quickly extinguished. After removal of the devastation, the makeshift church was active until 1944. During the Warsaw Uprising, it was completely destroyed, along with the entire Old Town. From 24 to 31 August it was defended by troops of the AK "Gustav" battalion, including the sanitary patrol "Ewa–Maria", which was unable to control the fires, so the church was evacuated. During the bombing of the house a vicar from the parish, Father Jerzy Łotocki, his wife, son, and mother-in-law, all died. The last pastor of the Holy Trinity, Father Aleksander Subbotin, was moved to the Soviet Union in 1945. He was arrested in Odessa, and was murdered by the NKVD.

After the war, the building, along with the ruins of the church, was nationalized. The front tenement was rebuilt, and the property was earmarked for residential purposes, while the ruins of the chapel in the courtyard were levelled.

In 1998, the Polish Orthodox Church made efforts to reclaim the property and regained it on 1 March 2002. The ground floor of the church was decorated again with new iconostasis made in Bielsk Podlaski by students from the Postgraduate Studies of Iconography (Policealne Studium Ikonograficzne) post-secondary school. On November 25, 2002, the church was re-consecrated.

From 2002 to 2012 it served as an academic church, from February 5, 2005, it has held liturgies in Polish, and from 2003 to 2012, a monthly devotion for the Coptic Church.

A surviving previous copy of the Pochayiv Mother of God icon is currently located in the new chapel, along with a silver Gospel Book, which had been stored in the Cathedral of St. Mary Magdalene, after it was found after the war in the rubble of the destroyed church. The former Kubicki chapel was not rebuilt.

The church was entered in the Register of Monuments on July 1, 1965, under No. 437.

== Bibliography ==
- Kalendarz Prawosławny 2005, Wydanie Warszawskiej Metropolii Prawosławnej, ISSN 1425-2171, ss.194-208 (in Polish)
- K. Sokoł, A. Sosna: Kopuły nad Wisłą, Prawosławne cerkwie w centralnej Polsce w latach 1815-1915, MID „SYNERGIA" Moskwa 2003, OCLC 749634498 (in Polish)
