= Ludwik Hieronim Morstin =

Soldier, diplomat, editor and poet

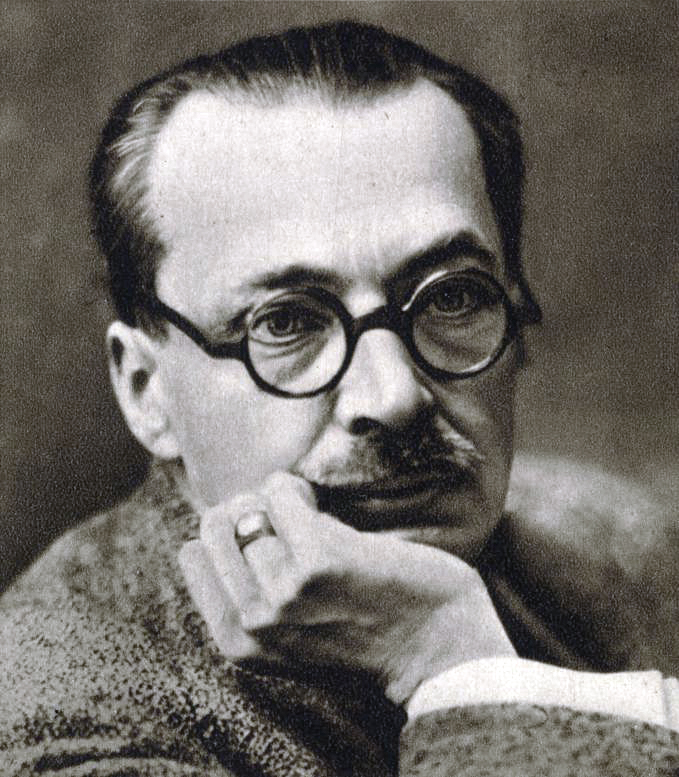
- Born: 12 December 1886; Pławowice
- Died: 12 May 1966 (aged 79); Warsaw
- Resting place: Powązki Cemetery, Warsaw
- Occupations: soldier, diplomat, editor, poet

Ludwik Hieronim Morstin (12 December 1886, Pławowice – 12 May 1966, Warsaw) was a soldier, diplomat, editor and poet.

== Biography ==
He was educated at the Jan III Sobieski High School in Kraków and between 1906 and 1910 continued his studies in Munich, Berlin and Paris. After finishing his education, Morstin was, between 1911 and 1913, the co-editor of monthly Museion paper. During the First World War he served in the 2nd Infantry Regiment of the Polish Legions and ended the war with the rank of major. As a result of his services to the Austro-Hungarian Empire he received the title of Count from Franz Joseph I on 29 July 1915.

Immediately after the war Morstin served in the Regency Council as well as on diplomatic missions to Paris (1919–1922) and Rome (1922–1924). Between 1930 and 1931 he was the editor of the monthly Pamiętnik Warszawski.

Following the outbreak of the Second World War there were, however, doubts in both German and Polish camps as to where the Morstin's loyalty lay due to their German origins. In 1943, Morstin replied to a German government letter questioning his German background that he was "a Pole and had no German roots". Morstin used his outhouses and estate to hide Jews fleeing from Nazi death squads, an action for which he would have surely been executed by the Nazi Regime. Furthermore, he used the Pławowice Palace to hold meetings with the Polish Underground Army (Armia Krajowa). Stories have been told of Germans being billeted in the servants' quarters on the ground floor while leaders of the Polish Resistance held secret meetings on the floor above.

When the Second World War ended in 1945 Morstin donated the Palace of Pławowice, park and his personal library to the Circle of Polish Writers. After a period of poor management and lack of financial acumen the Government took over the estate, exported the library to Warsaw and housed peasant families within the palace itself. Two stone lions were removed from the estate in 1966 and can now be seen in front of the Kraków Ratusz Tower. The new tenants used the wooden flooring and furniture for fire wood as well as moving their livestock into the palace. After 53 years of management by the Polish People's Republic the palace and the park was devastated and left in ruins.

Ludwik had moved to Zakopane where he founded the Society of Amateur Theatre named after Helena Modrzejewska. He took an active part in theatre and literature in Kraków and Katowice. In 1960 he moved to Warsaw where he lived till his death on 12 May 1966.

== Honours and awards ==
In his lifetime Morstin was awarded the Order of Polonia Restituta (1923) and the Złotym Wawrzynem Polskiej Akademii Literatury (1936) by the Government of the Second Polish Republic, the Légion d'honneur, Officier, by the French Republic as well as the Commander's Cross of Polonia Restituta (1953) and the Order of the Banner of Labour, I Class (1963) by the Communist People's Republic of Poland.
