= Pławowice =

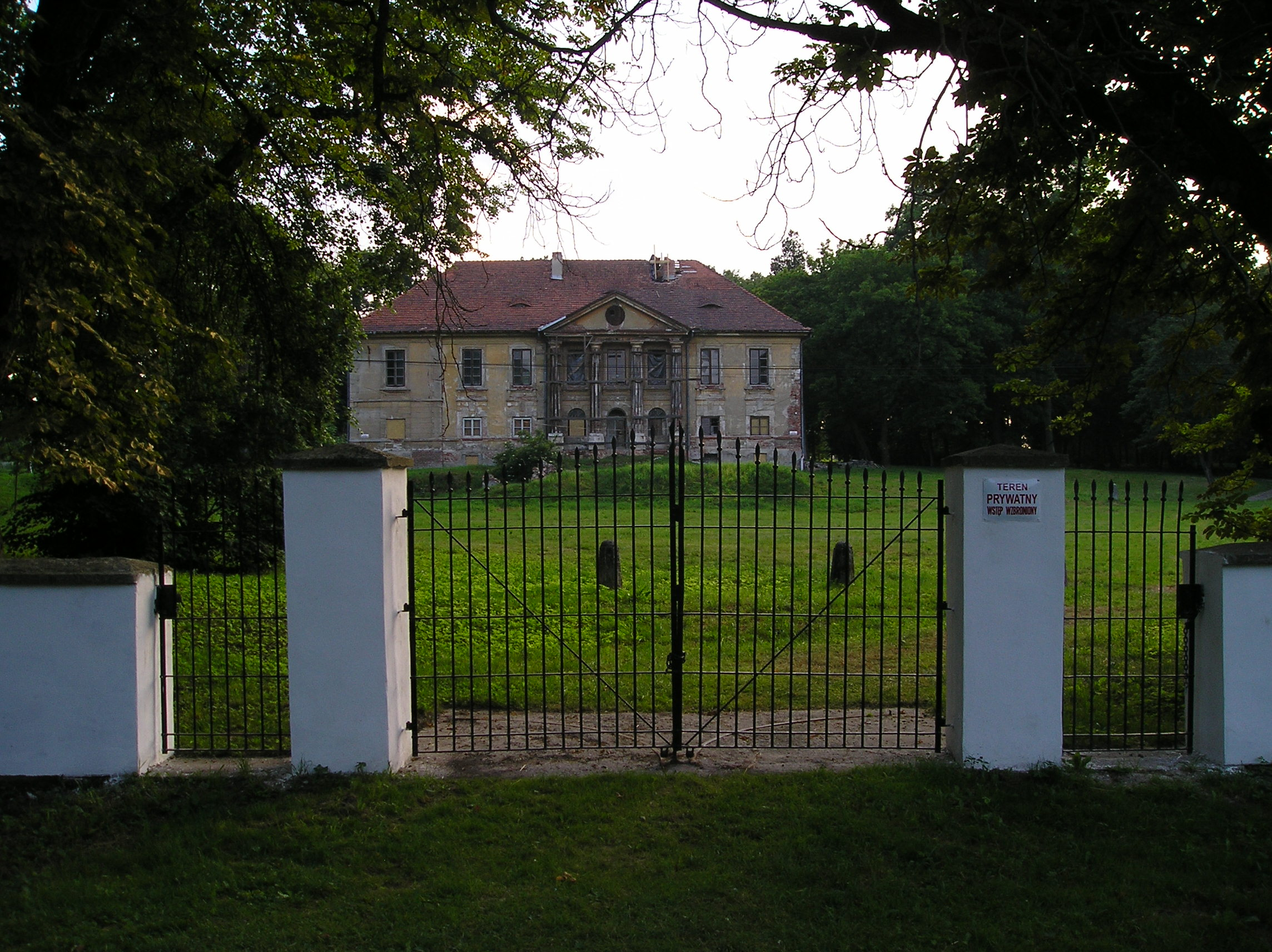
- Manor house in 2006

- Location within Poland
- Coordinates: 50°11′N 20°25′E
- Country: Poland
- Voivodeship: Lesser Poland
- County: Proszowice
- Gmina: Nowe Brzesko
- Time zone: UTC+1 (CET)
  - Summer (DST): UTC+2 (CEST)
- Area code: +48 12
- Car plates: KPR

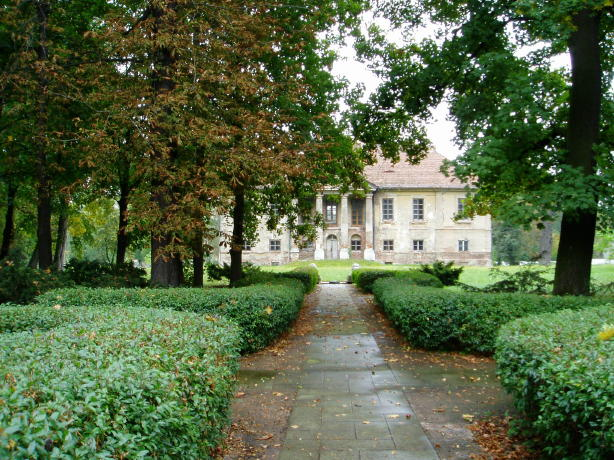
Pławowice in 2004

Pławowice [pwavɔˈvit͡sɛ] is a hamlet in the Voivodeship of Małopolska and the County of Proszowice.

== Notable people ==
- Ludwik Hieronim Morstin
- Marian Bronisław Tomaszewski.
