= Radziejowice =

- Village
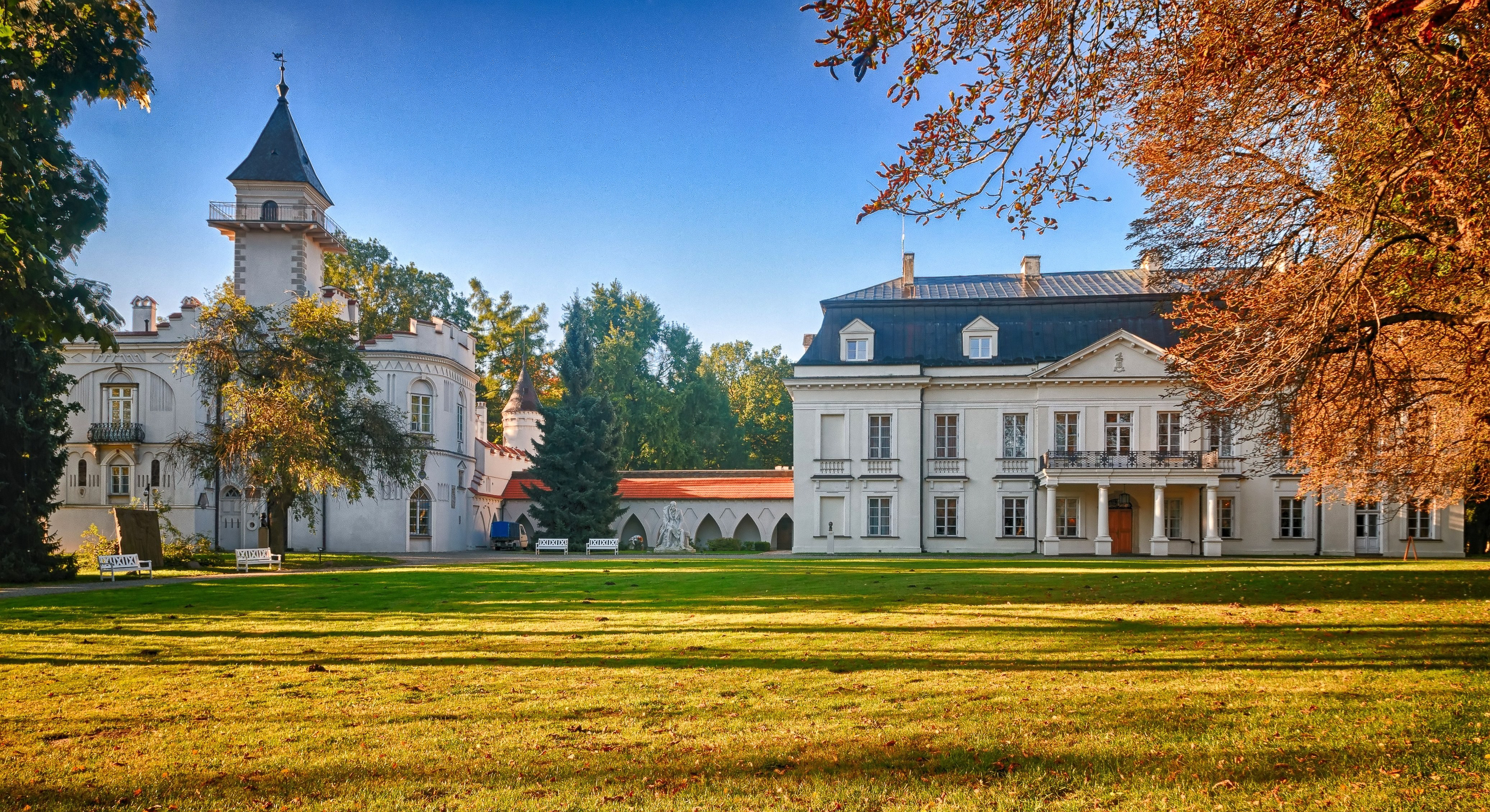
- Radziejowice Castle and Palace

- Location within Poland
- Coordinates: 52°0′N 20°33′E
- Country: Poland
- Voivodeship: Masovian
- County: Żyrardów
- Gmina: Radziejowice
- Time zone: UTC+1 (CET)
  - Summer (DST): UTC+2 (CEST)
- Postal code: 96-325
- Vehicle registration: WZY

Radziejowice ([rad͡ʑɛjɔˈvit͡sɛ]) is a village in Żyrardów County, Masovian Voivodeship, in east-central Poland. It is the seat of the gmina (administrative district) called Gmina Radziejowice.

== History ==
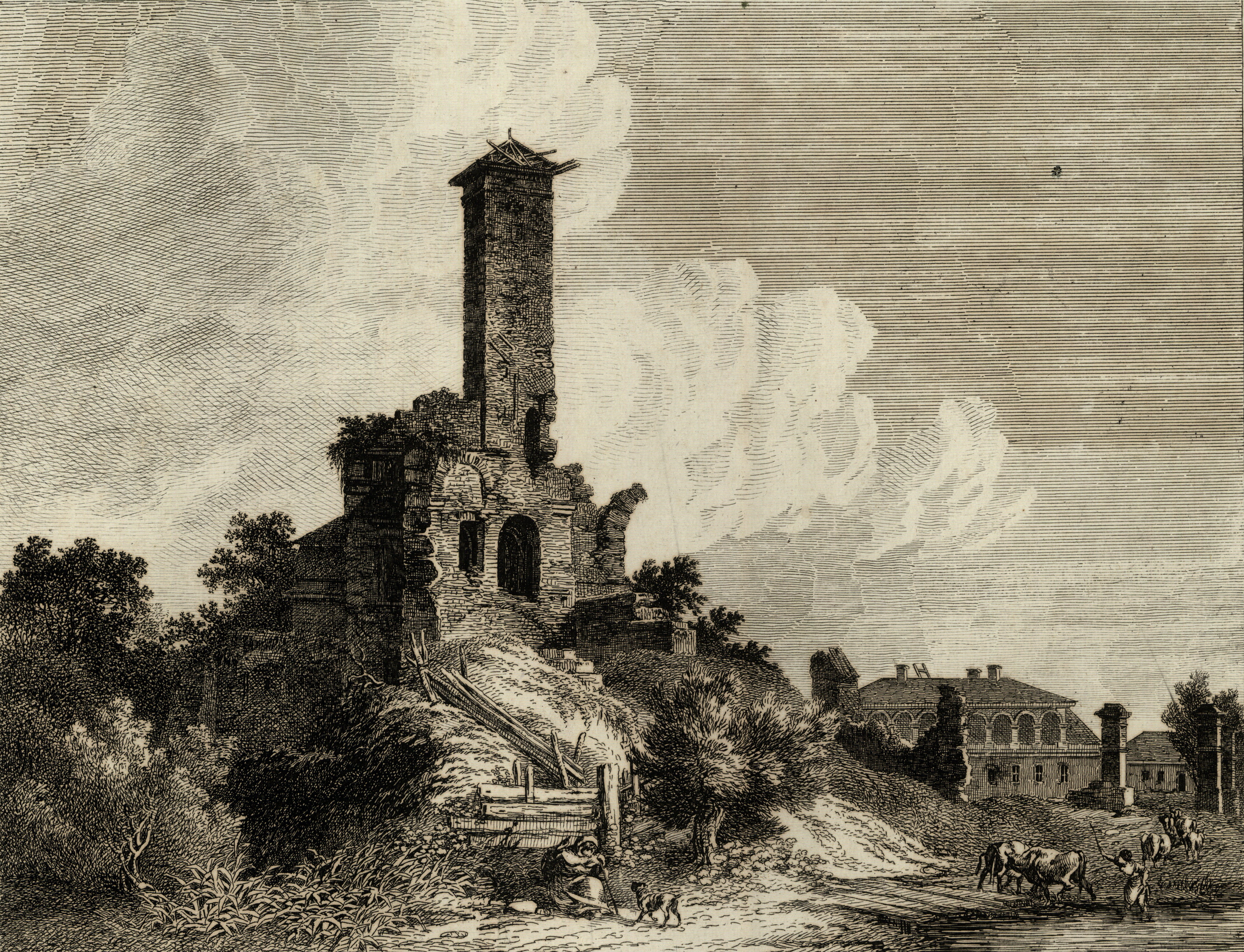
19th-century view of the old tower

Radziejowice was the seat of the Radziejowski noble family, which gained considerable influence in Poland in the 17th century. Stanisław Radziejowski often hosted Polish King Sigismund III Vasa in Radziejowice, his son Hieronim Radziejowski hosted King Władysław IV Vasa in 1642, and his grandson Michał Stefan Radziejowski hosted Countess Palatine Hedwig Elisabeth of Neuburg, wife of Polish Prince James Louis Sobieski. After the death of Michał Stefan Radziejowski, it subsequently passed to the Prażmowski, Ossoliński and Krasiński families. The Krasiński family founded a Catholic parish in 1786 and built a new Neoclassical church in 1822. In 1827, the village had a population of 249.

In 1870, a brickyard was established in Radziejowice.

Following the German-Soviet invasion of Poland, which started World War II in September 1939, the village was occupied by Germany until 1945.

== Sights ==
The landmark of Radziejowice is the Radziejowice Castle, Palace and Park Complex, which additionally contains a lake, wooden manor house and busts of several famous Poles, including Fryderyk Chopin, Ignacy Jan Paderewski, Henryk Sienkiewicz, Juliusz Słowacki, Stanisław Wyspiański and Józef Chełmoński. Other sights include the Neoclassical Saint Casimir church.

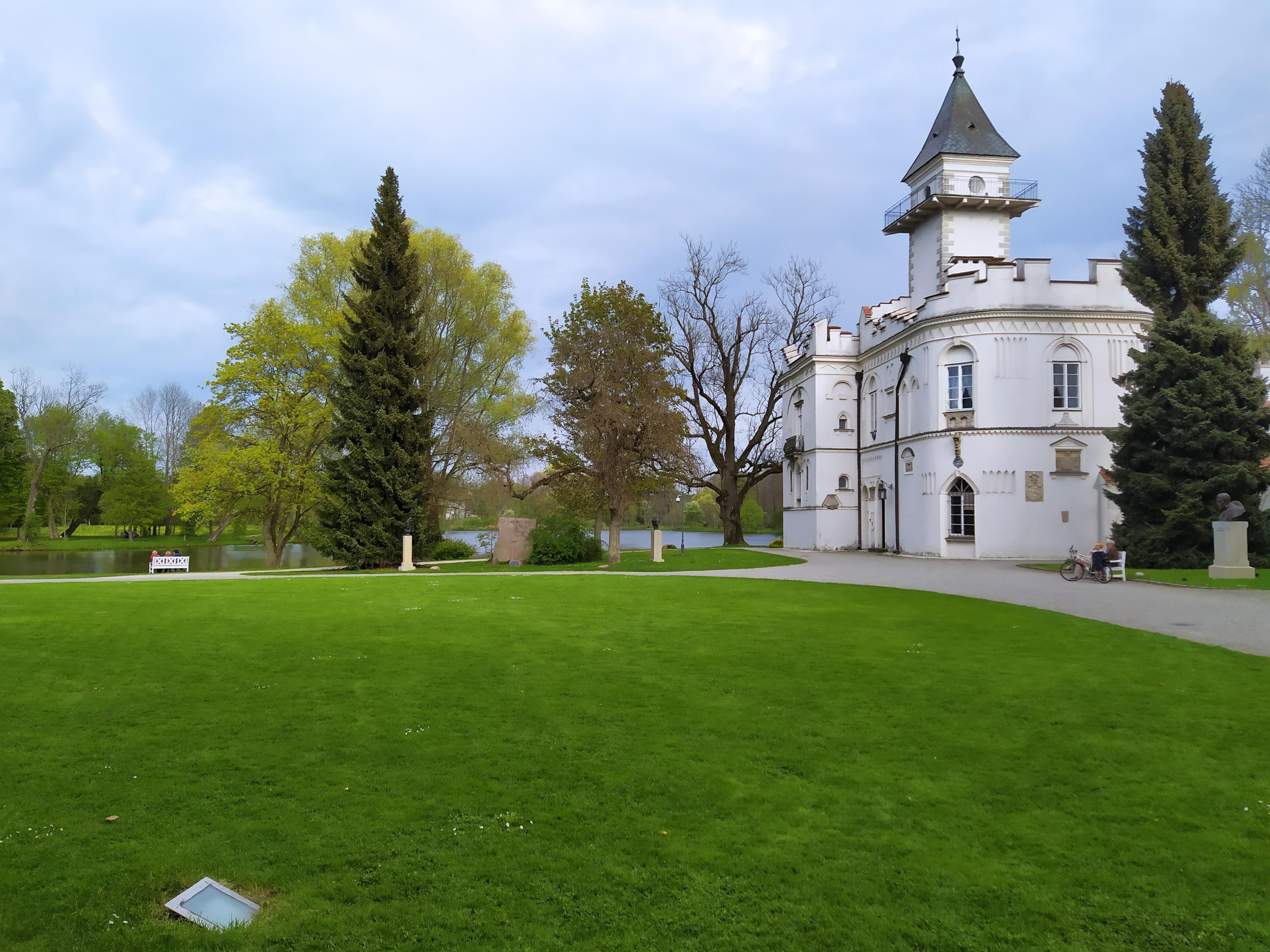
Castle and park

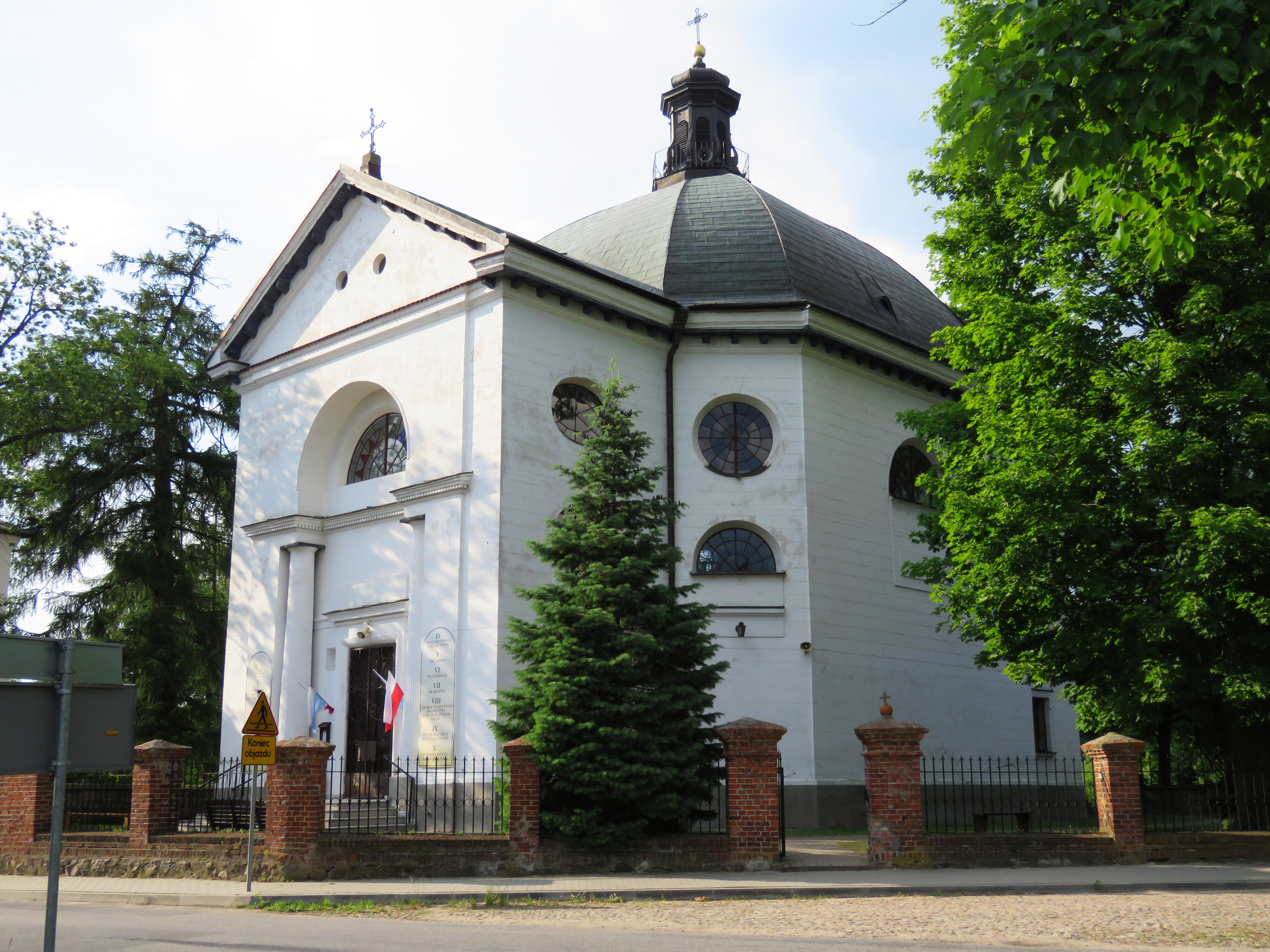
Saint Casimir church

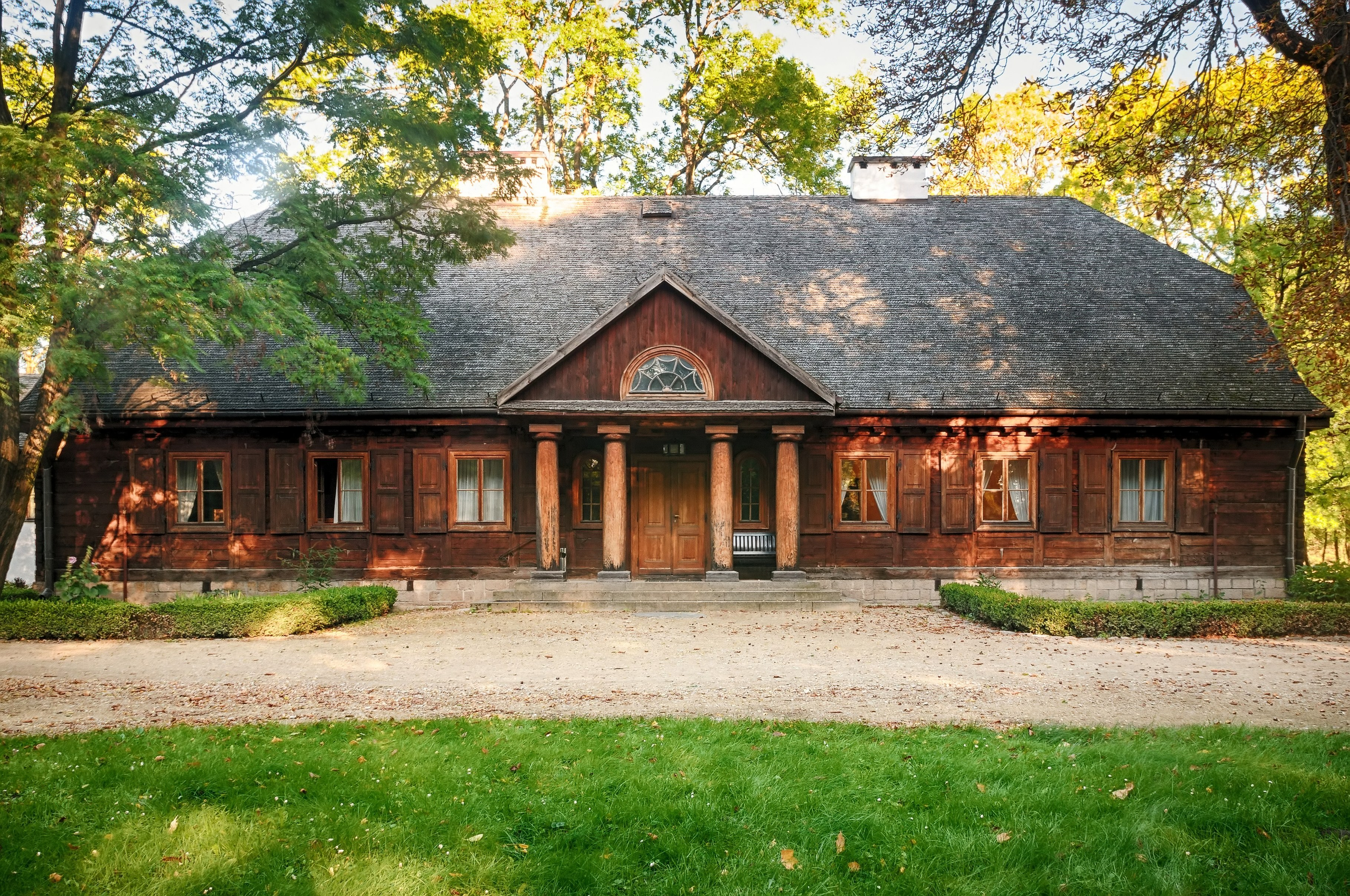
Wooden manor house

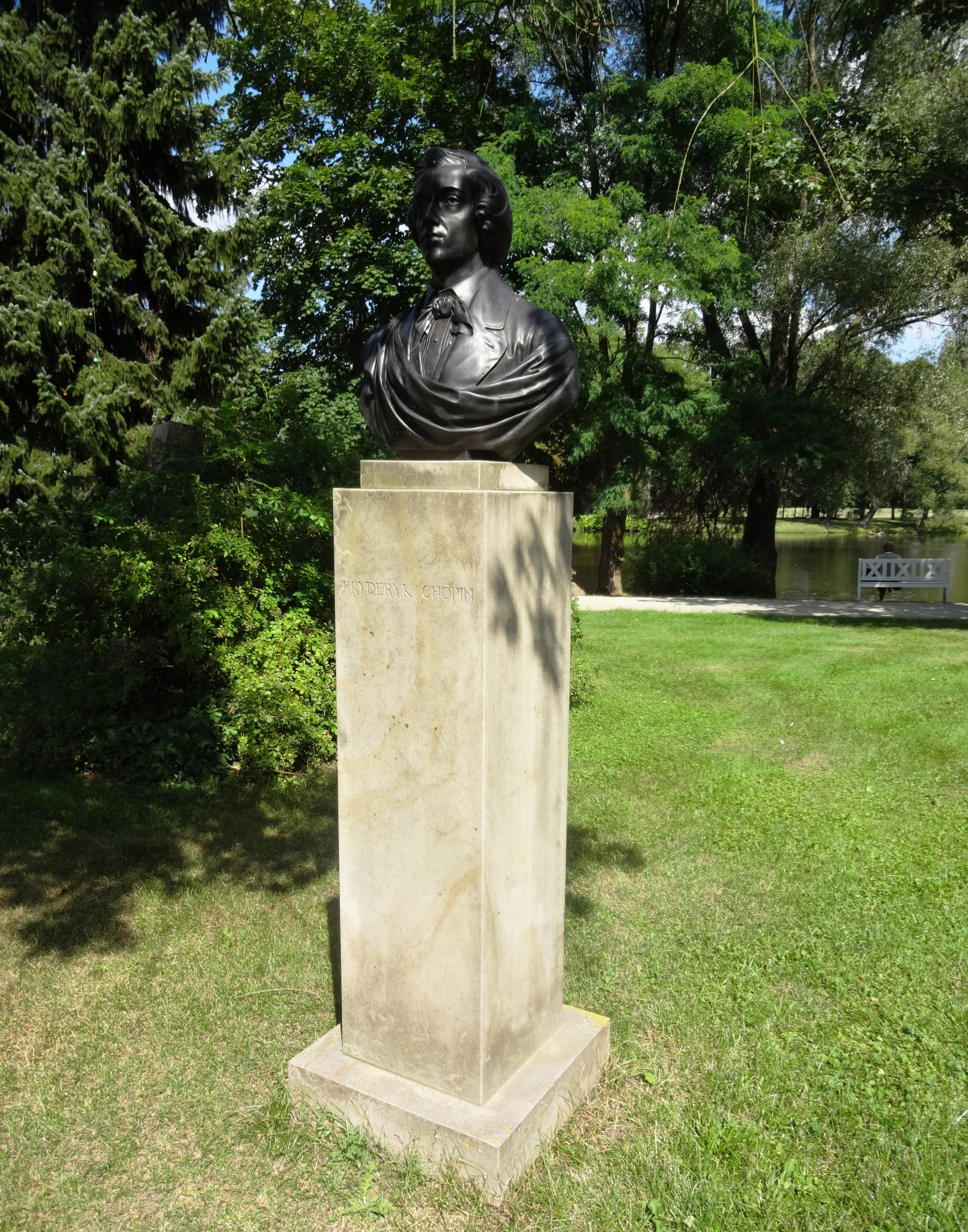
Bust of Fryderyk Chopin
