= Radziejowski =

Radziejowski is a surname. Notable people with the surname include:

- Hieronim Radziejowski (1612–1667), exile who led the Swedish to Poland
- Lucyna Radziejowska (1899–1944), Polish teacher known for lending aid to Jews during World War II
- Michał Stefan Radziejowski (1645–1705), cardinal
- Stanisław Radziejowski (1575–1637), politician

== See also ==
- Radziejów County (Polish: powiat radziejowski)
