= Zazdrość =

Zazdrość may refer to the following places:

== Places ==
- Zazdrość, Nakło County in Kuyavian-Pomeranian Voivodeship (north-central Poland)
- Zazdrość, Wyszków County in Masovian Voivodeship (east-central Poland)
- Zazdrość, Żyrardów County in Masovian Voivodeship (east-central Poland)
- Zazdrość, Iława County in Warmian-Masurian Voivodeship (north Poland)
- Zazdrość, Gmina Biskupiec in Warmian-Masurian Voivodeship (north Poland)
- Zazdrość, Gmina Stawiguda in Warmian-Masurian Voivodeship (north Poland)
- Zazdrość, Szczytno County in Warmian-Masurian Voivodeship (north Poland)
- Zazdrość, Orzesze in Silesian Voivodeship (south Poland)
- Zazdrość, the Polish name for Zazdrist, Ternopil oblast, Ukraine

== Other ==
- Zazdrość (film), a 1922 Polish silent film
