= Podlasie (disambiguation) =

Podlasie is a region in north-east Poland.

Podlasie may also refer to the following villages in Poland:

- Podlasie, Garwolin County
- Podlasie, Płock County
- Podlasie, Żyrardów County
- Podlasie, Warmian-Masurian Voivodeship
