= Korytów =

Korytów may refer to the following places in Poland:

- Korytów, Kłodzko County in Lower Silesian Voivodeship (south-west Poland)
- Korytów, Polkowice County in Lower Silesian Voivodeship (south-west Poland)
- Korytów, Masovian Voivodeship (east-central Poland)
