= Korytów A =

- Village
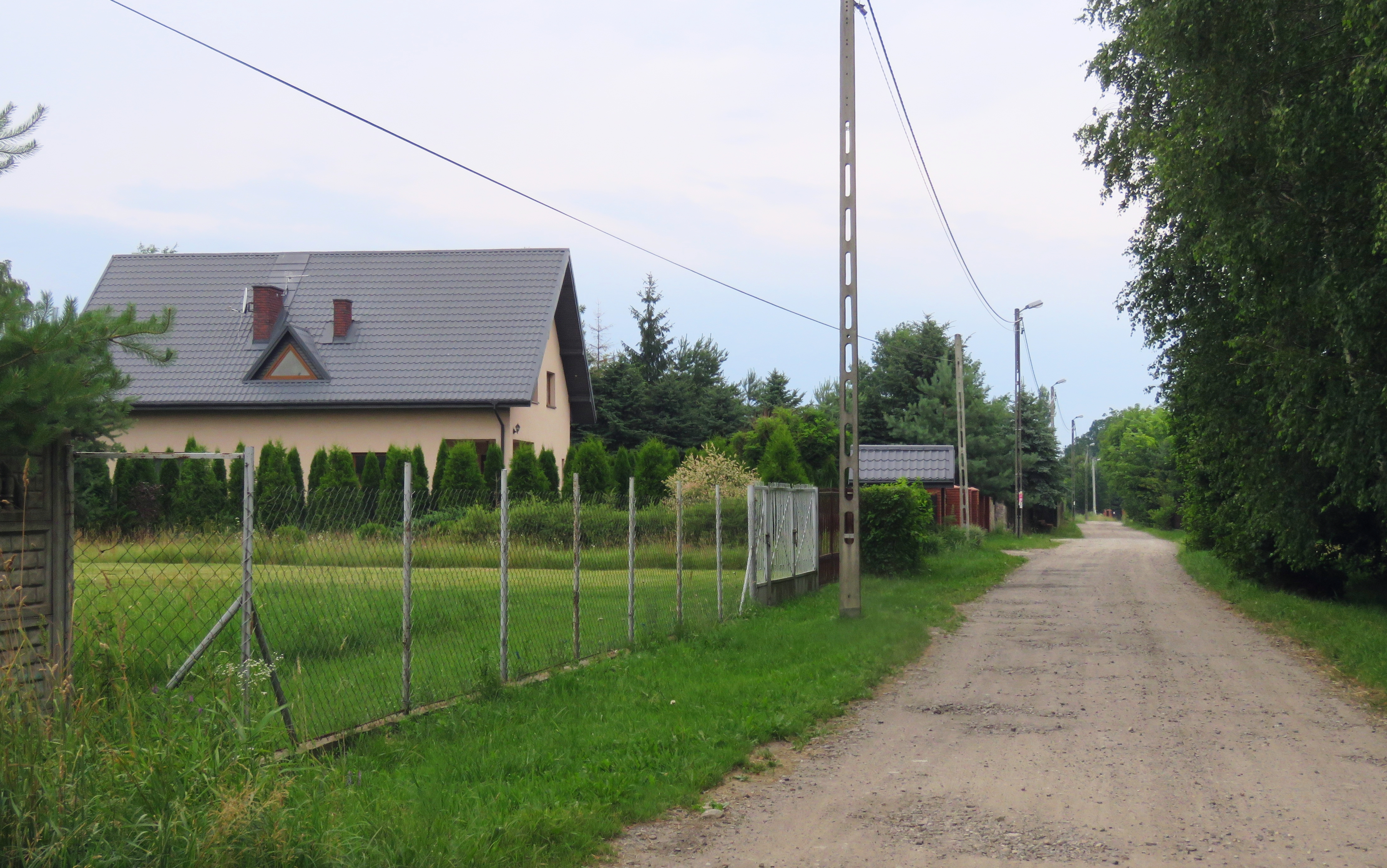

- Location within Poland
- Coordinates: 52°02′12″N 20°28′06″E
- Country: Poland
- Voivodeship: Masovian
- County: Żyrardów
- Gmina: Radziejowice

Korytów A is a village in the administrative district of Gmina Radziejowice, within Żyrardów County, Masovian Voivodeship, in east-central Poland.
