= Kamionka, Gmina Radziejowice =

Kamionka
- Village
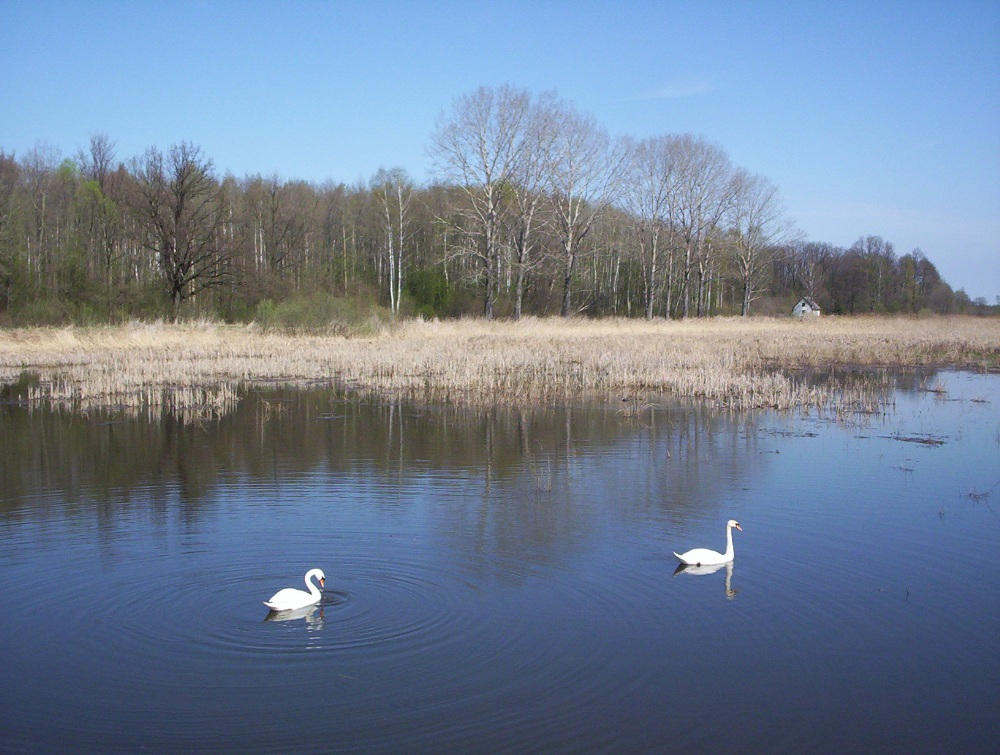
- Pond in Kamionka

- Location within Poland
- Coordinates: 51°59′04″N 20°35′22″E
- Country: Poland
- Voivodeship: Masovian
- County: Żyrardów
- Gmina: Radziejowice

Kamionka [kaˈmjɔnka] is a village in the administrative district of Gmina Radziejowice, within Żyrardów County, Masovian Voivodeship, in east-central Poland.
