= Kuklówka Radziejowicka =

- Village
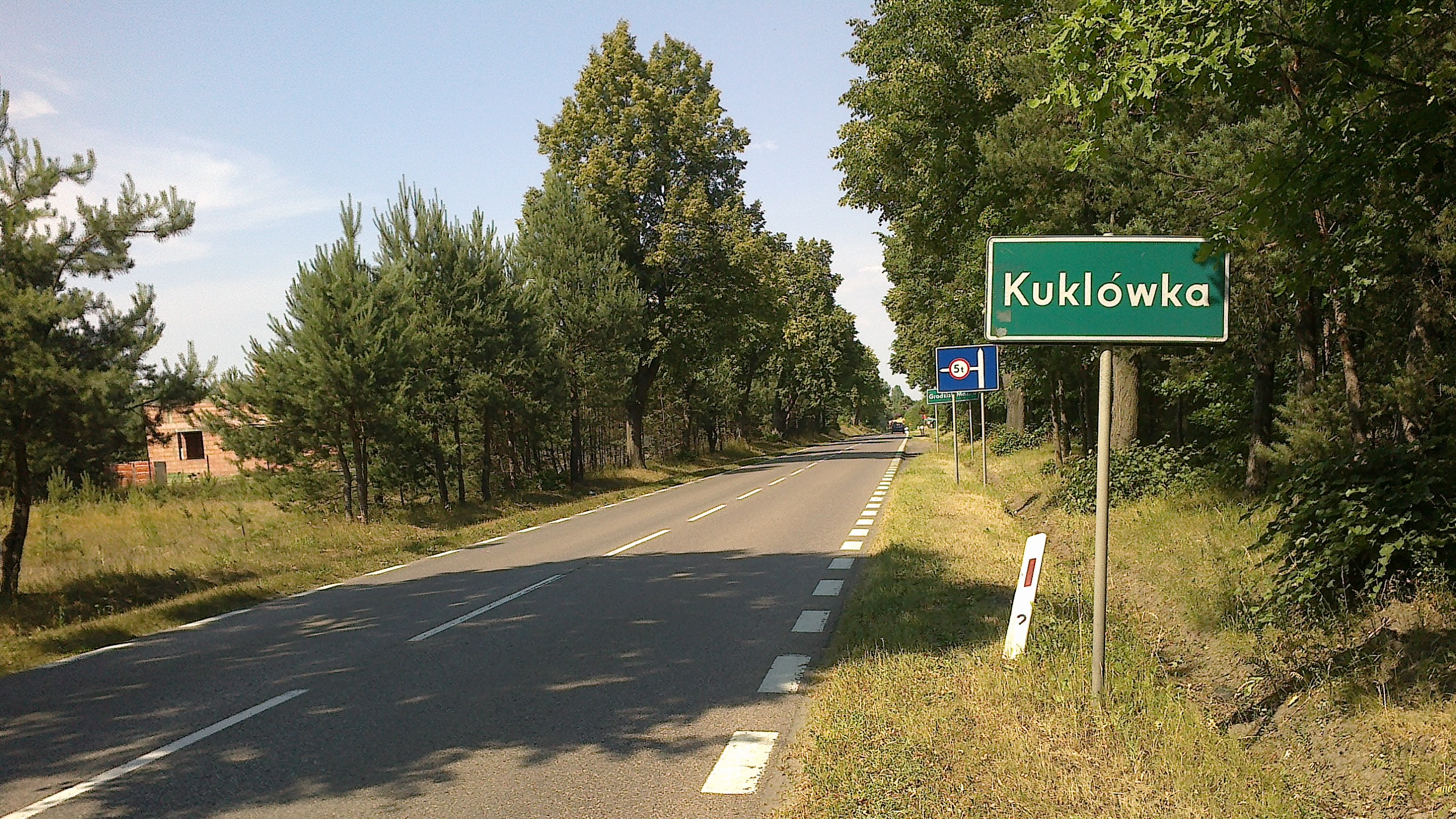
- Kuklówka Radziejowicka

- Location within Poland
- Coordinates: 52°02′37″N 20°35′26″E
- Country: Poland
- Voivodeship: Masovian
- County: Żyrardów
- Gmina: Radziejowice

Kuklówka Radziejowicka [kuˈklufka rad͡ʑɛjɔˈvit͡ska] is a village in the administrative district of Gmina Radziejowice, within Żyrardów County, Masovian Voivodeship, in east-central Poland.
