= Pieńki-Towarzystwo =

- Village
- Location within Poland
- Coordinates: 52°00′31″N 20°27′40″E
- Country: Poland
- Voivodeship: Masovian
- County: Żyrardów
- Gmina: Radziejowice

Pieńki-Towarzystwo [ˈpjɛɲki tɔvaˈʐɨstfɔ] is a village in the administrative district of Gmina Radziejowice, within Żyrardów County, Masovian Voivodeship, in east-central Poland.
