= Adamów, Żyrardów County =

Adamów
- Village
- Location within Poland
- Coordinates: 52°1′N 20°34′E
- Country: Poland
- Voivodeship: Masovian
- County: Żyrardów
- Gmina: Radziejowice
- Population: 150

Adamów [aˈdamuf] is a village in the administrative district of Gmina Radziejowice, within Żyrardów County, Masovian Voivodeship, located in east-central Poland.
