= Krzyżówka, Masovian Voivodeship =

Krzyżówka
- Village
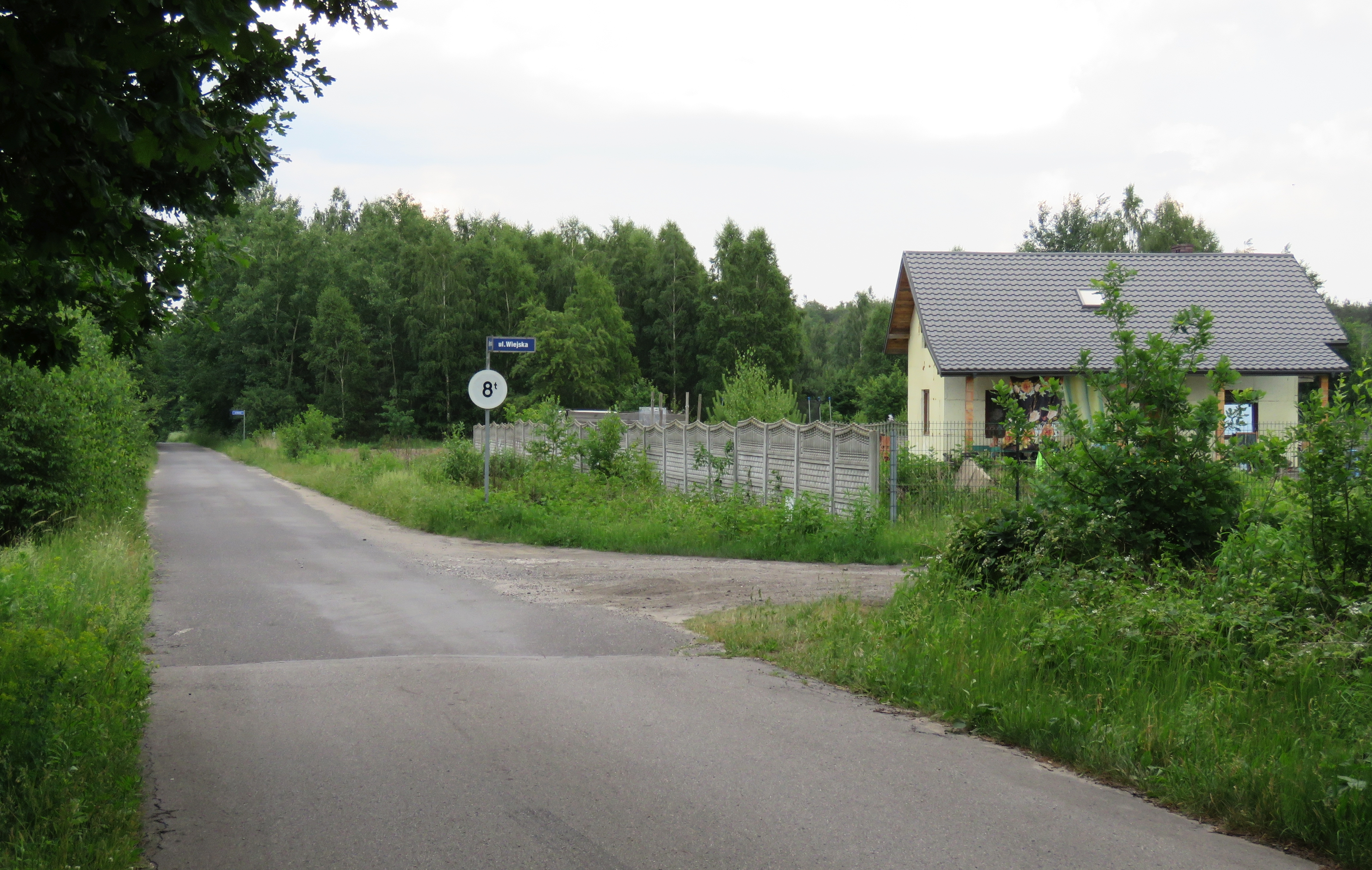
- House by the roadside of Krzyżówka

- Location within Poland
- Coordinates: 52°00′21″N 20°28′49″E
- Country: Poland
- Voivodeship: Masovian
- County: Żyrardów
- Gmina: Radziejowice

Krzyżówka [kʂɨˈʐufka] is a village in the administrative district of Gmina Radziejowice, within Żyrardów County, Masovian Voivodeship, in east-central Poland.
