= Zboiska, Masovian Voivodeship =

Zboiska
- Village
- Location within Poland
- Coordinates: 51°59′N 20°35′E
- Country: Poland
- Voivodeship: Masovian
- County: Żyrardów
- Gmina: Radziejowice

Zboiska [ˈzbɔi̯ska] is a village in the administrative district of Gmina Radziejowice, within Żyrardów County, Masovian Voivodeship, in east-central Poland.
