= Stare Budy Radziejowskie =

- Village
- Location within Poland
- Coordinates: 52°02′47″N 20°32′13″E
- Country: Poland
- Voivodeship: Masovian
- County: Żyrardów
- Gmina: Radziejowice

Stare Budy Radziejowskie [ˈstarɛ ˈbudɨ rad͡ʑɛˈjɔfskʲɛ] is a village in the administrative district of Gmina Radziejowice, within Żyrardów County, Masovian Voivodeship, in east-central Poland.
