= Tartak Brzózki =

- Village
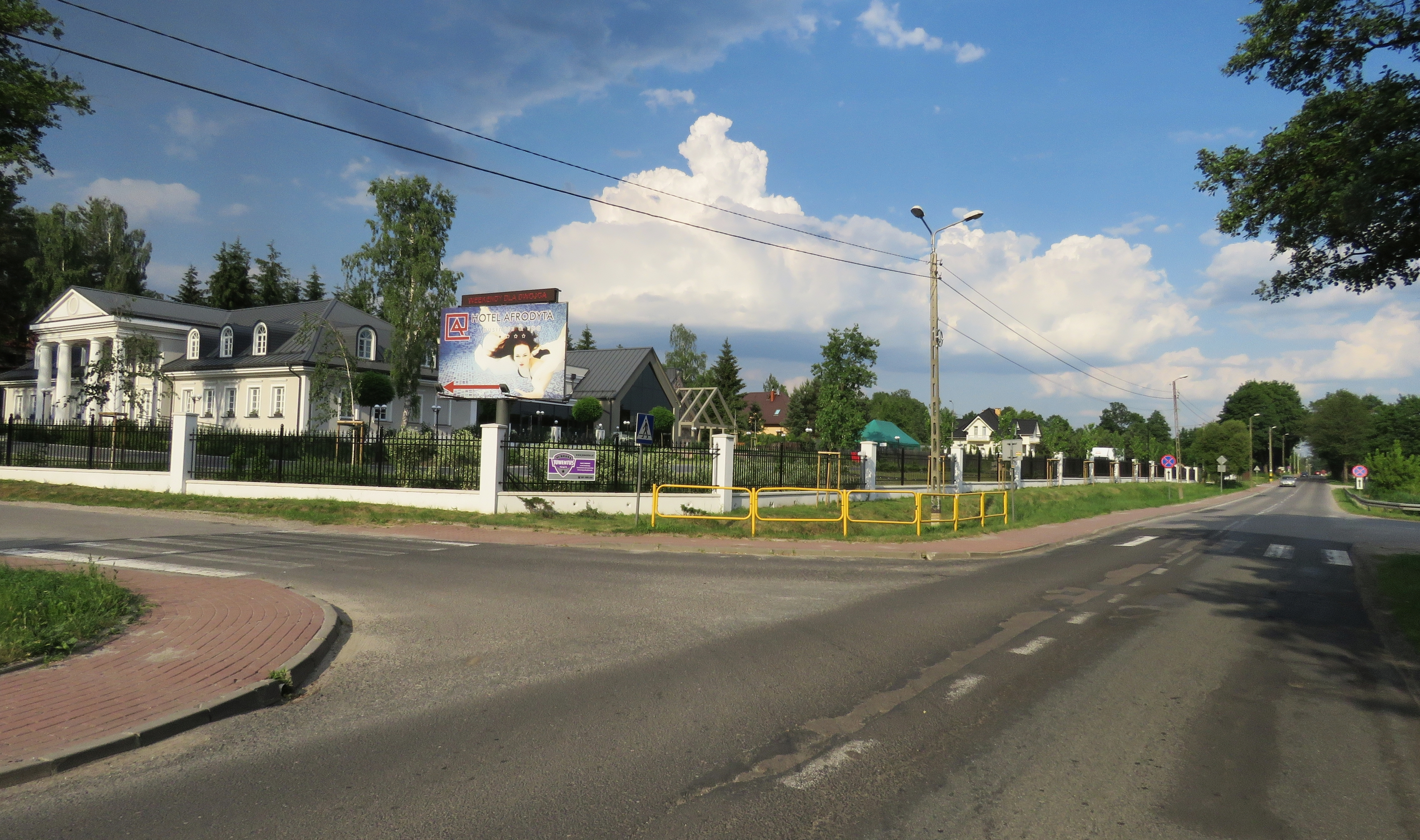
- Tartak Brzózki

- Location within Poland
- Coordinates: 52°00′37″N 20°31′56″E
- Country: Poland
- Voivodeship: Masovian
- County: Żyrardów
- Gmina: Radziejowice

Tartak Brzózki [ˈtartak ˈbʐuski] is a village in the administrative district of Gmina Radziejowice, within Żyrardów County, Masovian Voivodeship, in east-central Poland.
