= Radziejowice-Parcel =

- Village
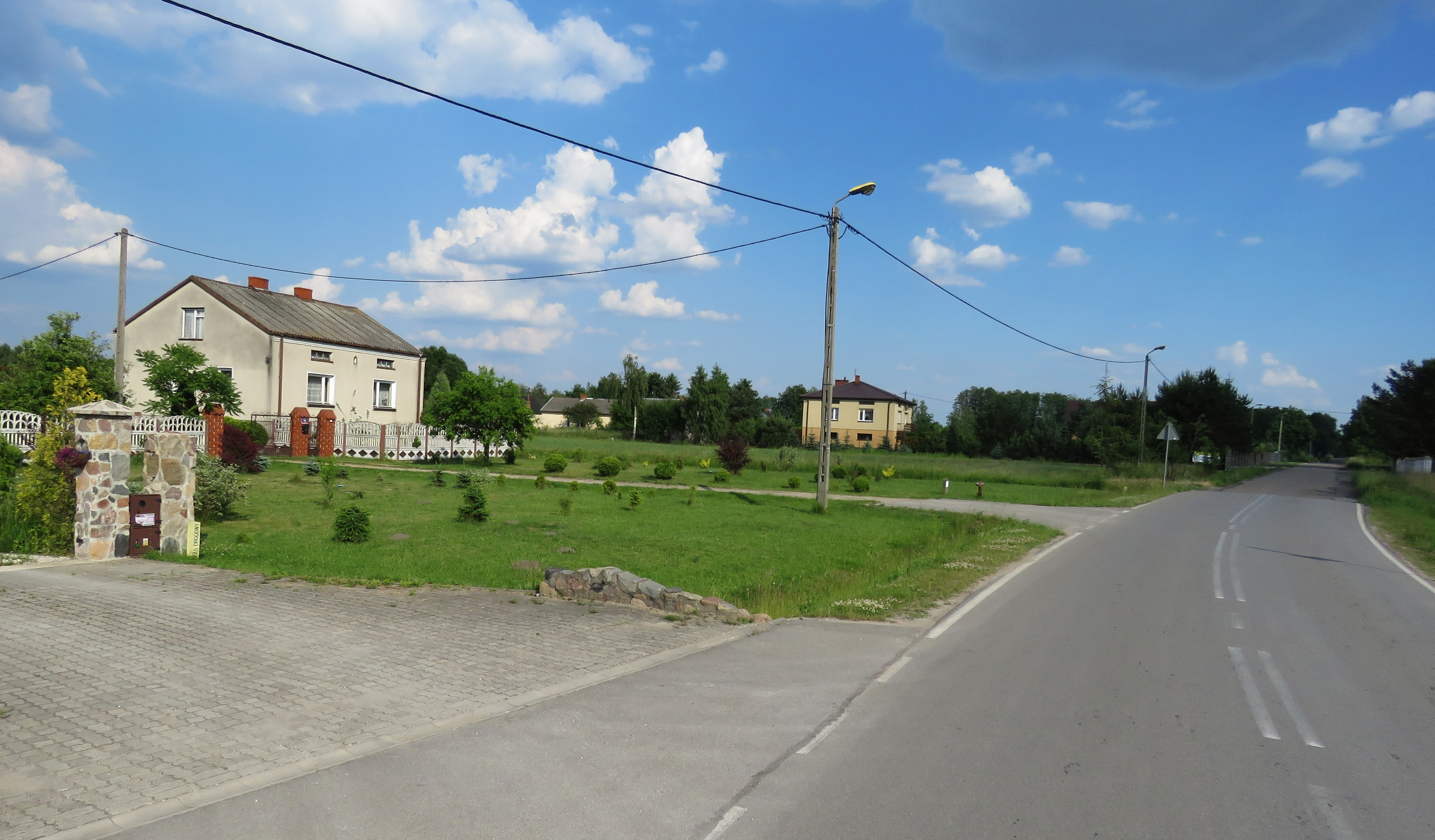

- Location within Poland
- Coordinates: 51°59′43″N 20°33′03″E
- Country: Poland
- Voivodeship: Masovian
- County: Żyrardów
- Gmina: Radziejowice

Radziejowice-Parcel [rad͡ʑɛjɔˈvit͡sɛ ˈpart͡sɛl] is a village in the administrative district of Gmina Radziejowice, within Żyrardów County, Masovian Voivodeship, in east-central Poland.
