= Budy Mszczonowskie =

- Village
- Location within Poland
- Coordinates: 52°0′N 20°32′E
- Country: Poland
- Voivodeship: Masovian
- County: Żyrardów
- Gmina: Radziejowice

Budy Mszczonowskie [ˈbudɨ mʂt͡ʂɔˈnɔfskʲɛ] is a village in the administrative district of Gmina Radziejowice, within Żyrardów County, Masovian Voivodeship, in east-central Poland.
