= Adamów-Parcel =

- Village
- Location within Poland
- Coordinates: 52°1′8″N 20°34′23″E
- Country: Poland
- Voivodeship: Masovian
- County: Żyrardów
- Gmina: Radziejowice
- Population: 60

Adamów-Parcel [aˈdamuf ˈpart͡sɛl] is a village in the administrative district of Gmina Radziejowice, within Żyrardów County, Masovian Voivodeship, in east-central Poland.
