= Radziejowice Castle =

Radziejowice Castle and Palace-Park Complex
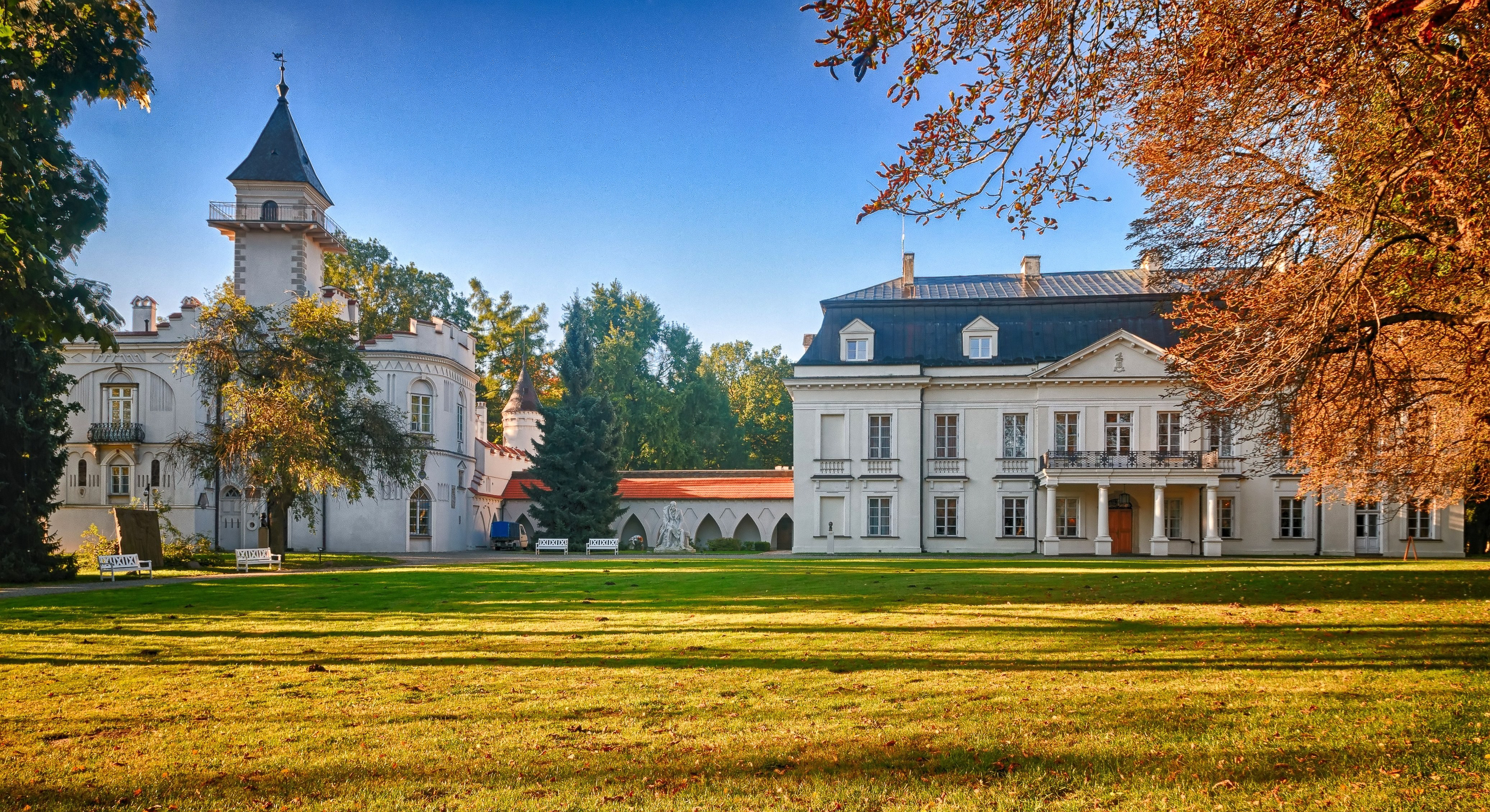
- Radziejowice Castle and Palace-Park Complex

- Location of the Radziejowice Castle and Palace-Park Complex in Poland
- 52°00′13″N 20°33′03″E
- Location: Radziejowice, Masovian Voivodeship in Poland

History
- Built: 15th century

Site notes
- Architectural style: Classical

Radziejowice Castle is a complex of Classical residences surrounded by a park, located in the village of Radziejowice, Żyrardów Powiat, Masovian Voivodeship in Poland. Since 1965 the complex has functioned as a cultural centre, particularly as a space to exhibit fine arts. The palace houses a museum and an exhibition space.

== History ==
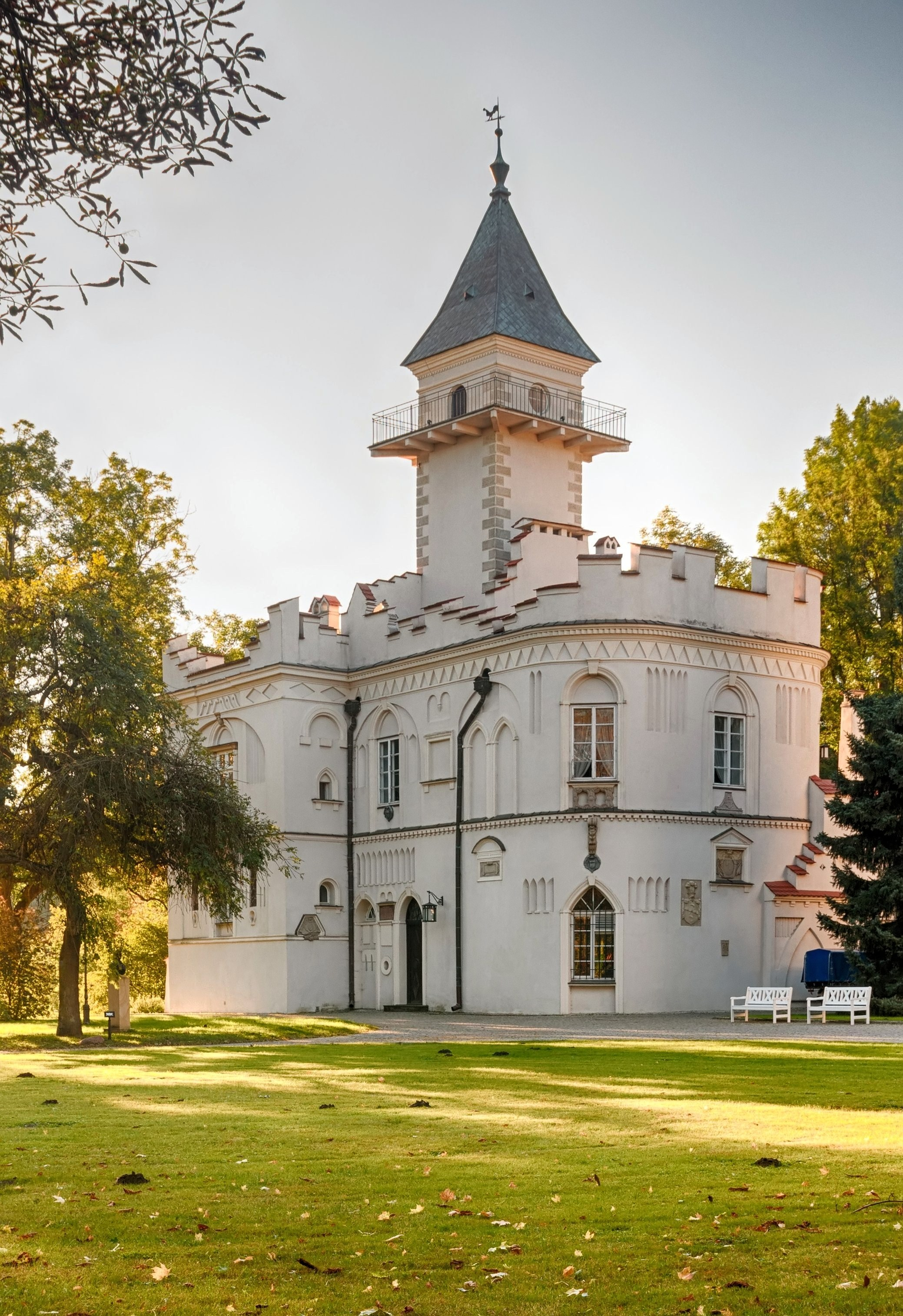
The Neo-Gothic Radziejowice Castle

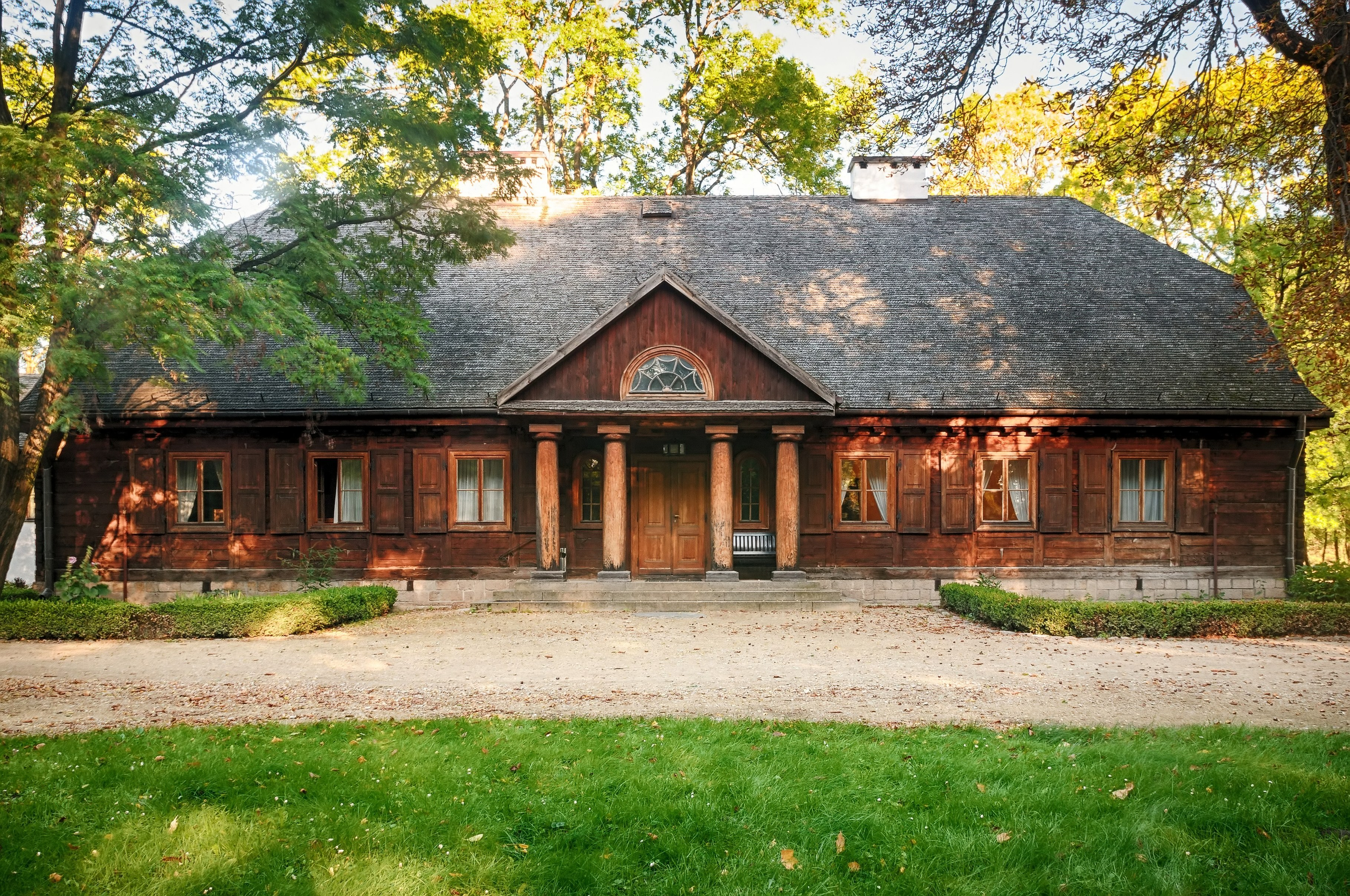
Manor House in the Radziejowice Castle Complex

The location of the palace was already the site of a Radziejowski family residence in the 15th century. During the 17th century, the palace, after various expansions and modernisations, took on the Gothic architectural style, as did the other buildings in the complex. During the complex's heyday, the palace was a residence for multiple Kings of the Polish–Lithuanian Commonwealth: Zygmund III Waza, Władysław IV, and Jan III Sobieski.

The current appearance of the complex was largely created during the turning point of the 18th and 19th centuries, after Kazimierz Krasiński's reconstruction of the complex, designed and by Jakub Kubicki. The expansion of the complex was later continued by Józef Wawrzyniec Krasiński, who had built the surrounding landscape park and the small Neo-Gothic castle. During the next several decades, the Radziejowski family was visited by people of culture such as Juliusz Kossak, Henryk Sienkiewicz, Lucjan Rydel, Jarosław Iwaszkiewicz, Józef Chełmoński and Stanisław Masłowski.

The castle and complex were devastated during World War II, but the Ministry of Culture and National Heritage has thoroughly restored the site to its former beauty. Currently, the castle and the complex are visited by writers, columnists, actors, film-makers, musicians and visual artists. Among notable visitors was Jerzy Waldorff.

== See also ==
- Architecture of Poland
- List of palaces in Poland
