= Nowe Budy, Żyrardów County =

Nowe Budy
- Village
- Location within Poland
- Coordinates: 52°01′56″N 20°33′08″E
- Country: Poland
- Voivodeship: Masovian
- County: Żyrardów
- Gmina: Radziejowice

Nowe Budy [ˈnɔvɛ ˈbudɨ] is a village in the administrative district of Gmina Radziejowice, within Żyrardów County, Masovian Voivodeship, in east-central Poland.
