= Gmina Radziejowice =

Gmina Radziejowice Radziejowice Commune
- Gmina
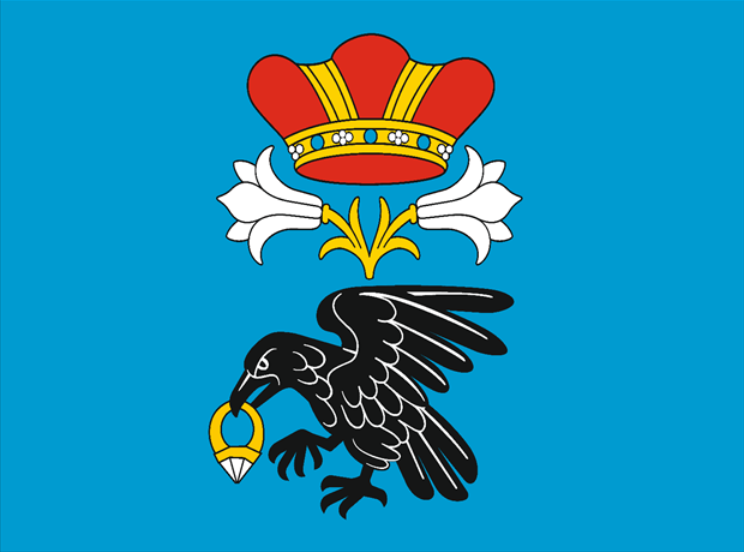
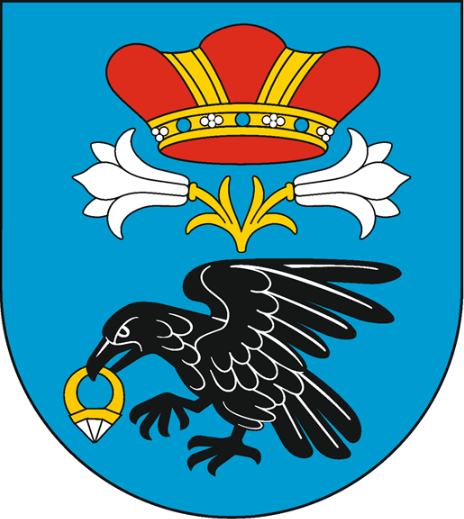
- Flag Coat of arms
- Interactive map of Gmina Radziejowice
- Coordinates (Radziejowice): 52°0′N 20°33′E
- Country: Poland
- Voivodeship: Masovian
- County: Żyrardów
- Seat: Radziejowice

Area
  - Total: 80.06 km^{2} (30.91 sq mi)

Population (2006)
  - Total: 4,616
  - Density: 57.66/km^{2} (149.3/sq mi)
- Website: http://www.radziejowice.pl/

Gmina Radziejowice is a rural gmina (administrative district) in Żyrardów County, Masovian Voivodeship, in east-central Poland. Its seat is the village of Radziejowice, which lies approximately 10 kilometres (6 mi) south-east of Żyrardów and 40 km (25 mi) south-west of Warsaw.

The gmina covers an area of 80.06 square kilometres (30.9 sq mi), and as of 2006 its total population is 4,616.

== Villages ==
Gmina Radziejowice contains the villages and settlements of Adamów, Adamów-Parcel, Benenard, Budy Józefowskie, Budy Mszczonowskie, Chroboty, Kamionka, Korytów, Korytów A, Krze Duże, Krzyżówka, Kuklówka Radziejowicka, Kuklówka Zarzeczna, Kuranów, Nowe Budy, Pieńki-Towarzystwo, Podlasie, Radziejowice, Radziejowice-Parcel, Słabomierz, Stare Budy Radziejowskie, Tartak Brzózki, Zazdrość and Zboiska.

== Neighbouring gminas ==
Gmina Radziejowice is bordered by the town of Żyrardów and by the gminas of Grodzisk Mazowiecki, Jaktorów, Mszczonów, Puszcza Mariańska, Wiskitki and Żabia Wola.
