= Zazdrość, Żyrardów County =

Zazdrość
- Village
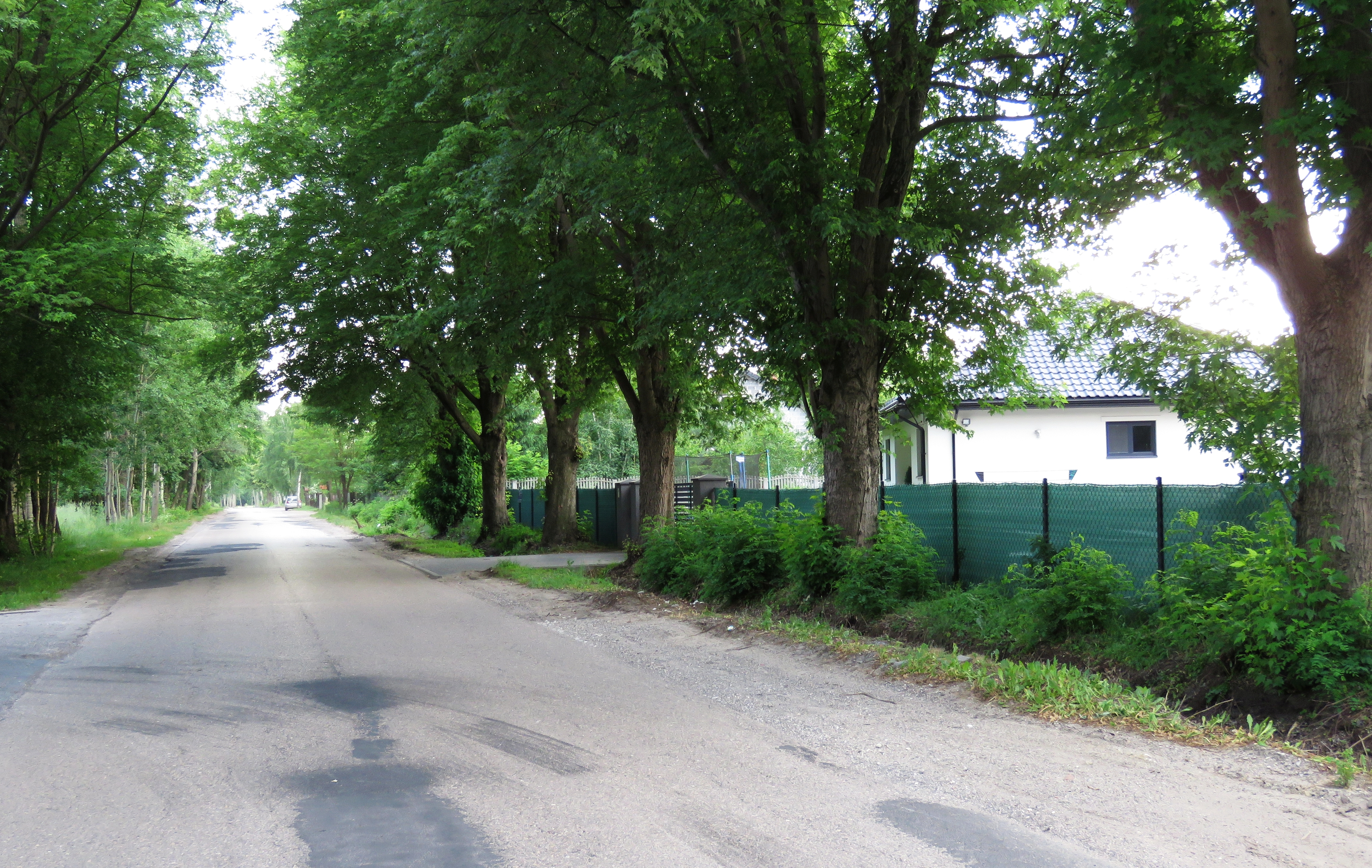

- Location within Poland
- Coordinates: 52°01′17″N 20°27′13″E
- Country: Poland
- Voivodeship: Masovian
- County: Żyrardów
- Gmina: Radziejowice

Zazdrość [ˈzazdrɔɕt͡ɕ] is a village in the administrative district of Gmina Radziejowice, within Żyrardów County, Masovian Voivodeship, in east-central Poland.
