= Hieronim Radziejowski =

Polish noble and politician

- Sejm Marshal; Deputy Chancellor of the Crown
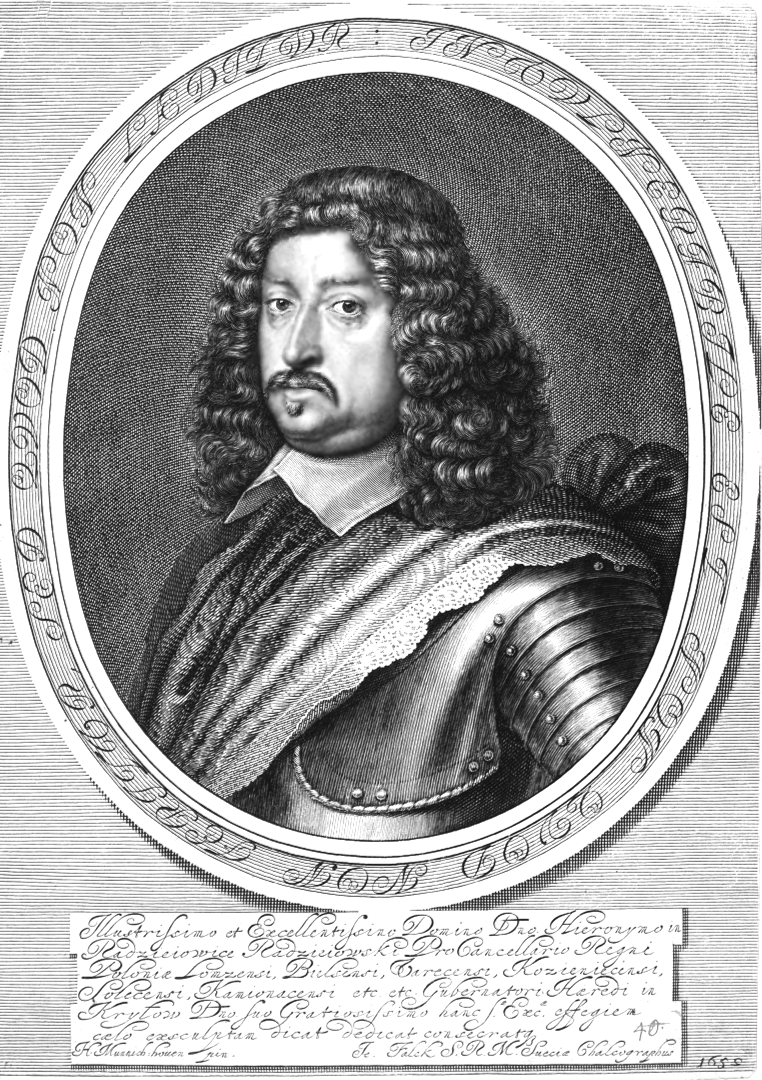
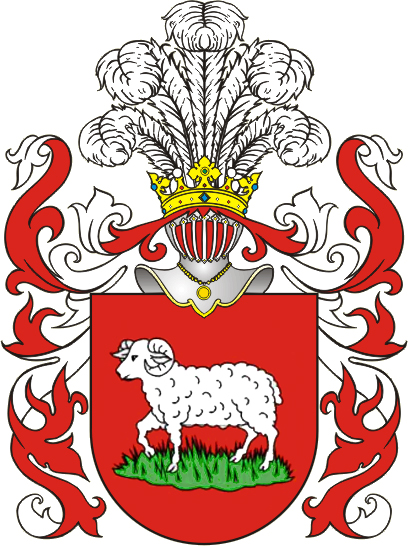
- Coat of arms: Junosza
- Born: 1612
- Died: 8 August 1667 (aged 54–55); Edirne, Ottoman Empire
- Family: Radziejowski
- Spouses: Eufrozyna Eulalja Tarnowska; Elżbieta Słuszka-Kazanowska
- Father: Stanisław Radziejowski
- Mother: Katarzyna Sobieska
- Occupation: Politician and diplomat

Hieronim Radziejowski (1612 — 8 August 1667) was a Polish noble, politician, diplomat, scholar and a military commander. He was the governor of Sochaczew since 1643 and Vice-Chancellor of the Crown between 1650 and 1652. He also served as Marshal of the Sejm from 13 February to 27 March 1645 in Warsaw.

He came into conflict with King John II Casimir when he found out that his wife, Elżbieta Słuszka was the King's mistress. Radziejowski started to conspire against the King with the enemies, and as a result was sentenced to infamy and banishment (exile) in 1652 by the Sejm Tribunal. He left Poland for Sweden, and convinced the Swedish to attack the Commonwealth. In 1655, Radziejowski accompanied the Swedish forces during their invasion of Poland in the course of The Deluge. He played an important role in persuading the militia (pospolite ruszenie) to surrender at Ujście. In 1662 he was pardoned by the Sejm. In 1667 he went on a diplomatic mission to the Ottoman Empire and died there.

He was the father of Michał Stefan Radziejowski.

== Early political career ==
At the beginning of the seventeenth century he arrived at the court of King Władysław IV, where he quickly gained considerable influence, and most notably was appointed the starost of Sochaczew. In 1640, for the first time, he became a senator in the Sejm (parliament) despite a scandal (before the meeting of the parliament he was accused of rape). In 1645 he was appointed Speaker of the Chamber of Deputies. Afterwards, on behalf of the king, he was involved in secret negotiations with the Cossacks for their support of Poland in an expedition against the Turks. However in 1646, when the secret negotiations became public, the nobles and senators of the Sejm, opposed the campaign. At the same time Radziejowski gained influence at the court of the queen, appearing at the same parliament session to defend her royal interests. In 1648 he participated in the Battle of Piławce. Radziejowski was one of the noblemen accused of contributing to the escape of the Polish army during that battle. He then campaigned for the election of John II Casimir and supported his marriage to the widow of Władysław IV, Queen Marie Louise Gonzaga. In 1648 he was the elector of John II Casimir representing the city of Łomża. In May 1650, he married (his two previous wives died) the newly widowed Elżbieta Służka, an heir to a great fortune from her deceased husband, great magnate Adam Kazanowski. In the same year he was appointed the Vice-Chancellor of the Crown, which was accompanied by another scandal; during his speech in the parliament, while receiving the royal seal, the Grand Marshal of the Crown Prince Jerzy Sebastian Lubomirski claimed that Radziejowski bought his position and post in the government.

== Conflict with King John II Casimir ==
In 1651, during an expedition against the Cossacks, the king ordered the confiscation all belongings of Radziejowski for safe keeping. Among the most important was a letter to the Queen, in which Radziejowski heavily criticized John Casimir, for the conduct of the expedition and also suggested that the king was having an affair with his wife (who accompanied him in the expedition). After the king found out about the note, Vice-Chancellor Radziejowski was instantly and permanently removed from the Sejm. Radziejowski then, in revenge, spread rumors about the hostility of the king in relation to the nobility. However, before the Battle of Berestechko, Radziejowski reconciled with the monarch. Despite this, a conflict erupted again after the campaign. Working with Radziejowski was another nobleman, Marcin Dębicki, who headed the General Nobility Movement (the regional military council) and also accused the monarch of inept command and that the royal units allowed the Cossacks to retreat and escape during the counter-attack of the Polish army. Radziejowski himself proposed to dissolve the militia (known as pospolite ruszenie) and begin negotiations with the rebel army under the command of Bohdan Khmelnytsky, and when the council that he supported did not obey his demands, Radziejowski left the camp which led to a significant part of the nobility leaving the battlefield and not aiding the king.

== Divorce and family conflicts ==
Meanwhile, his wife, after the disclosure of the contents of the letter left the camp, requested an immediate divorce. She then became a nun in a monastery (Radziejowski later attempted to kidnap his wife from the convent, but was stopped by the royal guards), demanded the help of her brother, Bogusław Słuszka, in the removal of Radziejowski from the property where she once lived which was now occupied by him. When Radziejowski refused to leave the estate, Słuszka challenged him to a duel. Again he refused and, in the absence of the host, Słuszka stormed and captured the palace using force. Radziejowski informed of the attack gathered the nobles and on 5 January 1652 tried to recapture the palace, but didn't succeed.

== Trial and judgement ==
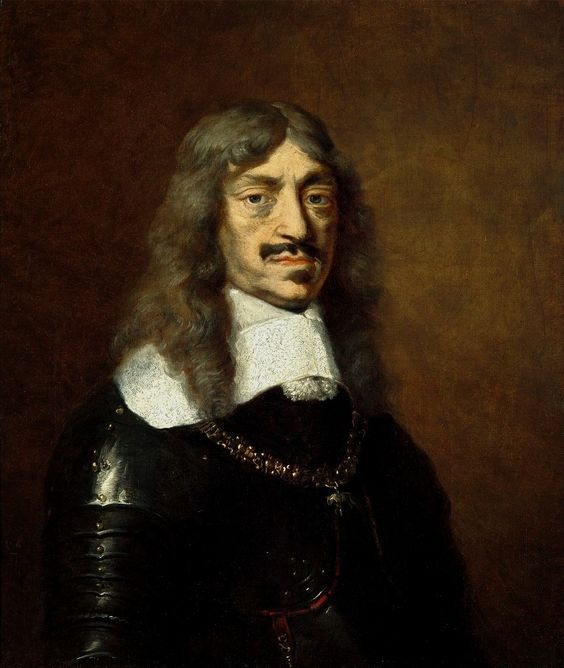
King John II Casimir of Poland

The next day Radziejowski was accused, before the court marshal, of insulting the government by his preceding actions and by breaking the law (under the term subject to any armed incident in the four weeks preceding the Sejm sitting, on the members or dignitaries of state law, however, this policy was never used before) and safety violations of a royal residence. Radziejowski successfully hid from the envoys of the king, not allowing them to provide him with a lawsuit, so that later he claimed that he was not aware of the trial; he also accused Słuszka of insulting the Crown Court in Piotrków Trybunalski. Despite his excuses and the procedural difficulties, the Crown Court sentenced Radziejowski to death. However, few days later he was pardoned by the king and instead his sentence was commuted to exile. The court in this case – in the absence of Jerzy Sebastian Lubomirski, who, as the Grand Marshal, was responsible for the protection of the king and his house but after a quarrel with Vice-Chancellor Słuszka he left the capital – was chaired by the Deputy Speaker of the court of the Crown Łukasz Opaliński, who greatly supported Radziejowski's politics and policies. Greatly unhappy with the court's decision, Opaliński held another trial, this time against Słuszka. The nobles blamed the royal court of provocation – previously Słuszka was provided the King's patronage after he saved the monarch's life, therefore he was protected by the Crown. Eventually, because the nobles and the magnates greatly supported Radziejowski, Słuszka was to be exiled and Radziejowski was to be freed. Despite this judgment, the king, furious about the nobles' and court's decision, was not going to give up. The acquisition of the letters from Radziejowski addressed to enemies like Bohdan Khmelnytsky and Ivan Vyhovsky by the king and then revealing the content of those letters eventually discredited him in the eyes of the nobility. The monarch cleverly used this technique to turn the nobles against Radziejowski, a man that they previously supported. Following this Radziejowski received letters about a planned assassination attempt on his life. He then turned to the Polish Sejm for help and protection, but the displeased nobles and the furious and insulted royal government instantly refused. Worried for his life, he fled from Poland on 15 February. Upon the return of Prince Jerzy Sebastian Lubomirski, the Sejm and the Crown Court recognized Radziejowski as a traitor and an enemy of the state.

== In Swedish service ==
After his escape, he arrived in Vienna, where he was considered a political adventurer and was denied aid. In 1652 he came to Sweden, where he was accepted into the royal Stockholm court of Queen Christina. He was the co-author of an anti-Polish alliance between Sweden, the Cossacks and Transylvania. He then went to Hamburg, where he sustained correspondence with the new King of Sweden Charles Gustav. It was in this city that Radziejowski and Charles Gustav signed a pact where they both agreed to invade Poland if the Sejm demanded Radziejowski to return to be convicted.

His position at the side of the king has never been greatly influential, however, Radziejowski skillfully tried to make an impression on the nobility and later he asked for the protection from the Swedish parliament. His knowledge of "Polish reality" and military tactics was useful and was of great importance for Charles Gustav, trying to pacify the country. But already in autumn a new political and military situation decreased the influence of Radziejowski that he had on the king, and at the same time it increased the divergence between him and the Swedish king.

In 1656 he was unexpectedly arrested in the city of Elbląg by the Swedes and was imprisoned in the castle in Malbork. At the beginning of 1657 he was prosecuted for betraying the interests of Charles Gustav and imprisoned in the castle of Örebro in Sweden. This was primarily caused by Charles Gustav's worries that Radziejowski could be a spy for Poland and especially create tensions between the two countries to cause war that would decrease Sweden's power in the region. In 1660 he was released from captivity.

== Rehabilitation, later life and death ==
After the "Deluge" (Great Northern War) in 1662, Radziejowski regained his former possessions and estates in Poland. The parliament, following some disputes, forgave him all the insults, but still claimed that the rehabilitation of honors and his titles would be to risky and cause damage to the current government. During the Lubomirski Rebellion he faithfully stood on the side of the Polish king. However, he did not fulfill the hope of regaining his former Deputy-Chancellor post. In his last years he planned to be ordained as a priest.

In 1667 Radziejowski died, probably of a contagious disease during his diplomatic mission to the Ottoman Empire.
