= Michał Stefan Radziejowski =

Polish archbishop

His Eminence Michał Stefan Radziejowski
- Cardinal, Primate of Poland
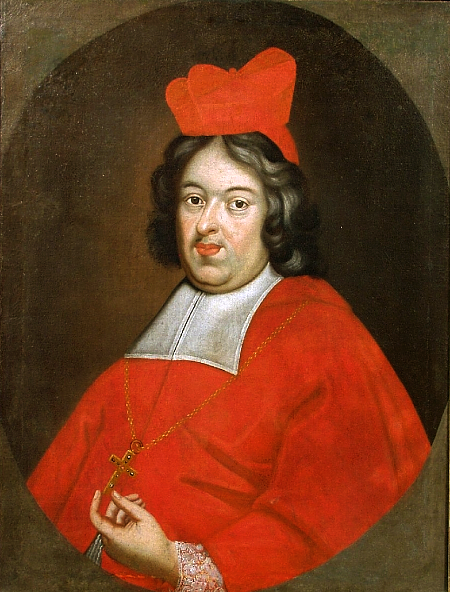
- Archdiocese: Gniezno
- See: Archdiocese of Gniezno
- Installed: 1688
- Term ended: 1705

Orders
- Consecration: 26 January 1681
- Created cardinal: 1686
- Rank: Cardinal-Priest

Personal details
- Born: 3 December 1645 Radziejowice
- Died: 13 October 1705 (aged 59) Gdańsk
- Denomination: Roman Catholic
- Coat of arms

Augustyn Michał Stefan Radziejowski (3 December 1645 – 13 October 1705) was a Polish religious leader who was archbishop of Gniezno, bishop of Warmia, and cardinal primate of the Catholic Church in Poland. He was the son of Hieronim Radziejowski. After the death of the Polish king John III Sobieski, with whom he had a very good relationship, he functioned as the Interrex until the choice of a new king.

== History ==
Radziejowski first supported the candidacy of François Louis, Prince of Conti. Later, he supported August II the Strong, the eventual successor to John III. Radziejowski is noted as an art patron.

== Death ==
He died in Gdańsk (Danzig) on 13 October 1705.

Catholic Church titles
Regnal titles
Preceded by Jan Stefan Wydżga	Prince-Bishop of Warmia (Ermland); 1680–1688	Succeeded by Jan Stanisław Zbąski
Catholic Church titles
Preceded by Jan IX Stefan Wydźga vacant	Archbishop of Gniezno; Primate of Poland; 1688–1705	Succeeded by Stanisław II Szembek
