= Stanisław Radziejowski =

Junosza coat of arms.

Stanisław Radziejowski (1575–1637) was a Polish nobleman, Voivode of Rawa, Voivode of Łęczyca, starost of Sochaczew, castellan of Rawa Mazowiecka.

Married firstly Katarzyna Sobieska, father of Hieronim Radziejowski, later married to Krystyna Sapieha, the daughter of Jan Piotr Sapieha.
