= First Romanian trans-African expedition =

Romanian trans-African expedition

The first Romanian trans-African expedition took place between November 1970 and May 1971, including the time required for transporting the participants and vehicles to and from Africa. The expedition was scientific in nature, aiming to collect African fauna and flora, making a documentary film about the places visited, and creating a set of slides. The expedition also aimed to test Romanian-made vehicles on a challenging African route.

== Preparation and transport of cars to Africa ==
=== Background ===
The idea for the expedition was conceived in Cluj-Napoca. The team consisted of geneticist Nicolae Coman, assistant professor at the Faculty of Biology and Zoology of the Babeș-Bolyai University, engineer Liviu Ungureanu, head of the Filmmaking Laboratory of the same institution, dentist Sever Popa, assistant at the Medical-Pharmaceutical Institute, biologists Dragoș Neculce and Valeriu Cimpoeru, the former a researcher at the Arcalia Station of Cluj University, the latter an editor at the Romanian Television. In order to obtain approval to leave the country, the expedition had to be carried out under an official "flag", under the aegis of the government. Thus, for the sake of "prestige", the leadership of the project was assigned to Academician Nicolae Botnariuc, from the University of Bucharest. However, before the expedition, a great deal of persistence and patience was required to obtain all the necessary documents and stamps. It was not until the fall of 1970 that the green light was given to their trans-African expedition, on the route of Senegal, Mali, Upper Volta, Niger, Nigeria, Cameroon, Chad, Central Africa, Zaire, Rwanda, Uganda, and Kenya. From the Atlantic Ocean to the Indian Ocean, they had to travel 18,000 kilometres (11,000 mi) with three Romanian-made cars, being an ARO IMS M461 passenger car and two TVs. Two employees from the ARO plant in Câmpulung Muscel also joined the trip, to study how the engines behave on rough terrain. Thus, the team included engineer Ioan Cataranciuc, the head of the prototypes department and technician Constantin Ludu.

=== The trip to Africa ===
The expedition departed from Cluj-Napoca on November 10, 1970, crossing Yugoslavia to board the commercial ship "Bohinj" in the port of Rijeka on November 16. After several stops in the ports of the Adriatic and the Tyrrhenian Seas, the travelers proceeded to the Atlantic, disembarking on December 10 in Dakar.

== Crossing Africa from west to east ==
During the few days spent in Dakar, with the Romanian camp located near a shooting range used by French soldiers stationed in Senegal, the expedition obtained visas for Niger and Chad. The biologists carried out an underwater exploration along the Atlantic coast to collect specific plants and animals and a visit to Saint Louis, the former capital of Senegal. Scientific institutions were visited and Professor Botnariuc gave an interview about the purpose of the Romanian expedition. After leaving Dakar, the expedition vehicles encountered un unpaved laterite road, on which they continued, with few exceptions, their route to the end. On the way to Mali, crossing the Senegalese savannah, the expedition passed through Kaolack, an important center for peanut production, Tambacounda, the capital of eastern Senegal, and the Niokolo-Koba National Park, where several fires could be observed in the dry savannah. The border between Senegal and Mali, formed by the Faleme river, could not be crossed due to the lack of ferries, the only option was to travel by train to Kayes.

The expedition participants crossed areas of unrest, completely deserted areas where people lived in the wild, areas with savannah fires, and desert regions. They parked their cars at the equator at one point, climbed to an altitude of over 3,000 meters in the mountains of Kenya towards the end of the expedition. On April 2, 1971, they arrived in Mombasa, Kenya, on the shores of the Indian Ocean. The Romanian cars made it to the end safely, even though they faced challenges due to harsh conditions, requiring wheel changes and minor repairs that were successfully carried out along the route. During the expedition, the participants collected thousands of biological samples, which were studied by scientists and entered into the heritage of several museums. The significance of this expedition is symbolic for the Romanian automotive industry, as it was the first of its kind and remains unmatched to this day in terms of its endurance and scale.
