= Derways Cowboy =

Overview
- Manufacturer: Derways
- Production: 2004–2006
- Assembly: Russia: Cherkessk, Karachay-Cherkessia

Body and chassis
- Class: SUV
- Body style: 5-door
- Layout: Front-engine, all-wheel-drive layout
- Related: ARO 244

The Derways Cowboy (Russian: Дервейс Ковбой, romanized: Derveys Kovboy), also known as the Derways 3131, is a boxy, five-door, J-segment SUV with a panel-on-space-frame design. It was manufactured at the Derways factory in Cherkessk, Karachay-Cherkessia, Russia, from 2004 to 2006. The first prototype of the Cowboy was designed and assembled in 2003 and showcased at the International Motor Show in Moscow.

== Description ==
The SUV was built using components and units from the Romanian ARO 244, including the transmission, steering, brakes, and suspension, while the body was constructed using flat metal panels on a tubular space frame. Later, Chinese chassis were incorporated. The Cowboy successfully passed all tests at the training ground and received certification. The production plant opened in 2004, marking the start of serial production. By the end of the year, the factory was nearing its design capacity of producing five thousand cars annually. However, in 2006, the plant suspended Cowboy production due to ARO's bankruptcy and shifted to local production of Chinese cars.

The Cowboy was designed by Oleg Shapkin from Tolyatti. Standard features included an adjustable steering column with height adjustment, power windows for all doors, electric mirrors, a door with a gasket, a removable roof hatch, and front fog lights. Removing the rear seats increased the trunk volume from 600 liters to 1,600 liters. The interior featured a steering wheel, dashboard, and center console from the VAZ 2110, along with seats from the UAZ. The Cowboy was offered with four engine options. The transmission featured selectable four-wheel drive with a locking inter-axle differential and a low-range gear. Air conditioning was not standard. The vehicle had hydraulic steering, independent front suspension with springs, and rear suspension with independent springs. The front brakes were ventilated discs, and the rear brakes were drums, with tire size 265.

The Cowboy was produced on the ARO 244 chassis until 2005, when production shifted to a Chinese chassis, continuing until 2006.

Approximately 800 Cowboys were sold, although some sources claim Derways produced around 5,000 Cowboys and a few hundred on Chinese chassis. However, Kostya from AcademeG believes only 164 Cowboys were produced.

== Engines ==
Throughout its production, the Cowboy was equipped with four different engines:

1. ZMZ-409.10: The baseline engine, a 2.7-liter DOHC inline-four gasoline engine, producing 142 hp at 4,400 rpm and 230 Nm at 3,900 rpm. It was paired with a Romanian 5-speed manual gearbox.
2. Peugeot DW10TD (EURO III): An optional 2.0-liter DOHC turbo diesel inline-four engine, producing 90 hp at 4,000 rpm and 205 Nm at 1,900 rpm, sourced from the French company INC.
3. Mitsubishi 4G64: A 2.4-liter fuel-injected inline-four engine, produced by Shenyang Aerospace Mitsubishi Motors Engine Manufacturing (SAME).
4. Nissan VG30E: A 3.0-liter V6 engine with a displacement of 2,960 cc, producing 153 hp (114 kW) and 247 Nm (182 lb⋅ft) of torque. The engine has a bore and stroke of 87 mm × 83 mm (3.43 in × 3.27 in).

== Specifications ==
- Length - 4440 mm/174.8 ins
- Width - 1813 mm/71.4 ins
- Height - 1880 mm/74.1 ins
- Wheelbase - 2600 mm/102.3 ins
- Track
  - Front - 1510 mm/59.45 ins
  - Rear - 1500 mm/59.06 ins
- Ground clearance - 230 mm/9.05 ins
- Wheel size - 265/70/R16
- Luggage space volume - min - 600 L/160 gallons, max - 1600 L/422.7 gallons
- Fuel tank capacity - 90 L/23.7 gallons
- Curb weight - 1880 kg/4144.7 lbs
- Full mass - 2540 kg/5643.8 lbs
- Max load - 777 kg/1712.99 lbs
- Max speed - 145 km/h/90.1 mph

== Variants ==
The Cowboy was available in four different variants:

1. 313101: Chinese variant.
2. 313102: Chinese variant.
3. 313104: Original ARO-based variant.
4. 313105: Chinese variant.

== See also ==
- Tagaz Aquila - a panel on space frame Russian then French sedan.
- TM 1131 - a compact panel on frame economy car developed by JSC "Mishka-Tula-Moscow" (Rus:Мишка-Тула-Москва), a subsidiary of ZiL.
