= ARO 10 =

ARO 10/11
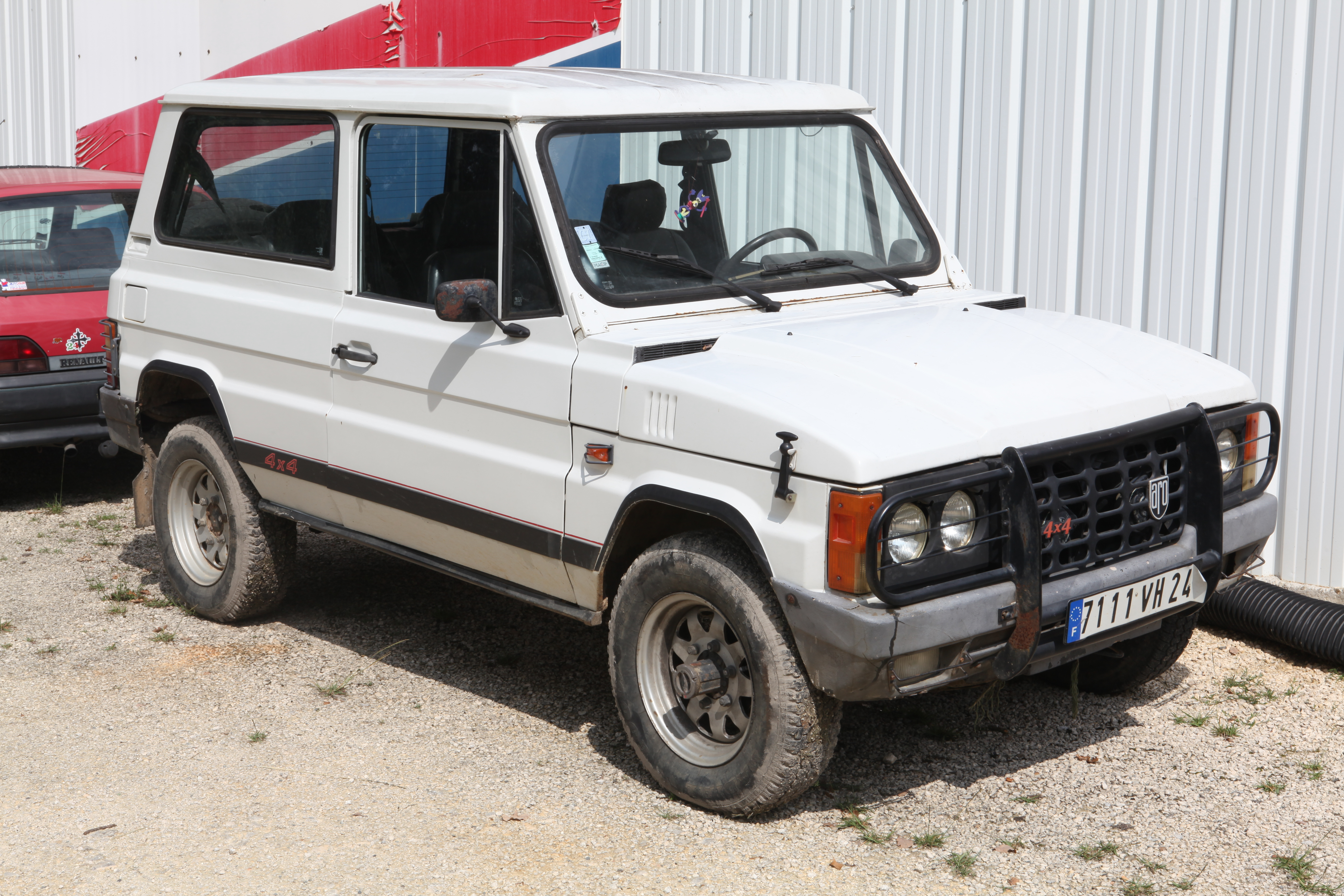

Overview
- Manufacturer: ARO
- Also called: ARO Ischia (Italy: 1984–1985); ARO SuperIschia (Italy: 1985–1987); ARO Enduro x4 (Italy: 1987–1989); ACM Enduro x4 (Italy: 1987–1989); ARO Dacia (Spain); Dacia 10; Dacia Duster (United Kingdom)
- Production: 1980–2006
- Assembly: Romania: Câmpulung-Muscel

Body and chassis
- Class: Off-road vehicle
- Body style: 2-door SUV; 2-door convertible 4-door SUV; 2-door pickup 4-door pickup
- Layout: Front-engine, rear-wheel drive / Four-wheel drive
- Related: ARO 24 Series

Powertrain
- Engine: 1.3 L I4 (Dacia); 1.4 L I4 (Dacia); 1.6 L I4 (Dacia, Daewoo, Volkswagen); 1.6 L Diesel I4 (Volkswagen); 1.9 L Diesel I4 (Renault); 2.0 L Diesel I4 (Peugeot)
- Transmission: 4-speed manual 5-speed manual

Dimensions
- Wheelbase: 2,400 mm (94 in) - 2,650 mm (104 in)
- Length: 3,910 mm (154 in) - 4,815 mm (189.6 in)
- Width: 1,705 mm (67.1 in)
- Height: 1,790 mm (70 in)

Chronology
- Successor: Dacia Duster (Dacia models)

The ARO 10 was an off-road vehicle produced by ARO and manufactured in Romania from 1980 to 2006. It shares auto-parts with Dacia 1300, from engine to front axle, and was inspired by the Renault Rodeo and Citroën Méhari.

The ARO 24 Series got a "little brother" in 1980, the ARO 10 Series. While the ARO-24 can be classified as mid-size SUVs, the ARO 10 is about the size of a Jeep Wrangler. It was produced in many body trims, equipped with seven different engines (both gas and Diesel), and came in both 4x2 and 4x4 versions. The ARO 10 was also sold as the Dacia Duster in the United Kingdom and Dacia 10 in some international markets. A model derived from the ARO 10, named ARO Spartana, was also produced starting 1997. The last evolution of ARO 10, produced from 1999, was called ARO 10 Super, had a slight design revamp and was built on ARO 24 Series chassis. The vehicle was available to many exports markets, and in the United Kingdom it was available as the Dacia Duster, up until 2006, when it was discontinued. The Duster name was later used on another SUV that in some way replaced the previous model.

== First generation (1980) ==
In addition to being sold as the "Dacia Duster" in the United Kingdom and a few other markets, the car received several different names in Italy: Local company Ali Ciemme (ACM) assembled the ARO 10 there in the 1980s and sold it as the "Aro Super Ischia" with the 1.4-liter Renault petrol engine license built by Dacia. When fitted with Volkswagen's 1.6-liter petrol or diesel engines it was sold as the Aro Enduro x4, from 1987 until 1989. A turbodiesel was presented at the end of 1988. Sales volumes of Italian-assembled cars were not very large, reaching 2500 examples in 1987 and 1800 cars in 1988. Volkswagen-engined cars had 28 percent Romanian parts content, with the remainder being Italian and German. The Volkswagen-engined versions also received a stronger differential, to handle the additional torque.

=== Engines ===
Name	Capacity	Type	Power	Torque
1.3 Petrol	1289 cc	Dacia	54 hp (40 kW) at 5250 rpm	89 N⋅m (66 lb⋅ft) at 4000 rpm
1.4 Petrol	1397 cc	Dacia	62 PS (46 kW) at 5500 rpm	100 N⋅m (74 lb⋅ft) at 3300 rpm
1.6 Petrol	1557 cc	Dacia	72 PS (53 kW) at 5000 rpm	122 N⋅m (90 lb⋅ft) at 2500 rpm
1.6 Petrol	1595 cc	VW	75 PS (55 kW) at 5000 rpm	125 N⋅m (92 lb⋅ft) at 2500 rpm
1.6 Petrol	1598 cc	Daewoo	105 PS (77 kW) at 5800 rpm	145 N⋅m (107 lb⋅ft) at 3400 rpm
1.6 Diesel	1588 cc	VW	54 PS (40 kW) at 4800 rpm	100 N⋅m (74 lb⋅ft) at 2300-2900 rpm
1.9 Diesel	1905 cc	Peugeot	68 PS (50 kW) at 4600 rpm	120 N⋅m (89 lb⋅ft) at 2000 rpm
1.9 Diesel	1870 cc	Renault	64 PS (47 kW) at 4500 rpm	121 N⋅m (89 lb⋅ft) at 2250 rpm
1.9 Diesel	1870cc	Renault	92 PS (68 kW) at 4250 rpm	175 N⋅m (129 lb⋅ft) at 2250 rpm

== Spartana ==
ARO Spartana

Overview
- Production: 1997–2006

Body and chassis
- Body style: 2-door convertible
- Layout: Front-engine, rear-wheel drive / Four-wheel drive

Powertrain
- Engine: 1.2 L I4 (Renault); 1.4 L I4 (Dacia); 1.6 L I4 (Dacia, Daewoo); 1.9 L I4 Diesel (Renault)
- Transmission: 5-speed manual

Dimensions
- Wheelbase: 2,400 mm (94 in)
- Length: 3,685 mm (145.1 in)
- Width: 1,645 mm (64.8 in)
- Height: 1,660 mm (65 in)
- Curb weight: 950–1,040 kg (2,090–2,290 lb)

Name	Capacity	Power	Type	Torque
1.2 Petrol	1239 cc	Renault	54 hp (40 kW) at 5300 rpm	90 N⋅m (66 lb⋅ft) at 2800 rpm
1.4 Petrol	1397 cc	Dacia	62 hp (46 kW) at 5500 rpm	100 N⋅m (74 lb⋅ft) at 3300 rpm
1.6 Petrol	1557 cc	Dacia	72 hp (54 kW) at 5000 rpm	122 N⋅m (90 lb⋅ft) at 2500 rpm
1.6 Petrol	1598 cc	Daewoo	105 hp (78 kW) at 5800 rpm	145 N⋅m (107 lb⋅ft) at 3400 rpm
1.9 Diesel	1870 cc	Renault	64 hp (48 kW) at 4500 rpm	121 N⋅m (89 lb⋅ft) at 2250 rpm
1.9 Diesel	1870 cc	Renault	92 hp (69 kW) at 4250 rpm	175 N⋅m (129 lb⋅ft) at 2250 rpm

== Versions ==
=== Sport Utility Vehicles ===
- ARO 10.1 2-door Convertible
- ARO 10.4 3-door
- ARO 10 Spartana
- ARO 11.4 5-door

=== Light Commercial Vehicles ===
- ARO 10.6 Regular Cab Pick-up
- ARO 11.9 Double Cab Pick-up

Other Versions: 10.0, 10.2, 10.3, 10.5, 10.9.

== Gallery ==
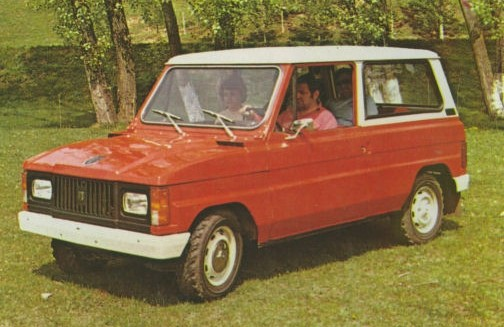
ARO 10 (1980–1991)

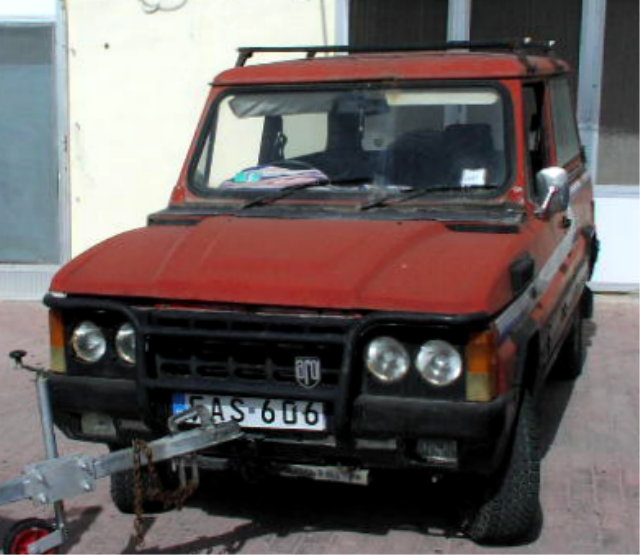
ARO 10 (1992–1999)

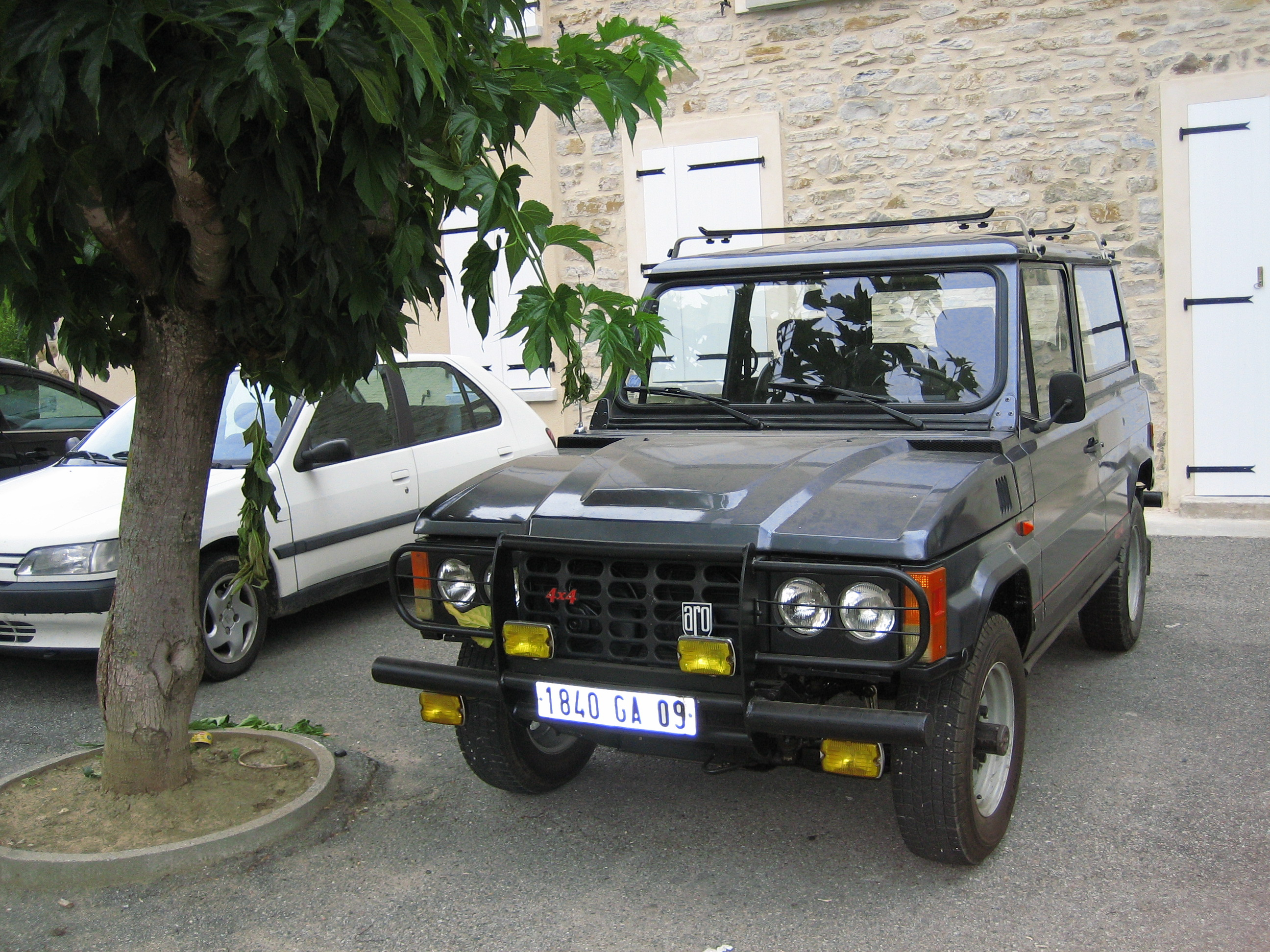
ARO 10 in Lavelanet Canton of Foix arrondissement, Ariège, Midi-Pyrénées, France

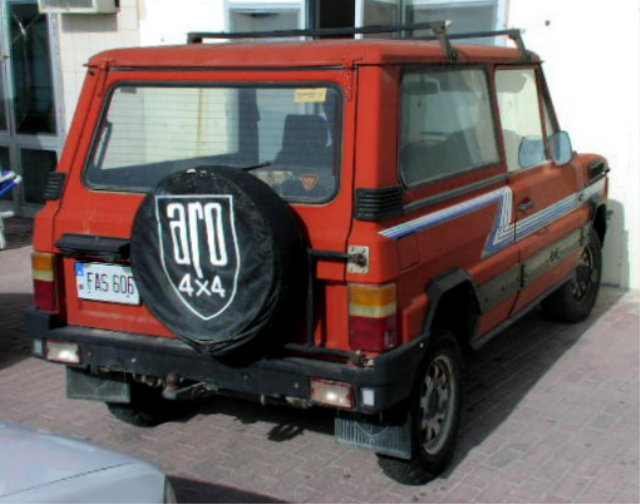
ARO 10 rear view

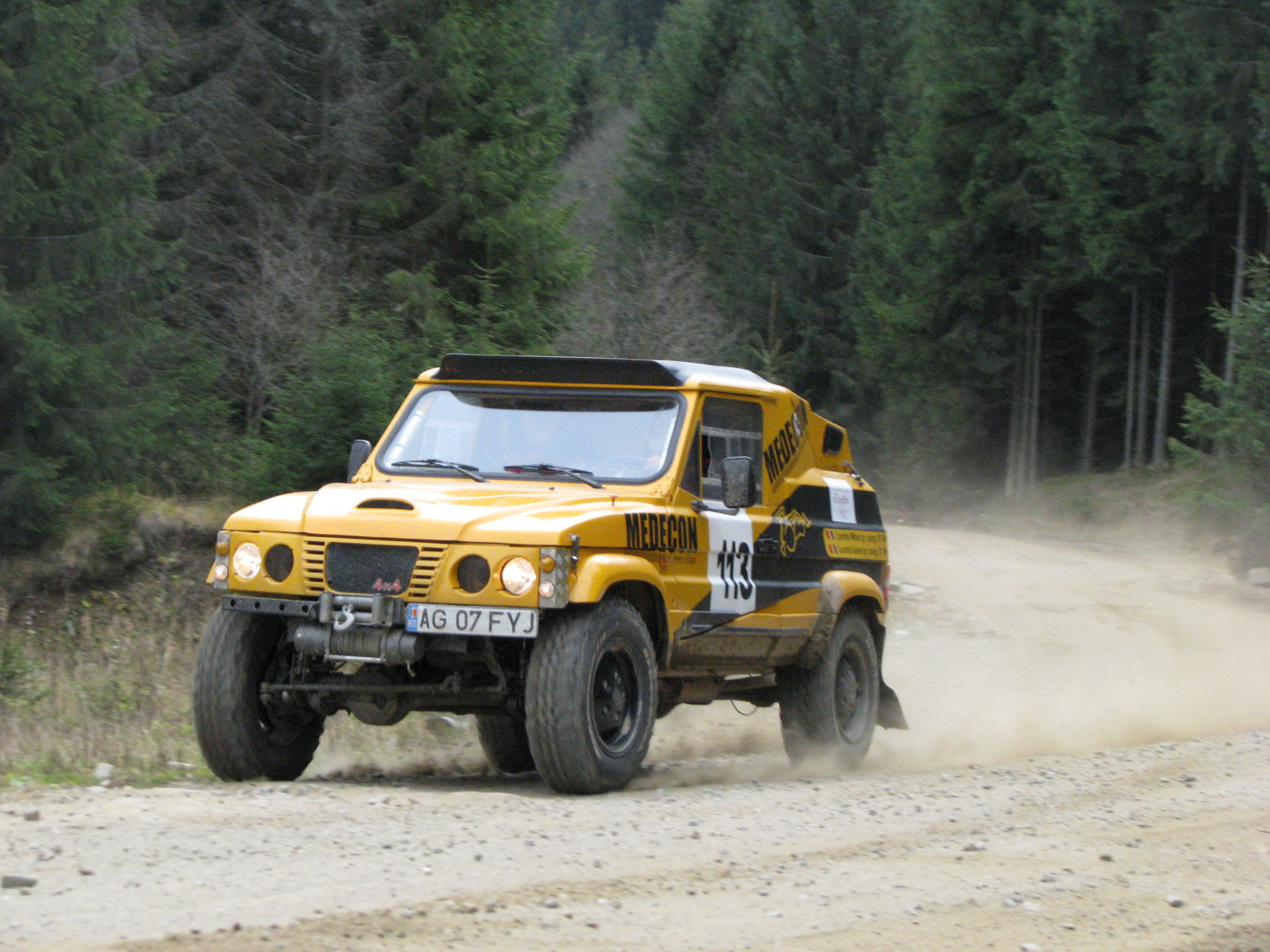
ARO 10 Super (1999–06)

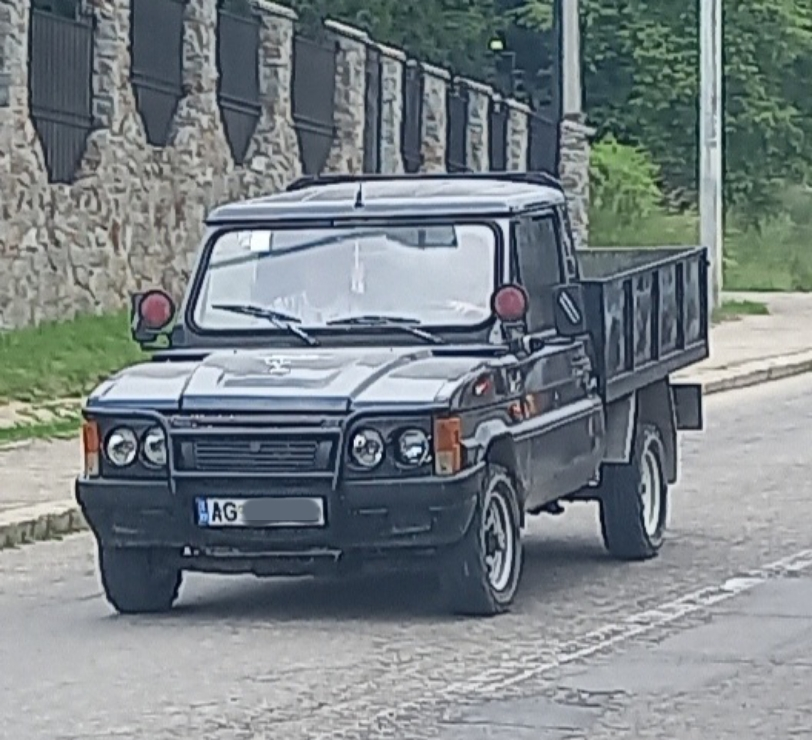
ARO 10.6 Drop Side

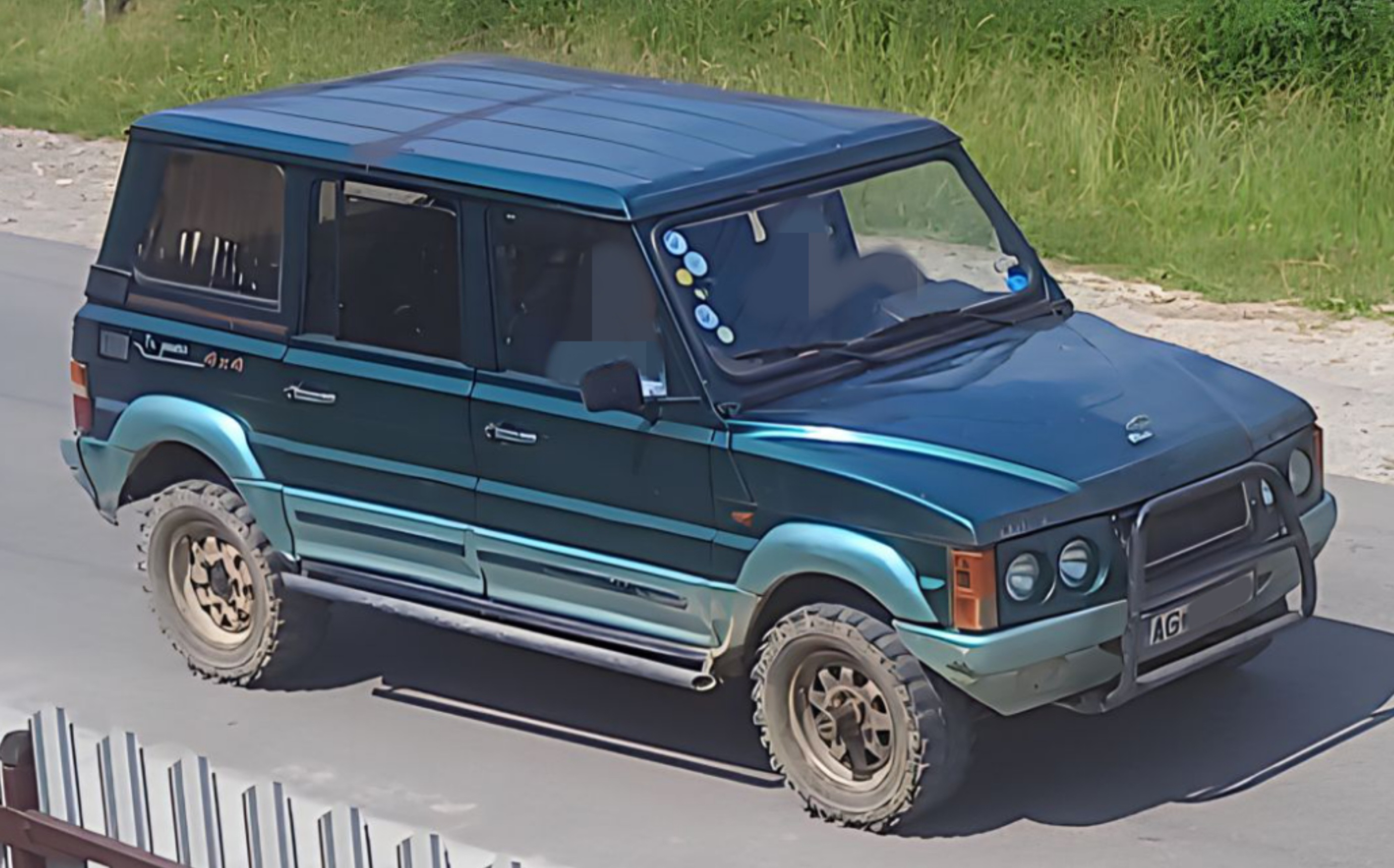
ARO 11.4

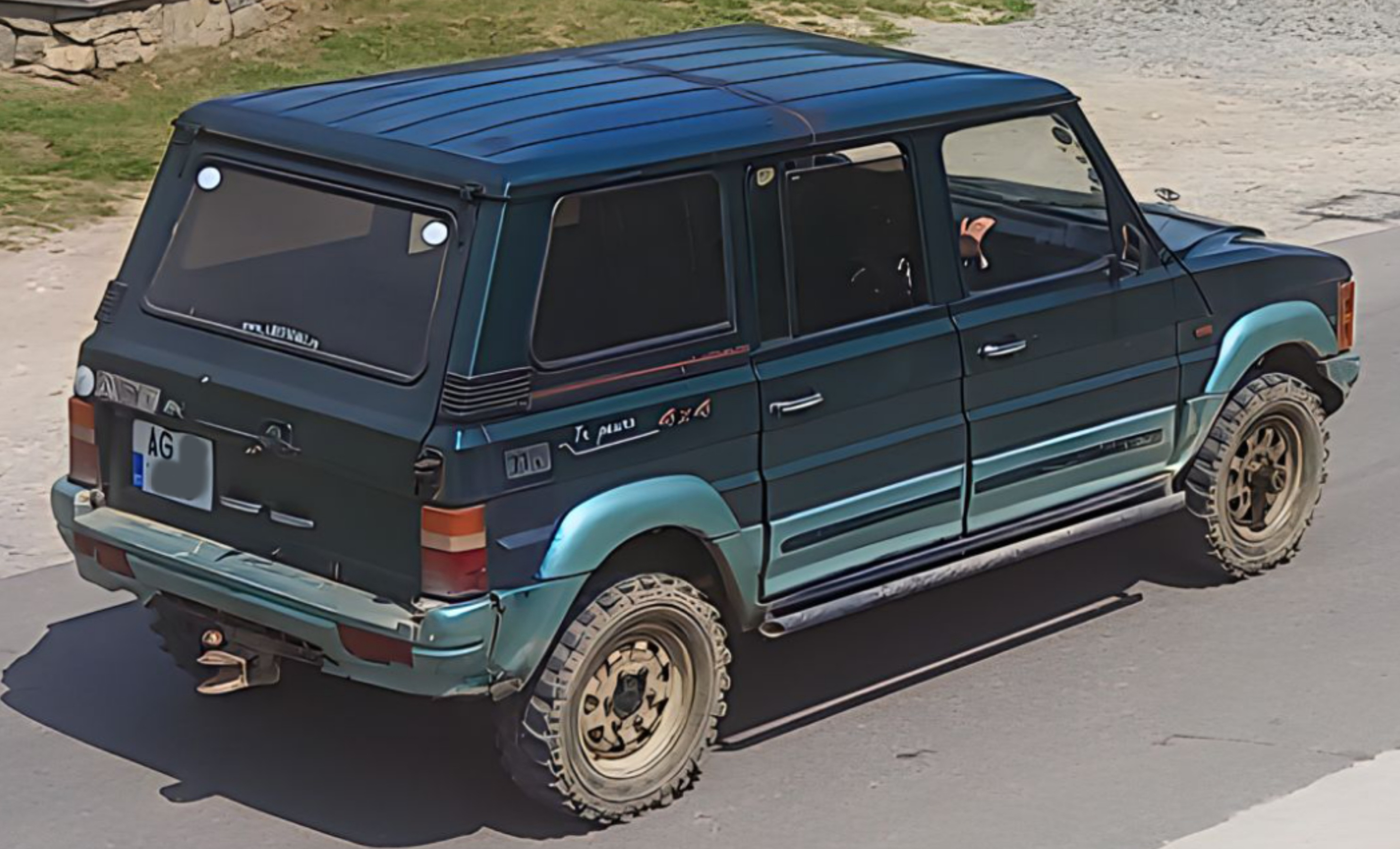
ARO 11.4

== See also ==
- ARO M461
- ARO 24 Series
- Dacia Duster
