= ARO (company) =

Defunct Romanian off-road vehicle manufacturer

ARO S.A.
- Type: Joint-stock company
- Industry: Automotive
- Founded: 1957
- Defunct: 2006
- Fate: Bankruptcy
- Headquarters: Câmpulung, Argeş, Romania
- Products: Off-road vehicles
- Website: aro-classiccars.com (under construction)

ARO (short for Auto Romania) was a Romanian off-road vehicle manufacturer located in Câmpulung. The first ARO vehicles were produced in 1957, and the last in 2003. For a short while, Daihatsu-powered AROs were sold in Spain and produced in Portugal under the "Portaro" brand. In Italy, AROs were produced and sold under the ACM brand, often fitted with Volkswagen engines.

In 2009, an attempt was made to restart low volume production of ARO vehicles under the aegis of a Czech company called Auto Max Czech (AMC). During the mid-2000s, Russian manufacturer Derways used ARO chassis to produce its Derways Cowboy model.

== History ==
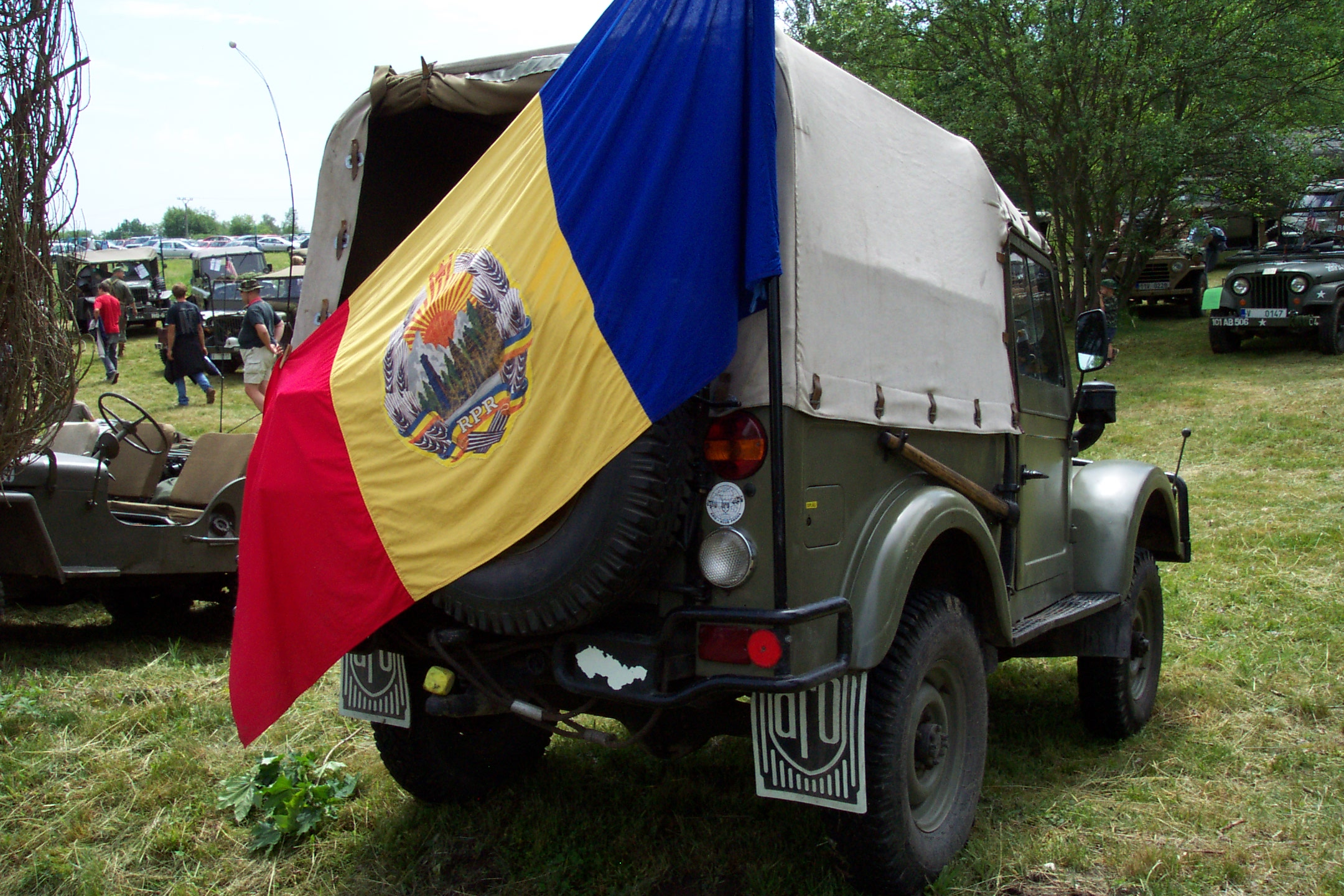
ARO M461

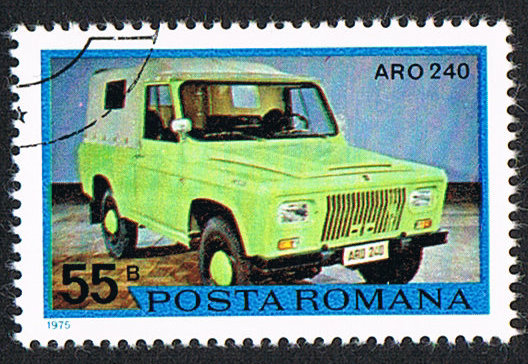
ARO 240 (1975 stamp)

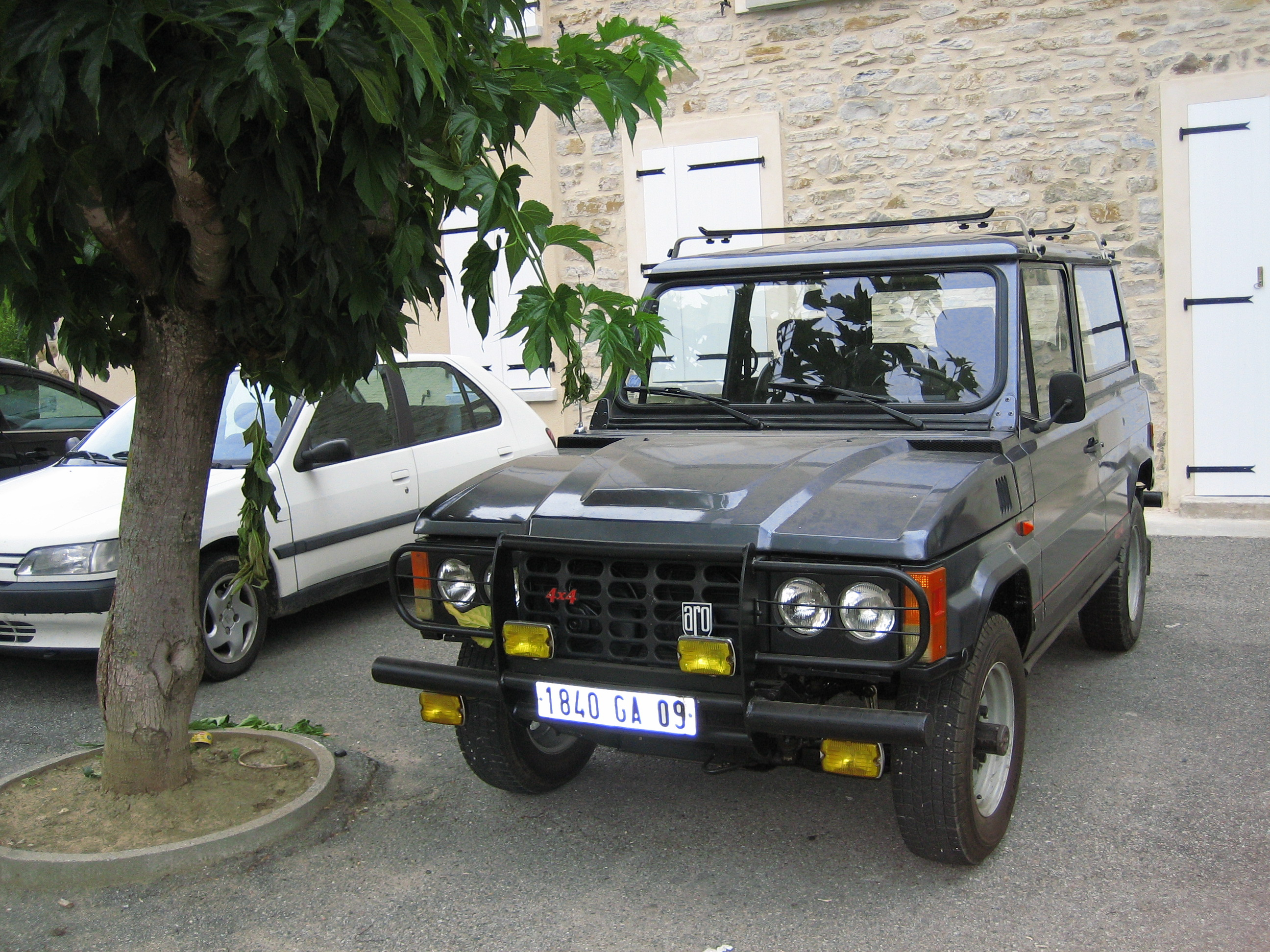
ARO 10 4x4

The first factory in Câmpulung was built during the Second World War, under orders from Marshal Ion Antonescu, starting 1942. The facility was initially meant to produce airscrews, being an extension of the Romanian aircraft manufacturer IAR. After the war, this factory formed the base for ARO.

=== The beginning ===
ARO manufactured over 380,000 vehicles, 2/3 of which were exported to some 110 countries on five continents (before 1989 about 90% of the ARO production was exported). AROs were also produced in Brazil, Italy, and Portugal (Portaro) often under another brandname. ARO vehicles were also produced for Spain and marketed under the name Hisparo managed by the company Enasa.

Production started in 1957 with the IMS-57, which was the first model of the IMS Series, produced under a GAZ-69 license. In 1959 the IMS-57 model was replaced by the M59, followed by a new model in 1964 called the M461. Though its styling and design were based on its predecessors, the M461 had clearly distinguishable features also boasting fit and finish improvements fitted with redesigned mechanicals.

In 1972 ARO successfully launched a ground-up redesign as their new family of models, the 24 Series which eventually included many models and configurations. The ARO 24 Series got a "little brother" in 1980, the 10 Series, also produced in many body trims with different engines and in both 4x2 and 4x4 variants. ARO engines and other technology was also utilized in T.V. light commercial vehicles.

=== Armored variant ===
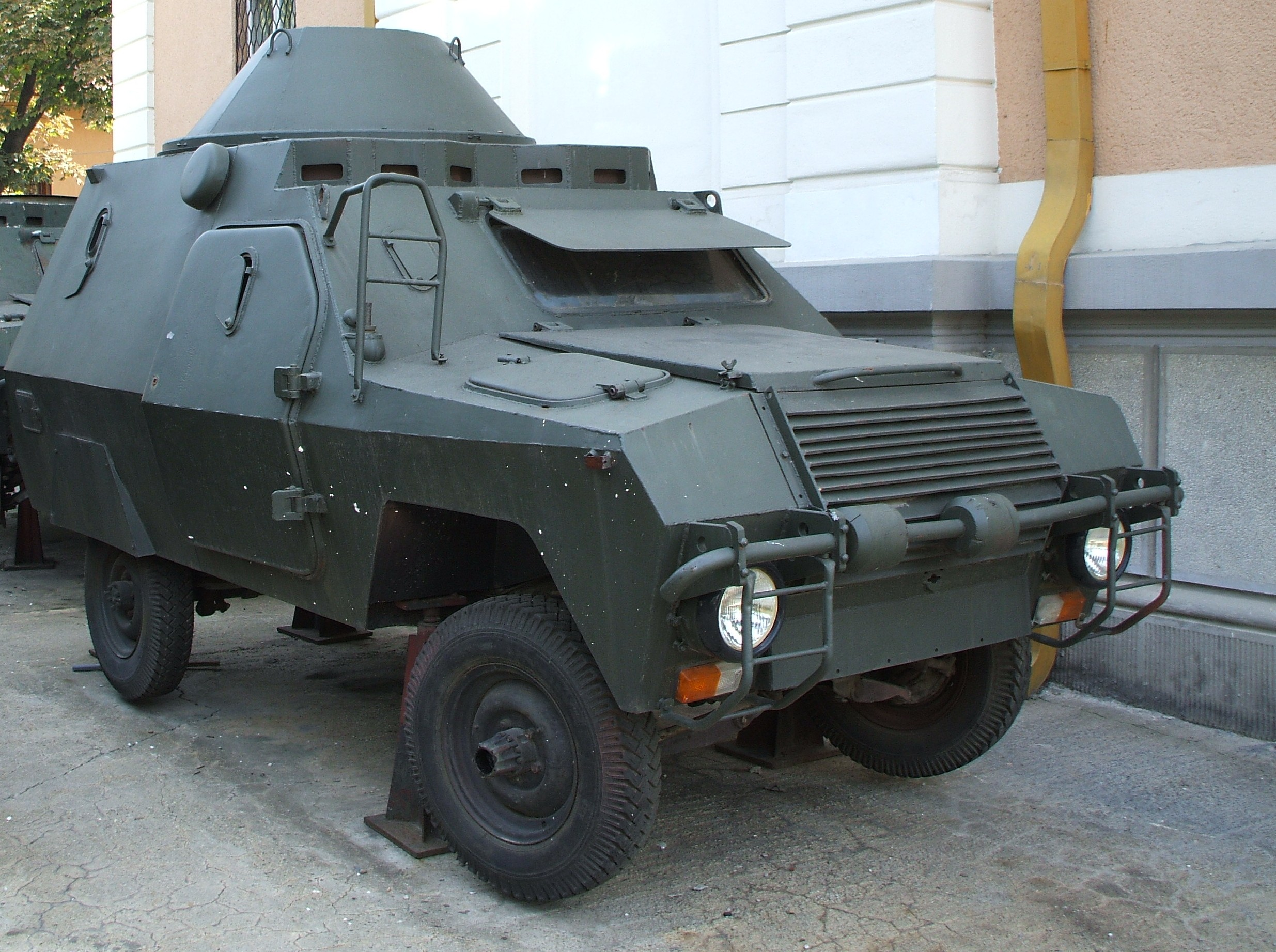
An ABI armored car used during the Romanian Revolution in December 1989

The ABI (Autovehicul Blindat pentru Intervenție) armored car was built on the ARO chassis, using an ARO engine. Seventeen such vehicles were produced in 1979 and were used for internal security duties. Their armor ranged from 4 to 10 mm and they were equipped with a turret that housed a 7.62 mm PK machine gun, or a 12.7 mm DShK heavy machine gun mounted on top. Top speed was 100 km/h. In 1986, 5 were delivered to Liberia and in 1987 10 were delivered to Algeria. Export variant was called AM 100. The remaining 2 were destroyed during the Romanian Revolution and now their wrecks can be seen at the National Military Museum, in Bucharest.

=== Privatization ===
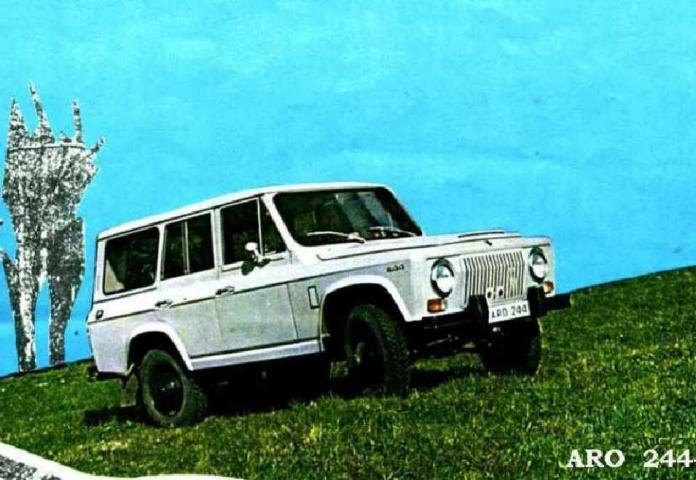
ARO 244 (1977)

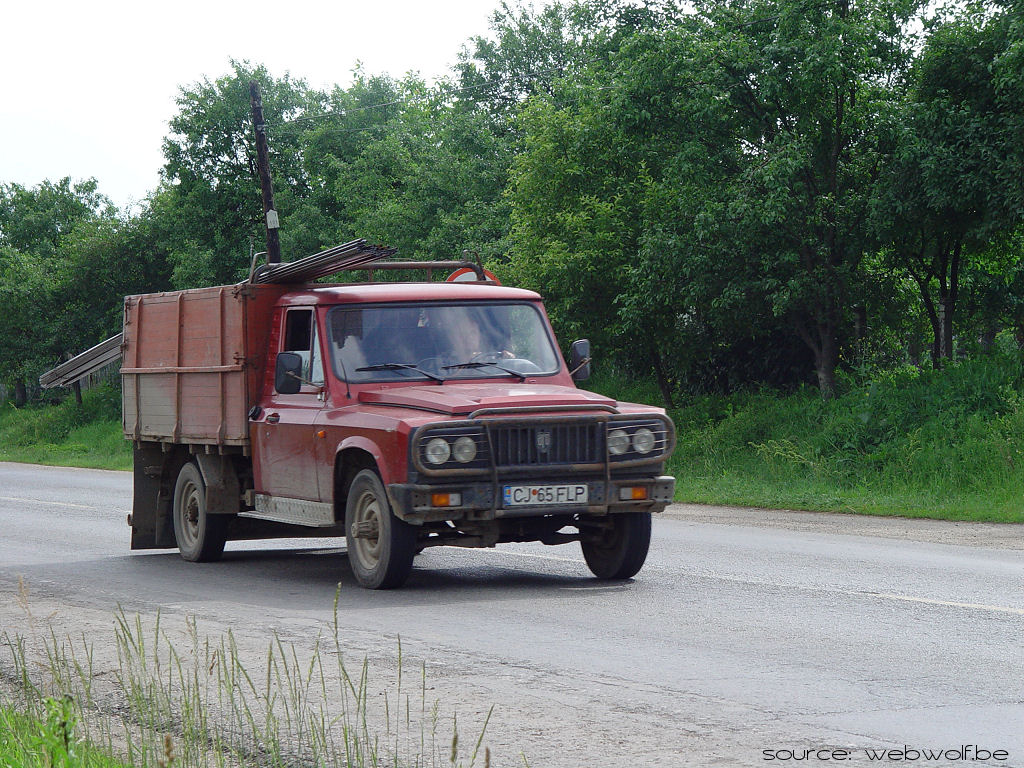
ARO 324 Pick-up

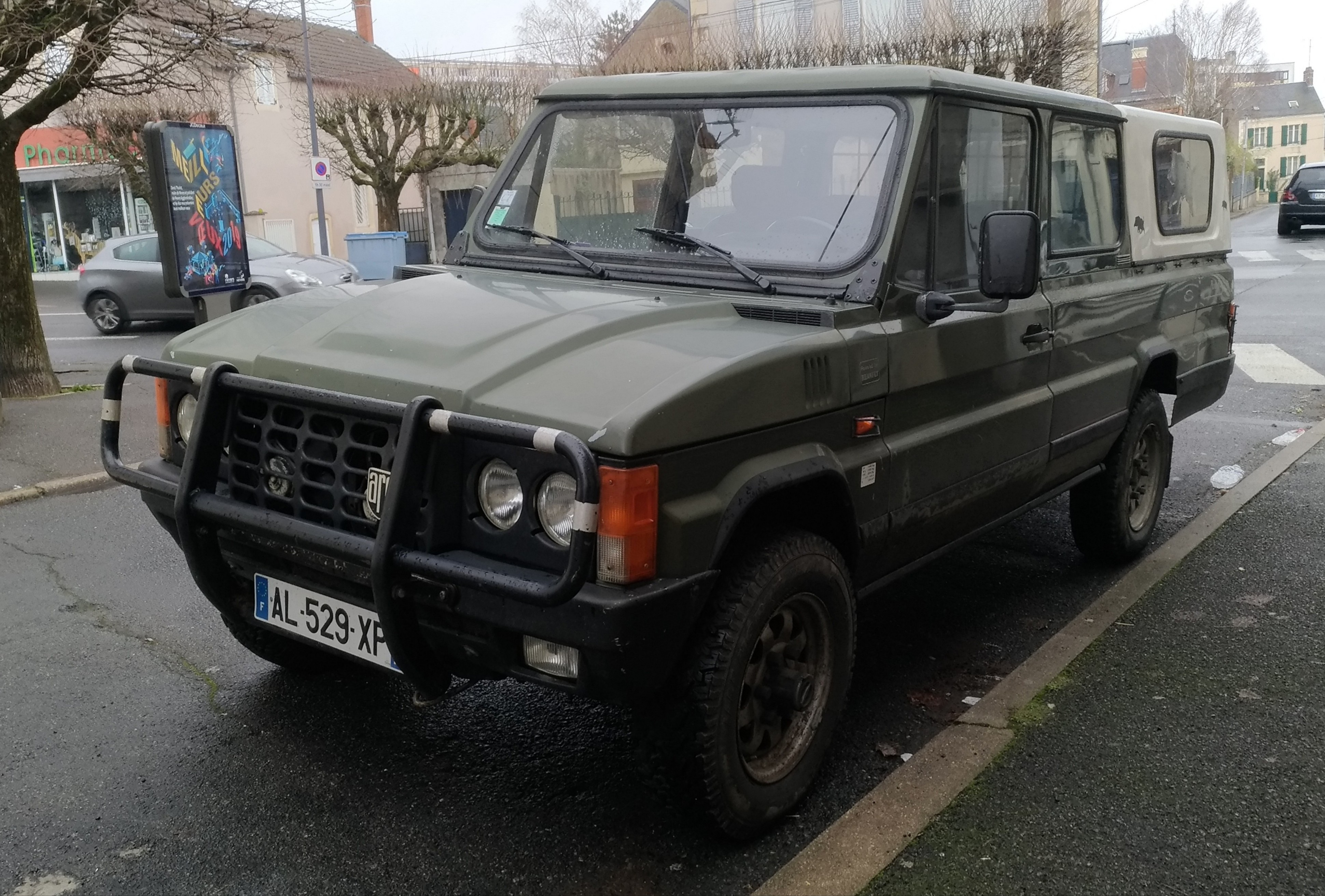
ARO 10 Pick-Up Pancho

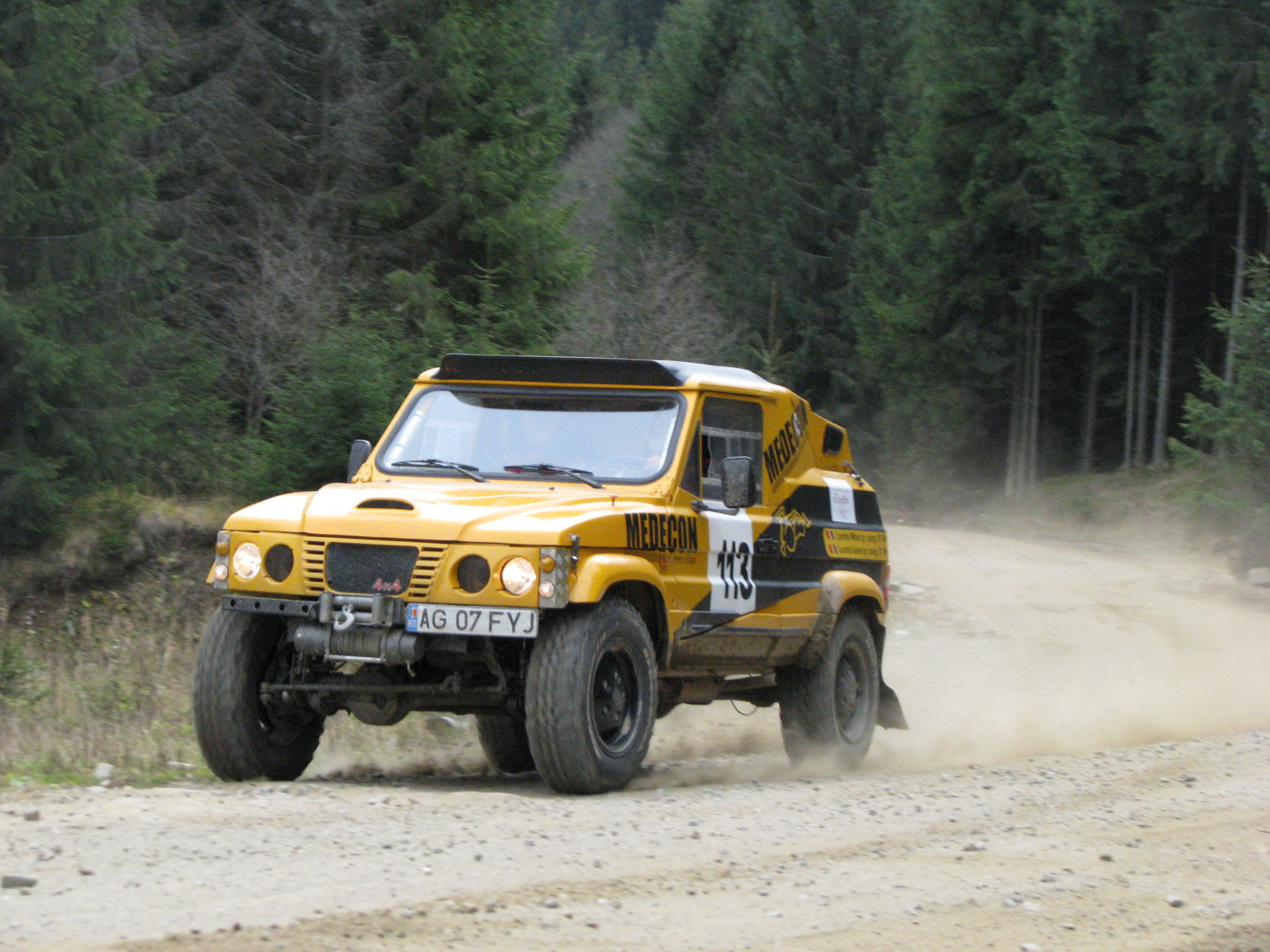
Cross-country ARO 10 Super Rally in Dracula Rally Raid, 2008

In 1998 a Cuban-born American businessman, John Perez, offered franchise agreements to US auto dealers. Some 200 dealers paid $75,000 each for franchise rights, for a total of $15 million. These rights were offered by a company called East European Imports. The ARO was offered as a Warsaw Pact surplus military vehicle. After the franchises were sold, dealers were pressured to send cashier's checks or wire transfers to start receiving vehicles that were allegedly being held in a port in Florida. Dealers refused and insisted to pay upon delivery which eventually led to East European Imports closing its doors.

In September 2003 the Romanian state sold 68.7% of ARO to Cross Lander, a company owned by John Perez, for $180,000 US. The contract stipulated that the company had to invest $2 million US, which allegedly never took place. Instead, all of ARO's production tooling and equipment were sold off; this was an action which violated the privatization contract. The Romanian state sued John Perez in 2006 for falsifying documents in order to acquire the company.

It was planned to enter the US market with the ARO 244 as the Cross Lander 244X, but funding ran out in February 2006. The company Cross Lander USA Inc fired all its employees, sold its headquarters and closed down in February 2006.

ARO went into bankruptcy in June 2006.

=== Amrom ===
The company Amrom Automotive 2006 was negotiating with ARO creditors to purchase the company from bankruptcy, and plans to resume production of the ARO line of vehicles under the ARO name at the Câmpulung factory.

== Models ==
- IMS Series (1957–1975)
- ARO 24 Series (1972–2003)
- ARO 10 Series (1980–2003)
