= ABI (military land vehicle) =

Romanian armoured car

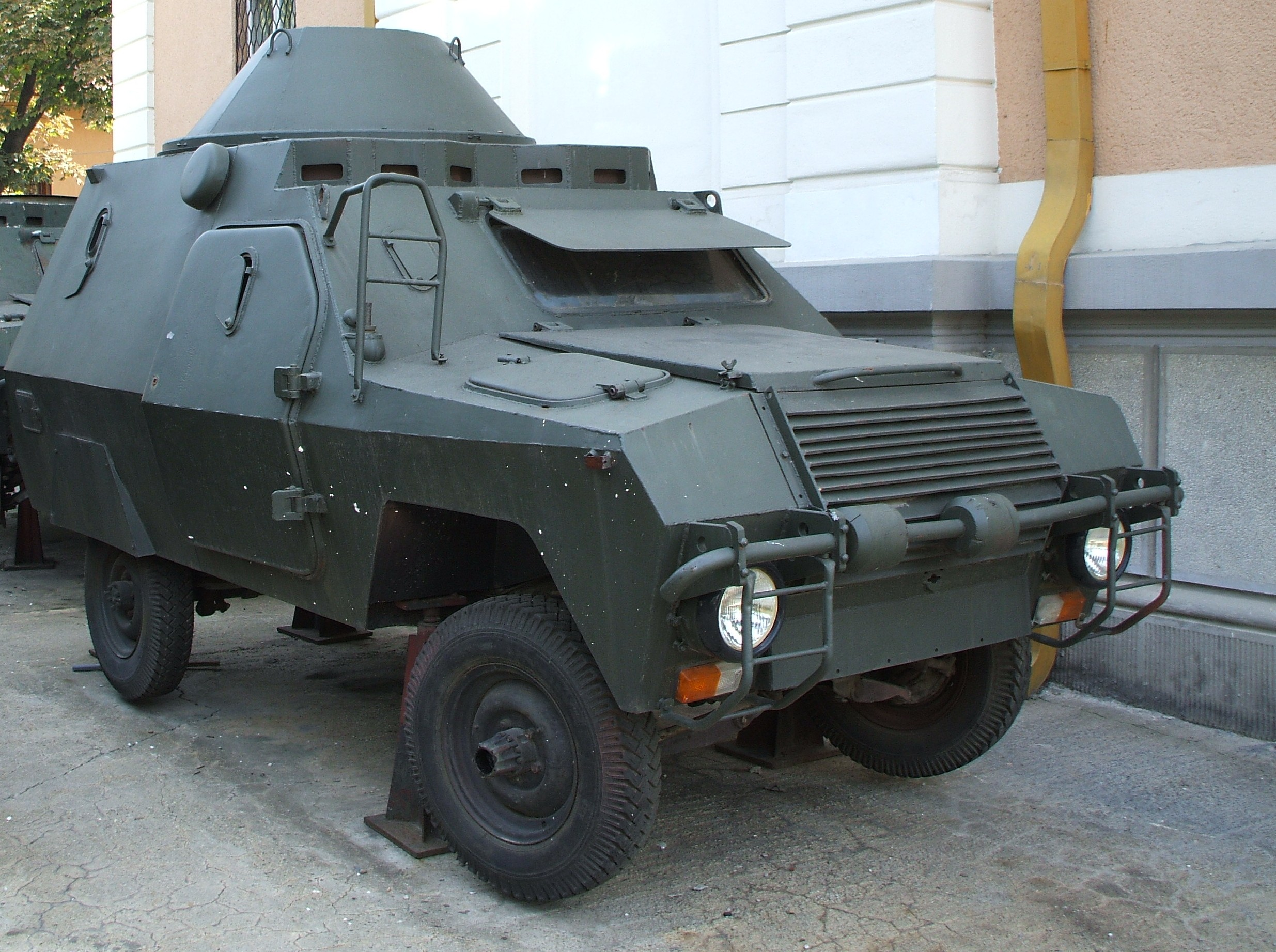
- ABI in the National Military Museum, Romania
- Type: Armoured Car
- Place of origin: Romania

Service history
- Used by: Romania; Algeria; Liberia

Production history
- Designer: Direcția Tancuri și Auto
- Designed: 1978—1979
- Manufacturer: Automecanica Moreni
- Produced: 1979
- No. built: 17
- Variants: AM 100 ALG

Specifications
- Mass: 4,000 kilograms (4.4 short tons; 3.9 long tons)
- Length: 4.22 m (13 ft 10 in)
- Width: 2.225 m (7 ft 3.6 in)
- Height: 1.65 m (5 ft 5 in) (hull)
- Crew: 2 + 4 passengers
- Armor: 4–10 mm
- Main armament: 12.7mm DShK machine gun
- Secondary armament: 7.62 PK machine gun
- Engine: Model D-127 4-stroke diesel 68 hp
- Power/weight: 17 hp/tonne
- Transmission: 4 × 4
- Ground clearance: 0.195 m (7.7 in)
- Operational range: 600 km (370 miles)
- Maximum speed: 90 km/h (56 mph)

Autovehicul Blindat pentru Intervenție (ABI, "Armored Vehicle for Intervention") was a Romanian armored car based on the chassis of the ARO 240 off-road vehicle. Intended for escort and counterinsurgency missions, the ABI armored vehicle was manufactured by Automecanica Moreni. The export variant was known as AM 100 ALG.

== History ==
=== Development ===
In June 1978, the Romanian government expressed their desire to have an armored car based on the ARO 240 vehicle that was equipped with a machine gun. It was to be supplied to airport security units. A prototype was completed by the end of the year. On May 27, 1979, Nicolae Ceausescu ordered the manufacture of a batch of armored vehicles to parade at the August 23 military parade. The armored car, known as the ABI, was also presented to the Romanian Army, but it was rejected and solely used for airport security. 17 ABIs made their appearances in the military parade on August 23, 1979.

=== Service ===
ABI vehicles were used by USLA units during the Romanian Revolution of 1989, when they were involved in several notable incidents, such as the shooting dead of several USLA troops in front of the Ministry of Defense headquarters.

== Design and specifications ==
The ABI was built on the chassis used by the ARO 240. The armor was made of welded steel plates, 4–10 mm thick, and provided protection only against small caliber bullets and splinters. The armored vehicle was vulnerable to 7.62 mm perforating cartridges.

The driver was seated on the left at the front of the vehicle, and the commander was on the right. The commander had two firing ports at his disposal: one in the door to his right, and one on in front of him (the windscreen did not reach all the way across). The driver had one firing port, cut through the door to his left. The windshield and left door window were bulletproof. The windows could be additionally protected with folding armor plates, which lacked any slots. If the windows were covered, the commander and the driver used the six periscopes to see outside. The rear soldiers had four firing ports at their disposal: two in the rear doors and one on each side of the cabin. To see outside, the soldiers used two observation slots and two periscopes. The manually activated turret was equipped with a 7.62 mm PK machine gun, and on the outside it had a 17.7 mm DShKM machine gun.

== Variants ==
- AM 100 ALG: Export version for Algeria equipped with a Bulgarian VAMO Model D 3900 A engine, providing 82.5 hp and maximum road speed of 100 km/h.
- AM 100 Armoured Off Road Vehicle: A marketed version with infra-red searchlights and a white light searchlight.

== Operators ==
- Algeria: 10 vehicles were delivered in 1987 for use by the police.
- Liberia: 5 were delivered in October 1986 and paraded at the military parade in Monrovia on November 16, 1986.
- Romania

== Bibliography ==
- Urdăreanu, Tiberiu (2004). Jurnal 1978-1988 [Journal 1978-1988] (in Romanian). București: Editura Militara. ISBN 978-973-32-0663-7. OCLC 81150009.
