= Cross Lander 244X =

Overview
- Manufacturer: Cross Lander
- Also called: Cross Lander CL-244
- Production: 2002–2006
- Assembly: Brazil: Manaus

Body and chassis
- Class: Off-road vehicle
- Related: ARO 24 Series

Powertrain
- Engine: 2.8 L MWM I4 (turbodiesel)
- Transmission: 5-speed manual

The Cross Lander 244X was a basic, rugged 4x4 SUV built under license from Romanian ARO from 2002 to 2006 in Manaus, Brazil, and based on the ARO 244. ARO was to supply CKD kits to Brazil for assembly by Cross Lander Industria e Comercio. Sales in the United States were expected to begin in 2005, with targets of 6,000 units per year but the launch has been cancelled. The American Cross Lander used Ford's 4.0 L Cologne V6 engine and an Eaton transmission. The engine produces 207 hp (154 kW) and 238 ft·lbf (323 N·m) of torque.

== See also ==
- ARO 24 Series
- ARO
