= ARO M461 =

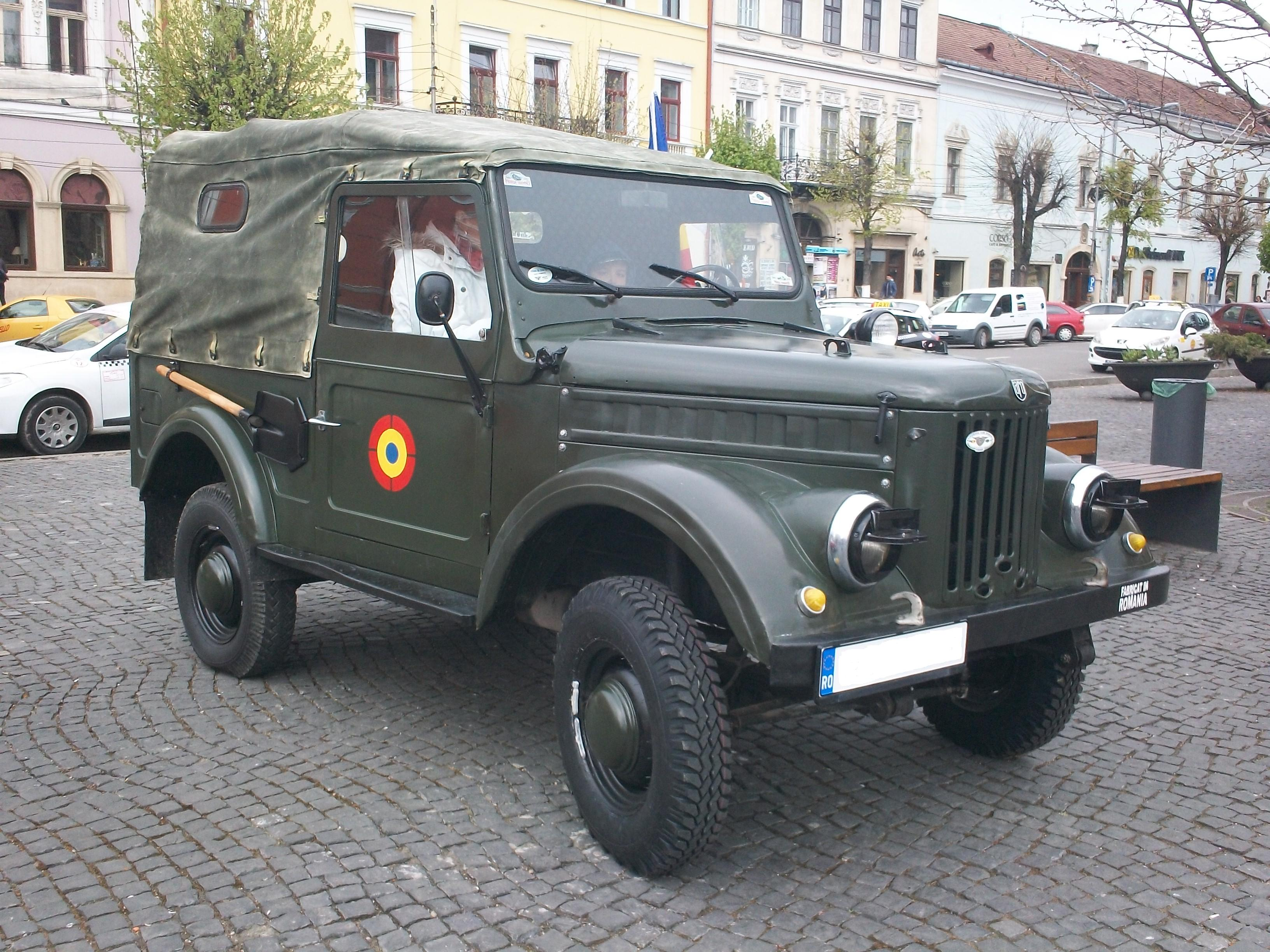
- ARO M461 registered as a classic car in Romania

Overview
- Manufacturer: ARO
- Also called: IMS-57 (1957–1959); M59 (1959–1963)
- Production: 1957–1975
- Assembly: Romania: Câmpulung-Muscel

Body and chassis
- Class: Off-road vehicle
- Body style: 2-door convertible 2-door pick-up
- Layout: F4 layout
- Related: GAZ-69

Powertrain
- Engine: 3.3 L Petrol I4; 2.5 L Petrol I4
- Transmission: 4-speed manual

Dimensions
- Wheelbase: 2,330 mm (92 in)
- Length: 3,860 mm (152 in)
- Width: 1,720 mm (68 in)
- Height: 2,010 mm (79 in)

Chronology
- Successor: ARO 24 Series

The ARO M461 was an off-road vehicle built in post-World War II Romania by ARO from 1957 to 1975, as a licensed variant of the Soviet UAZ-69.

== IMS-57 ==
The first model was IMS-57, named by the factory initials (Intreprinderea Metalurgică de Stat) and the year it was released. A total of 914 vehicles were built between 1957 and 1959, mostly handcrafted. During World War II, on the site of a paper plant belonging to Letea company from Câmpulung-Muscel, the production of plane propellers and shooting equipment for airplanes produced by IAR Brașov was organized. After the production was abandoned, a group of workers begun building the first Romanian motorcycles in 1953. The design of the IMS-57 was based on the chassis and engine of the GAZ-67 but the body was from the GAZ-69. The 914 units of IMS-57 produced had the following characteristics: coachwork with two doors and tarpaulin, 3260 cc gasoline engine, 50 hp (37 kW) at 2,800 rpm, 80 km/h (50 mph), 24 L/100 km (12 mpg_{‑imp}; 9.8 mpg_{‑US}) consumption. As this engine was from the GAZ-67, it was derived from the 1920s Ford Model A engine. The construction was handicraft: the equipped chassis in functioning condition were tested on the route Câmpulung-Colibași where they were bodyworked, painted and finished in the Pitești factory UAP. The tin parts were made on wooden lasts. Among other oddities, the IMS-57 had manual windshield wipers.

== M59 ==
In 1959, the IMS-57 was replaced by M59, which was a substantial improvement over its predecessor. Launched two years later, the new type M59 signified a step forward compared to IMS-57: its engine had 56 hp (42 kW), a maximum speed enhanced to 90 km/h (56 mph), the manual windscreen wiper replaced with an electric one. The cars were bodyworked (2 doors, 4 doors or pick-up), painted and finished in Câmpulung. During the four years in production (1959–1963) the number of vehicles built jumped from 803 (1959) to 3,222 (1963).

== M461 ==
A new model, the M461, was started in 1964. The design was similar to the previous models but every panel was different and the cars are clearly distinguishable. It showed look and finishing improvements, and a redesigned mechanics. It had a new 2.5 liter four-cylinder engine. Its engine had four in-line cylinders, 70 hp (52 kW), a maximum speed of 100 km/h (62 mph), and a 17 L at 80 km/h (50 mph) consumption.

| Name | Capacity | Power | Torque |
|---|---|---|---|
| 2.5 Petrol | 2512 cc | 70 hp (52 kW) at 4000 rpm | 160 N⋅m (118 lb⋅ft) at 2500 rpm |

The export of M461 begun in 1965, to China and Colombia (2,000 pieces). The M461 was a very good performer for its time, having won a few international competitions: 1970 Forests Rally (Belgium), 1973 Sons of Beaches (Oregon). With improvements in their technology and performances, some 80,233 M461 land vehicles were produced by 1975, out of which 46,549 were exported and more were used by Romanian Army. About 3,000 M461s are still on the road in Romania, with a very active owners' club. Many of the cars were until recently used by the army. Late versions were known as M473 on the German market. It was eventually replaced by the ARO 24 Series vehicles.

== Gallery ==
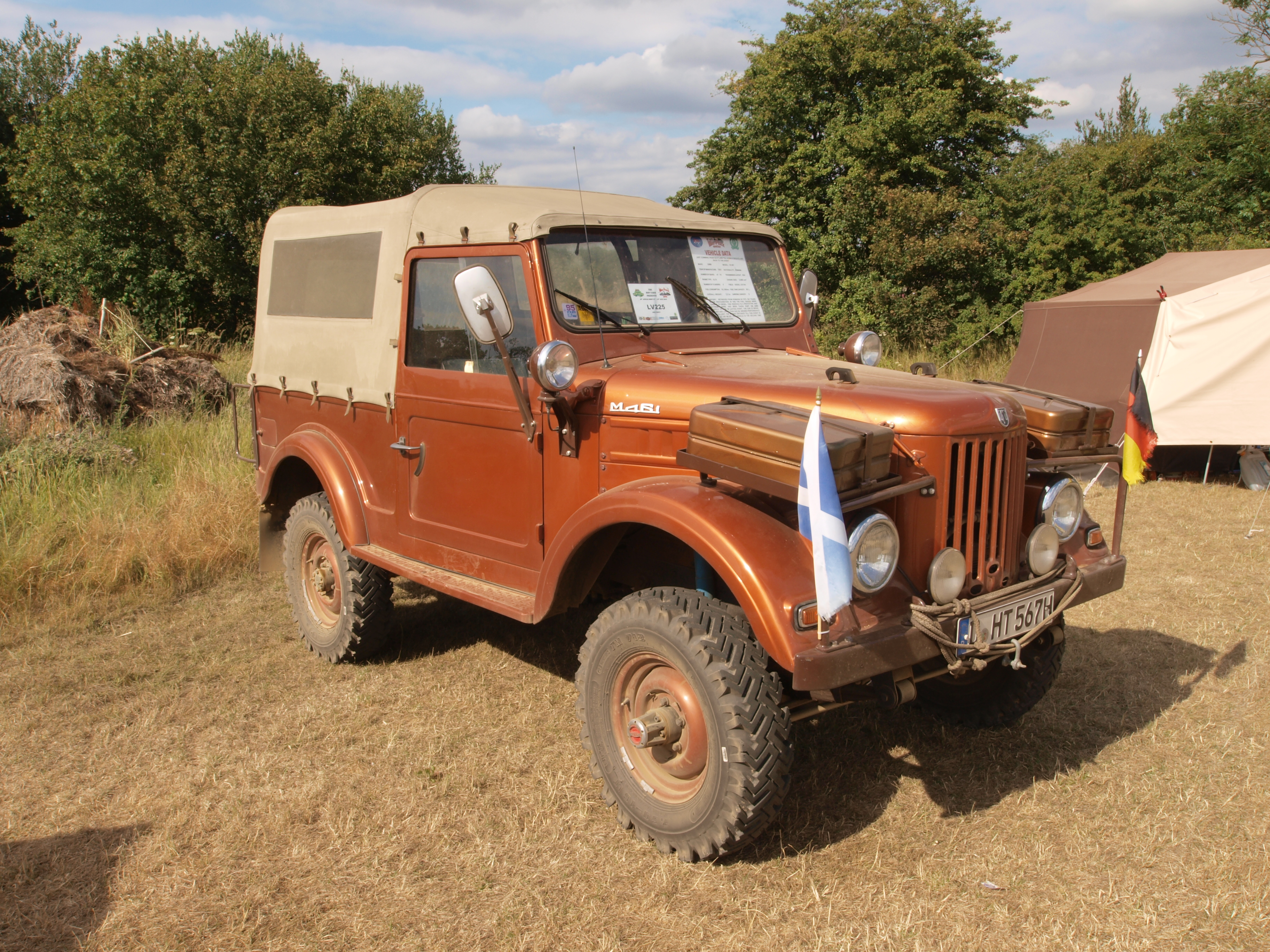
ARO M461 in DDR

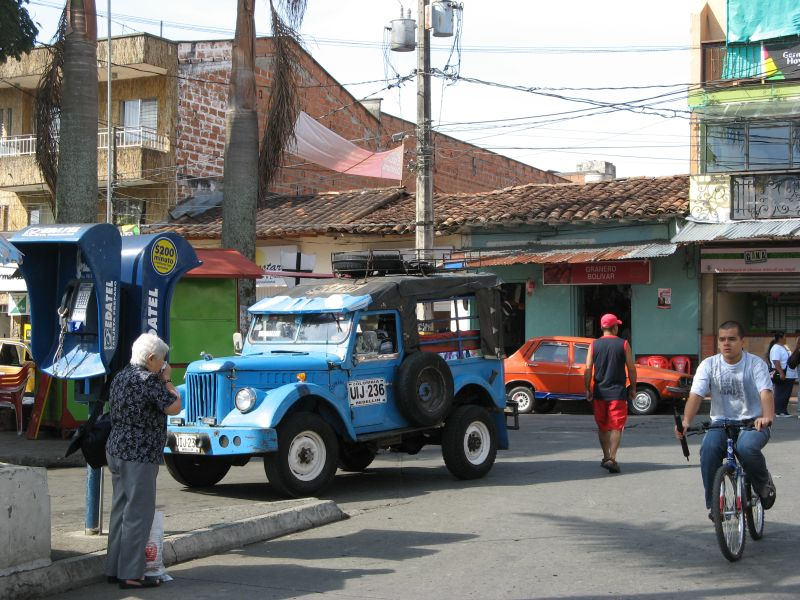
ARO M461 in Colombia

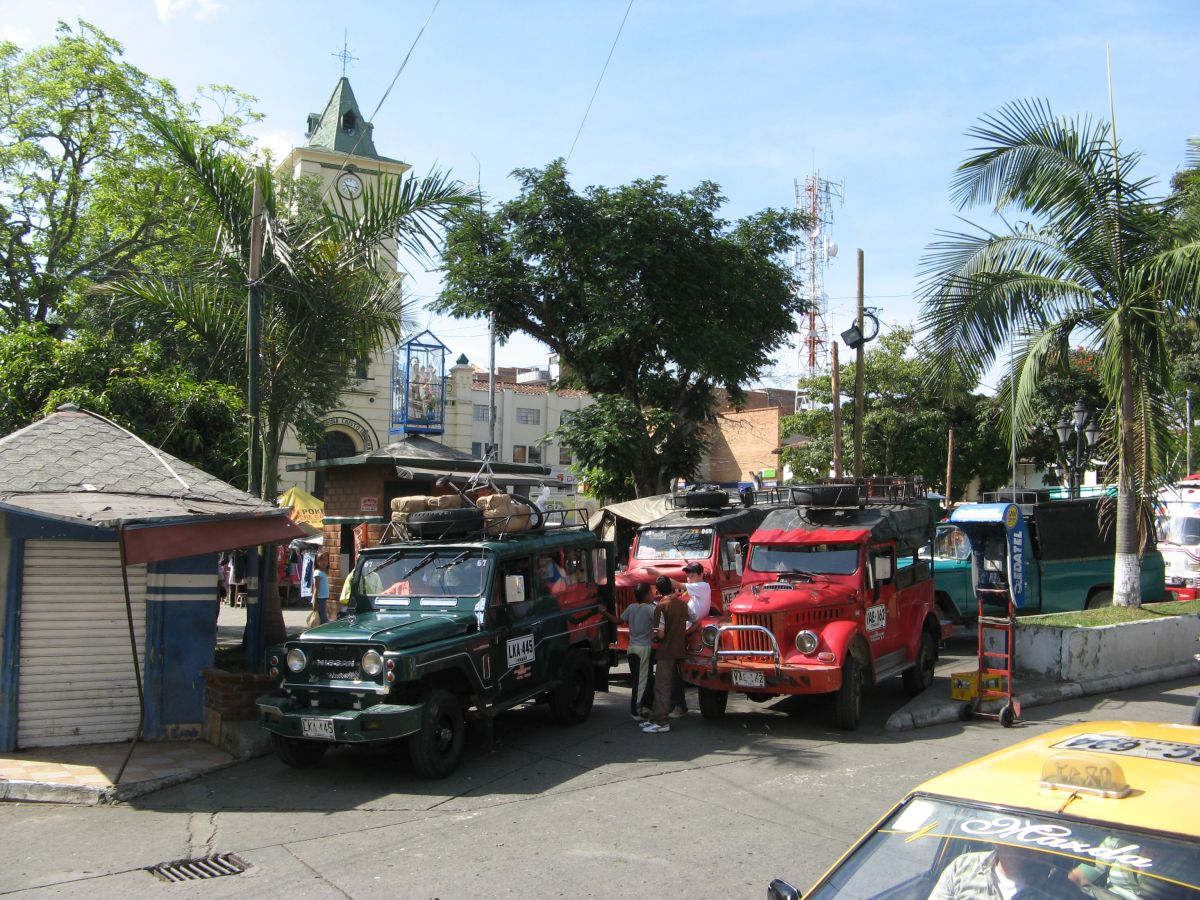
ARO M461 in Colombia

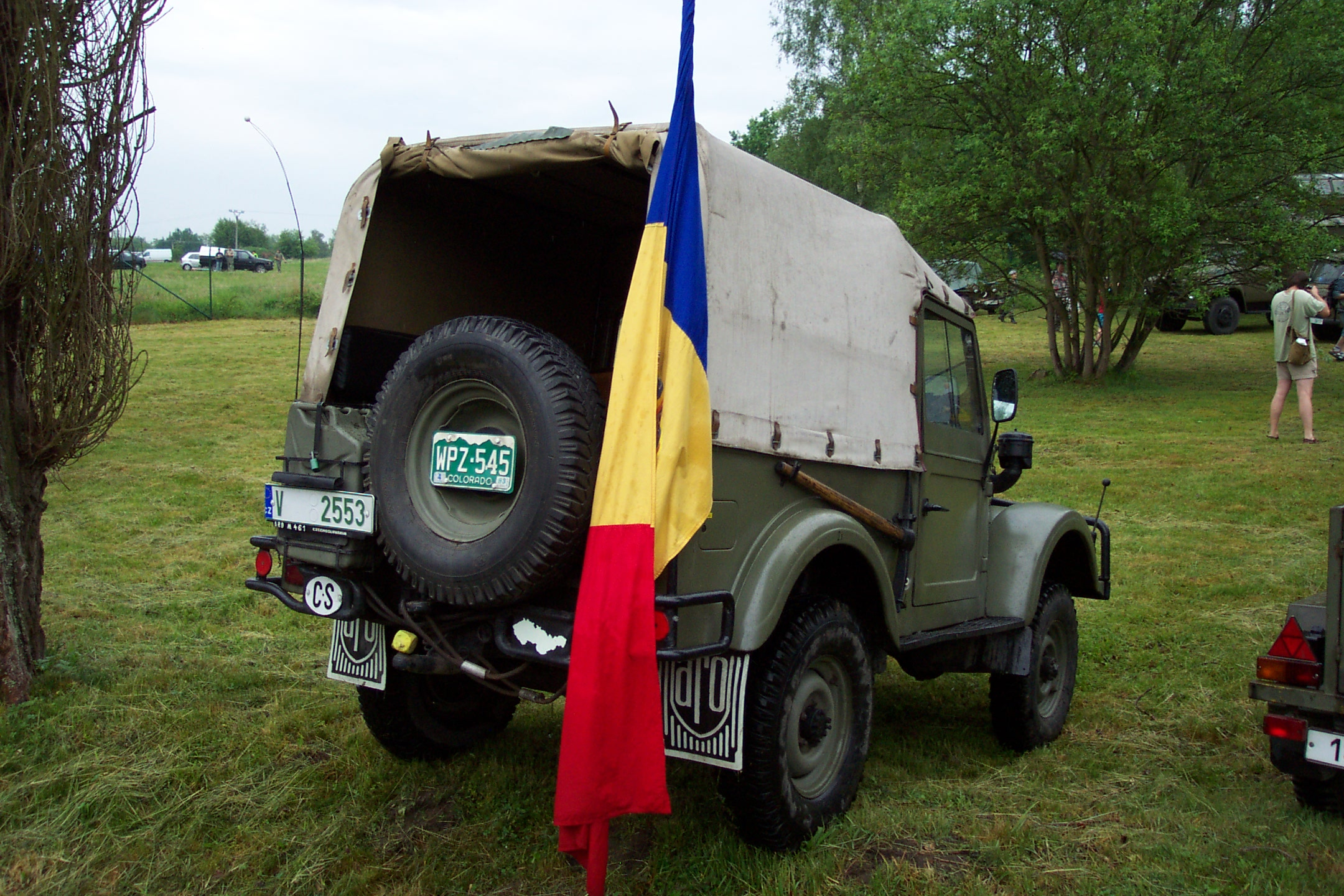
ARO M461 with the flag of socialist Romania

== See also ==
- ARO 10 Series
- ARO 24 Series
