= ARO 24 Series =

ARO 24/32 Series
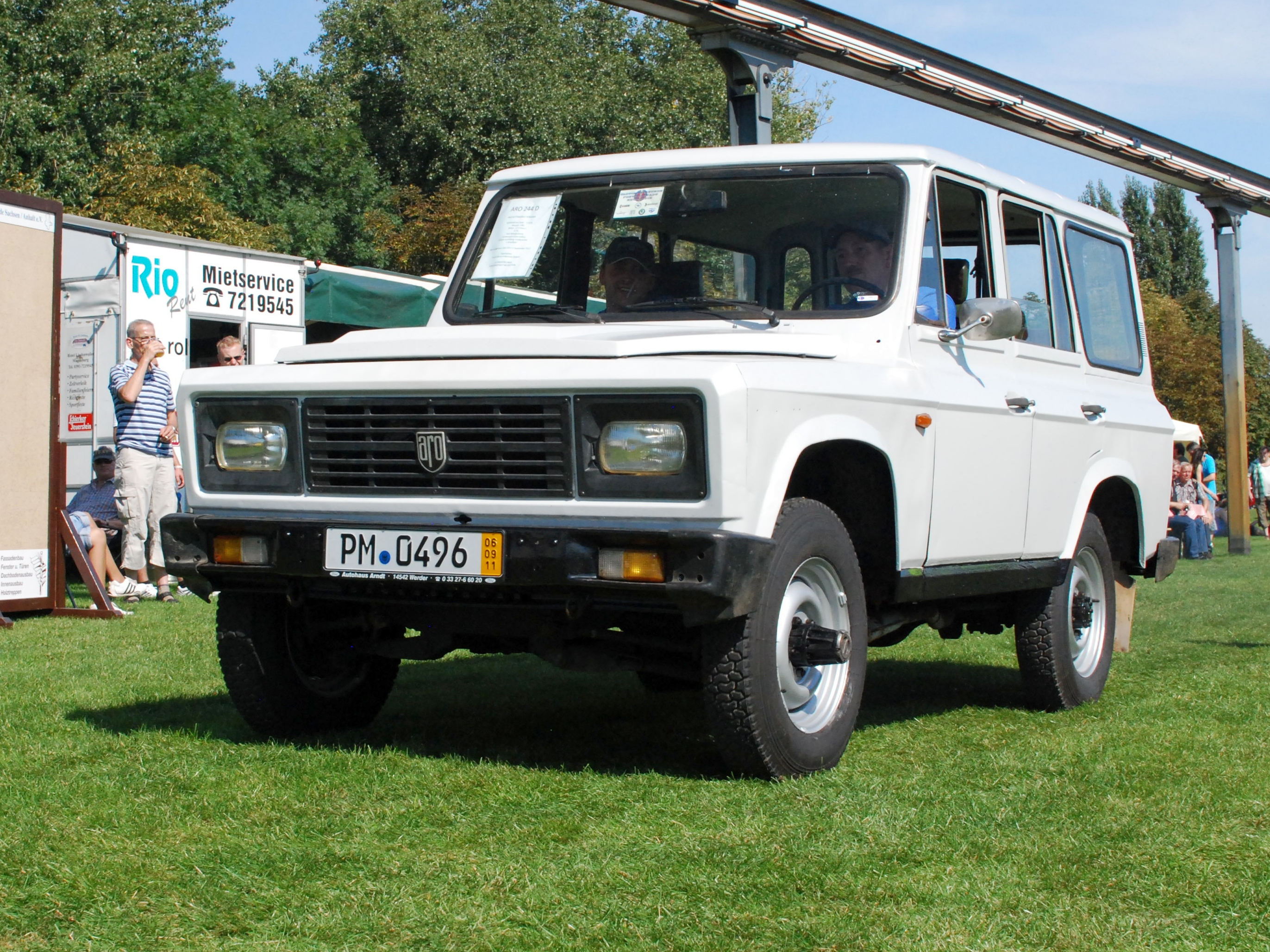

Overview
- Manufacturer: ARO
- Also called: Cross Lander 244X (Brazil)
- Production: 1969–2006 (Romania); 1975–1995 (Portugal); 1980–1990 (Spain); 2002–2006 (Brazil)
- Assembly: Romania: Câmpulung-Muscel; Portugal: Setúbal (Portaro:1975–1985); Portugal: Tramagal (Portaro: 1985–1995); Spain: Barcelona (HISPARO); Brazil: Manaus (Cross Lander)

Body and chassis
- Class: Off-road vehicle
- Body style: 2-door convertible 3-door SUV; 4-door SUV; 4-door convertible 5-door SUV; 2-door pickup 4-door pickup
- Layout: Front-engine, rear-wheel drive / Four-wheel drive
- Related: ARO 10

Powertrain
- Engine: Petrol/Diesel/Turbodiesel engines
- Transmission: 4-speed manual 5-speed manual 4-speed automatic

Dimensions
- Wheelbase: 2,350–4,200 mm (93–165 in)
- Length: 4,098–6,410 mm (161.3–252.4 in)
- Width: 1,775–2,100 mm (69.9–82.7 in)
- Height: 1,840–2,900 mm (72–114 in)
- Curb weight: 1,650–2,000 kg (3,640–4,410 lb)

Chronology
- Predecessor: ARO M461

The ARO 24 Series is a 4x4 off-road vehicle manufactured by ARO from 1969 to 2006 and mass produced from 1972.

ARO 240 was the first of the ARO 24 series, which eventually included many other models: the four-door 241 and 244, the 242 pick-up, the three-door 243, the 320, 330 pick-ups, and many other body trims. Last special military versions were called ARO Dragon.

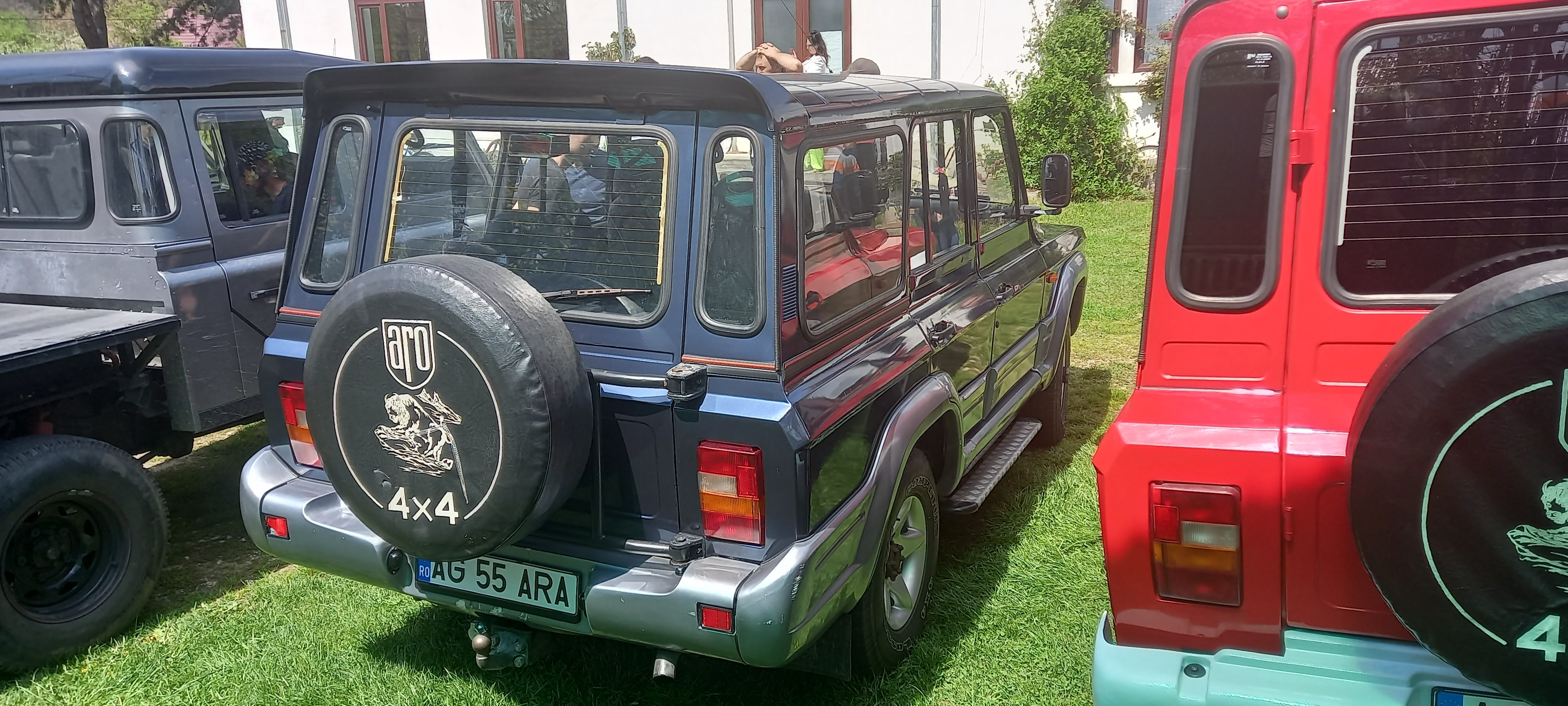
ARO 244 (1998 revision)-rear view

It is equipped with many different engines (both diesel and petrol options), and comes in both 4x2 and 4x4 versions. Notable improvements over the years were the introduction of Romanian Diesel engines, units equipped with Toyota engines, and units equipped with Romanian-built Turbo Diesel engines. The ARO-24s are no longer in production, as ARO was shut down.

Plans to market the ARO 244 in the United States as the Cross Lander 244X in 2005 were eventually cancelled. During the 1970s, 1980s and 1990s the original Romanian ARO 4X4 Series were also produced under alternative names, often with modified running gear depending on the export market. In Portugal, they were assembled in Setúbal south of Lisbon and locally known there as the PORTARO 4X4, in Spain they were called HISPARO 4X4, with a reshaped bodyshell and better equipped.

== Engines ==
=== Petrol engines ===
Name	Capacity	Type	Power	Torque
2.4 2RZ-FE	2438 cc	Toyota	140 PS (103 kW) at 5000 rpm	212 N⋅m (156 lb⋅ft) at 4000 rpm
2.5 205HX	2469 cc	Chrysler	120 PS (88 kW) at 5250 rpm	190 N⋅m (140 lb⋅ft) at 3500 rpm
2.5 L25	2495 cc	ARO	83 PS (61 kW) at 4200 rpm	170 N⋅m (125 lb⋅ft) at 3000 rpm
2.5 M-207	2512 cc	ARO	67 PS (49 kW) at 4000 rpm	160 N⋅m (118 lb⋅ft) at 2500 rpm
2.9 V6	2935 cc	Ford	145 PS (107 kW) at 5500 rpm	225 N⋅m (166 lb⋅ft) at 3500 rpm
3.0 L30	3007 cc	ARO	95 PS (70 kW) at 4000 rpm	196 N⋅m (145 lb⋅ft) at 3000 rpm
4.0 V6	3958 cc	Ford	165 PS (121 kW) at 4400 rpm	316 N⋅m (233 lb⋅ft) at 2400 rpm
2.9 V6 24V	2932 cc	Cosworth	207 PS (152 kW) at 5250 rpm	320 N⋅m (236 lb⋅ft) at 3000 rpm

=== Diesel engines ===
Name	Capacity	Type	Power	Torque
Andoria 2.4, 4C90 (cylinder diameter = 90 mm, Ricardo Comet V swirl chamber)	2417 cc	Andoria 4C90 Diesel Indirect injection 4CT90Turbodiesel; 4CTi90 Turbodiesel	69 PS (51 kW) at 4200 rpm 90 PS (66 kW) at 4100 rpm 101 PS (74 kW) at 4100 rpm	147 N⋅m (108 lb⋅ft) at 2500 rpm 195 N⋅m (144 lb⋅ft) at 2200 rpm 230 N⋅m (170 lb⋅ft) at 2000-2500 rpm
2.4 2L-T	2446 cc	Toyota; Turbodiesel	86 PS (63 kW) at 4000 rpm	188 N⋅m (139 lb⋅ft) at 2200 rpm
2.5 XD3	2498 cc	Peugeot	75 PS (55 kW) at 4500 rpm	147 N⋅m (108 lb⋅ft) at 2500 rpm
2.5 XD3T	2498 cc	Peugeot; Turbodiesel	95 PS (70 kW) at 4150 rpm	205 N⋅m (151 lb⋅ft) at 2500 rpm
2.5 L4 OHV	2499 cc	VM; Turbodiesel	101 PS (74 kW) at 4200 rpm	232 N⋅m (171 lb⋅ft) at 2200 rpm
2.7 L27	2660 cc	ARO	68 PS (50 kW) at 3800 rpm	138 N⋅m (102 lb⋅ft) at 2250 rpm
2.7 DX-28	2660 cc	ARO	71 PS (52 kW) at 3900 rpm	152 N⋅m (112 lb⋅ft) at 2250 rpm
2.7 TDX-28	2660 cc	ARO; Turbodiesel	87 PS (64 kW) at 3500 rpm	191 N⋅m (141 lb⋅ft) at 1900 rpm
3.1 D127	3119 cc	UTB	68 PS (50 kW) at 3200 rpm	185 N⋅m (136 lb⋅ft) at 1600 rpm

== Versions ==
=== Off-road vehicles ===
- ARO 240, a 2-door soft-top cabriolet;
- ARO 241, a 4-door soft top cabriolet;
- ARO 243, a 3-door model with 8 seats;
- ARO 244, a 5-door model with 5 seats;
- ARO 246, a 5-door model with 7 seats.

=== Light commercial vehicles ===
- ARO 242, a single cab pick-up truck with short bed integrated to the body;
- ARO 320, a single cab pick-up truck;
- ARO 324, a double cab pick-up truck;
- ARO 328 Maxi;
- ARO 330, an extended single cab pick-up truck;

=== Other Versions ===
ARO produced an extensive and special variety of body styles:

- 263 (8 seats, 3 doors; model based on the 243 version with the wheelbase increased from 2350 mm to 2600 mm);
- 264 (5 seats, 4 doors; model based on the 244 version with the wheelbase increased from 2350 mm to 2600 mm);
- 266 (7 seats, 5 doors; model based on the 246 version with the wheelbase increased to 2600 mm);
- 323 Sanitară (Ambulance with a raised roof over the passenger compartment from the B-pillar back);
- 338 TC;
- 35S (ambulance with a wheelbase of 3500 mm);
- 429 TC/TP (TC=Children Transportation, TP=Public Transportation).
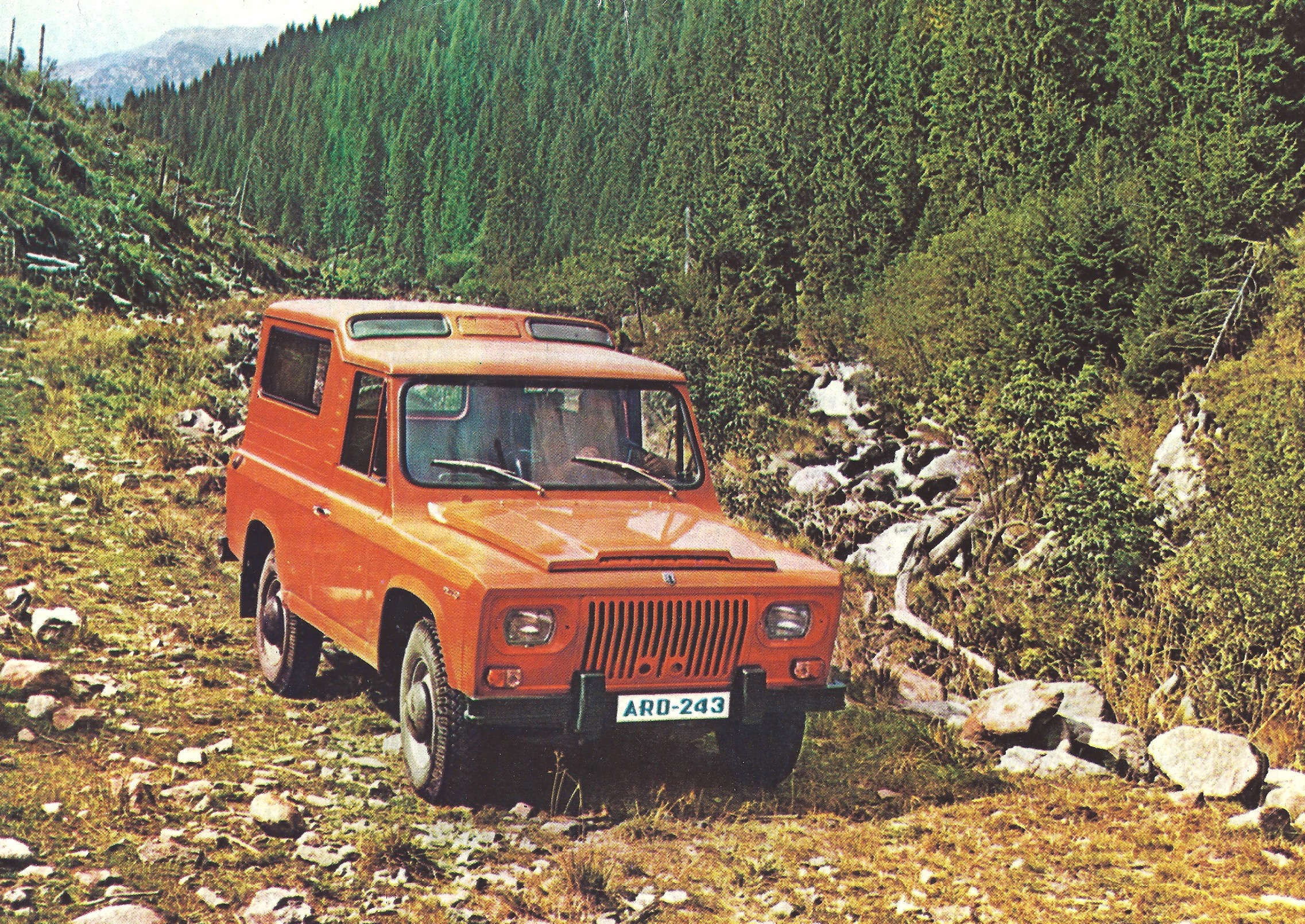
ARO 243 van

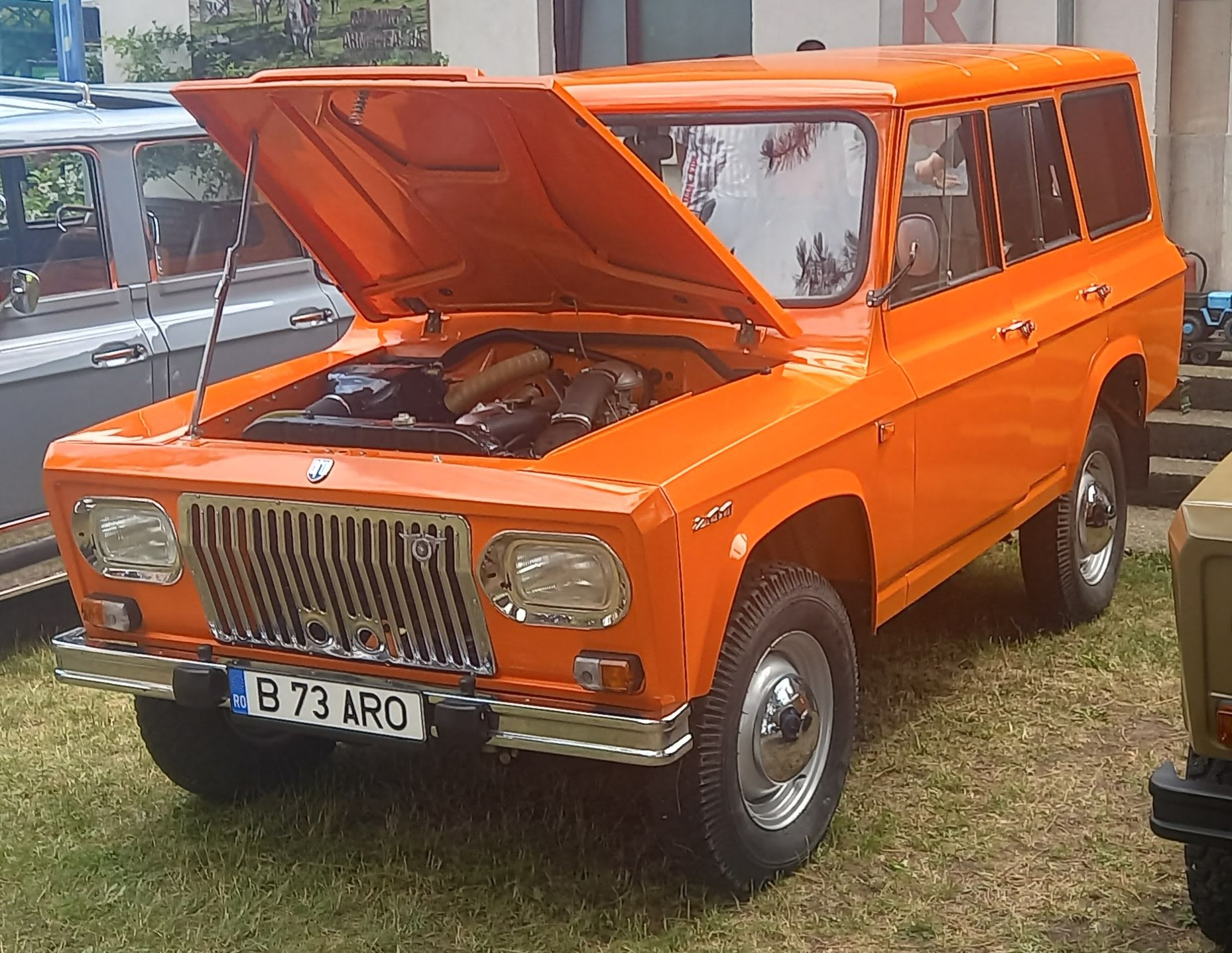
ARO 244 (first example built)-front view

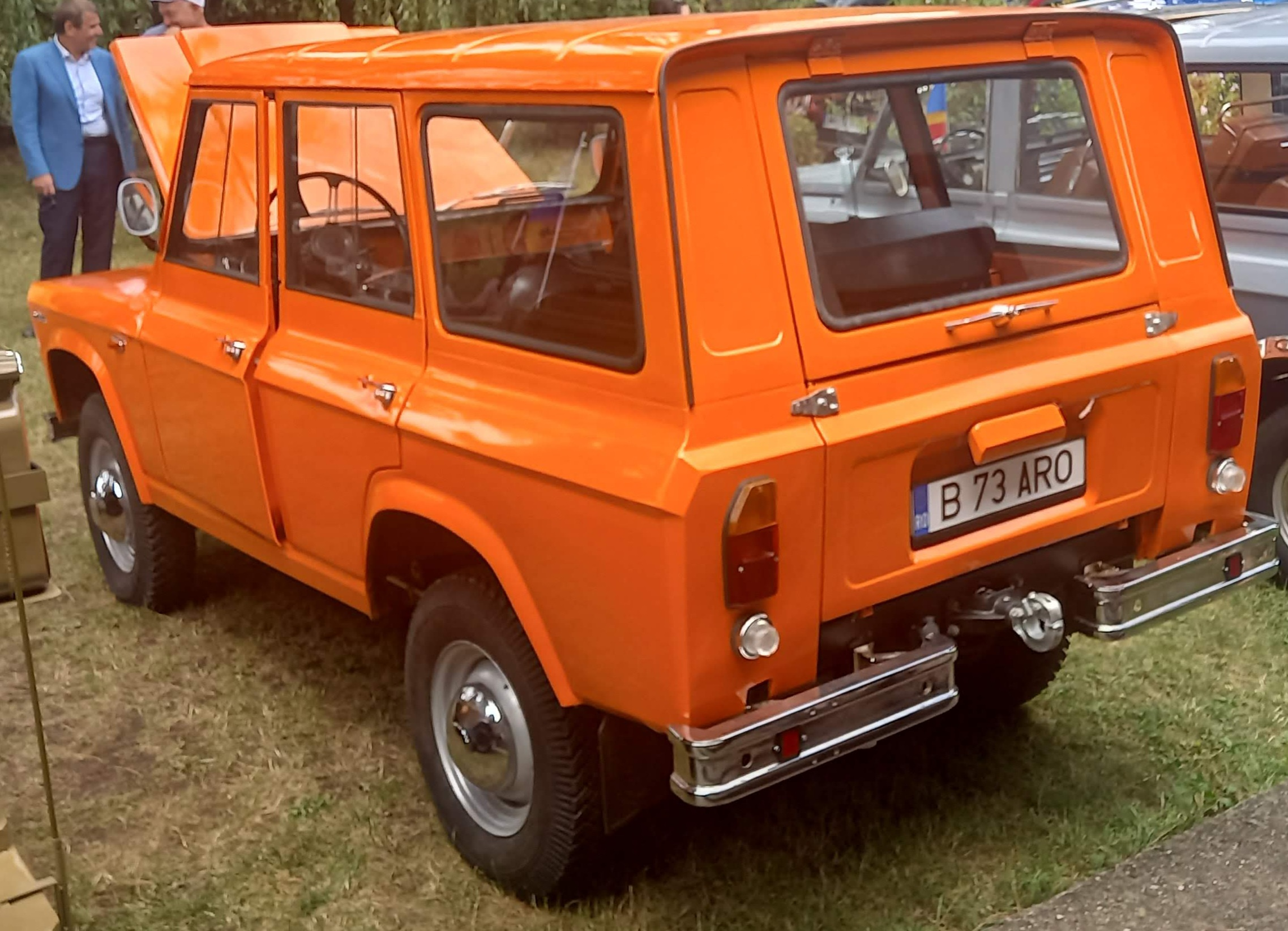
ARO 244 (first example built)-rear view

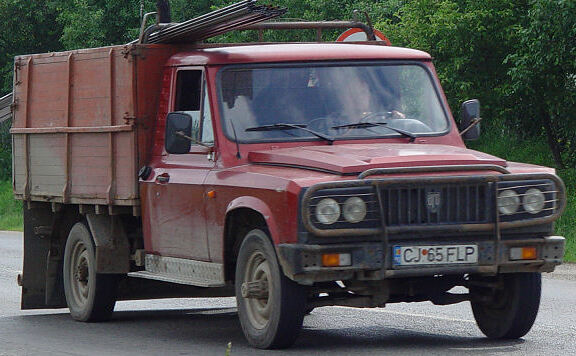
ARO 320 Pickup/flatbed

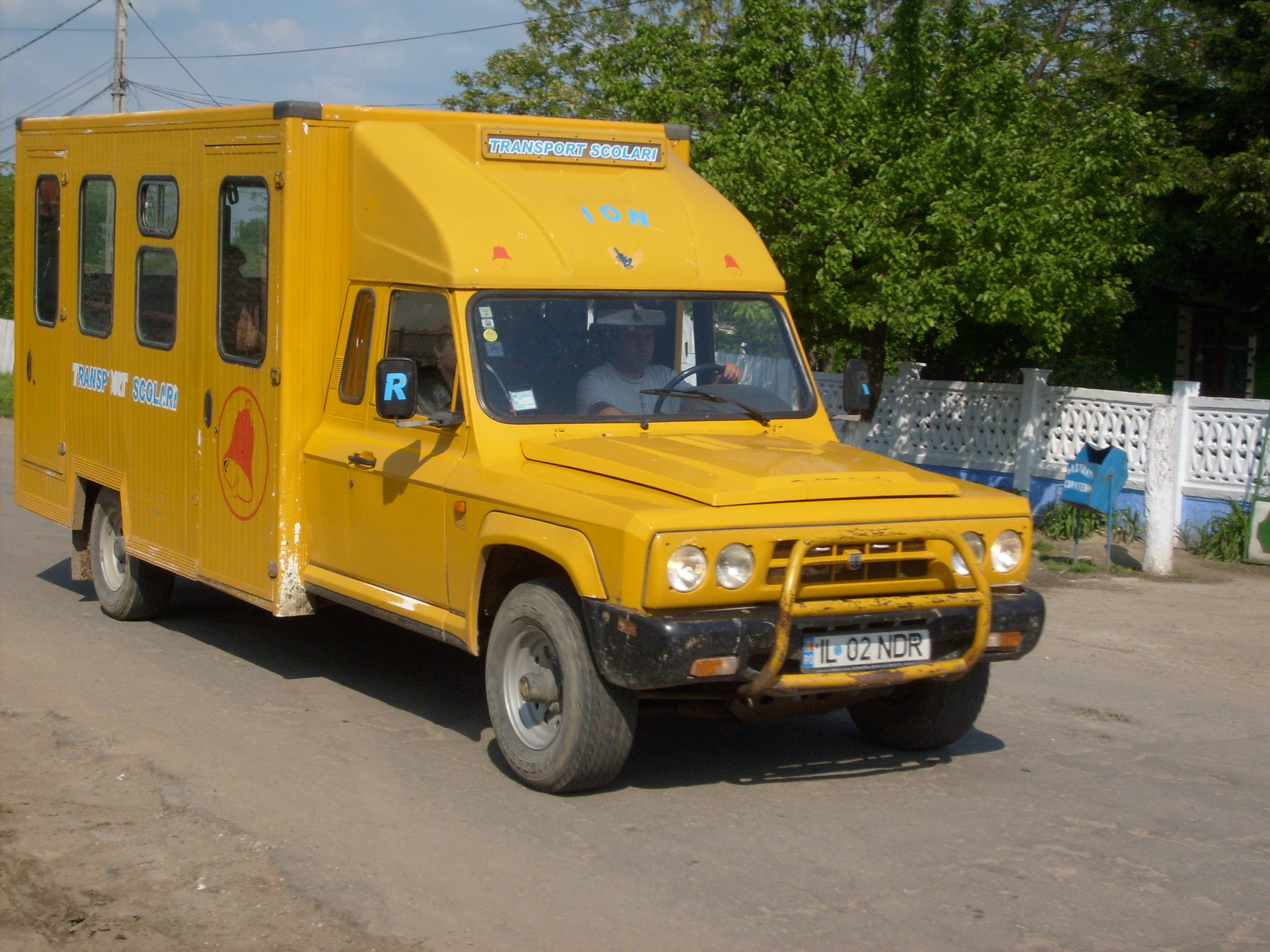
ARO 429 TC School Bus

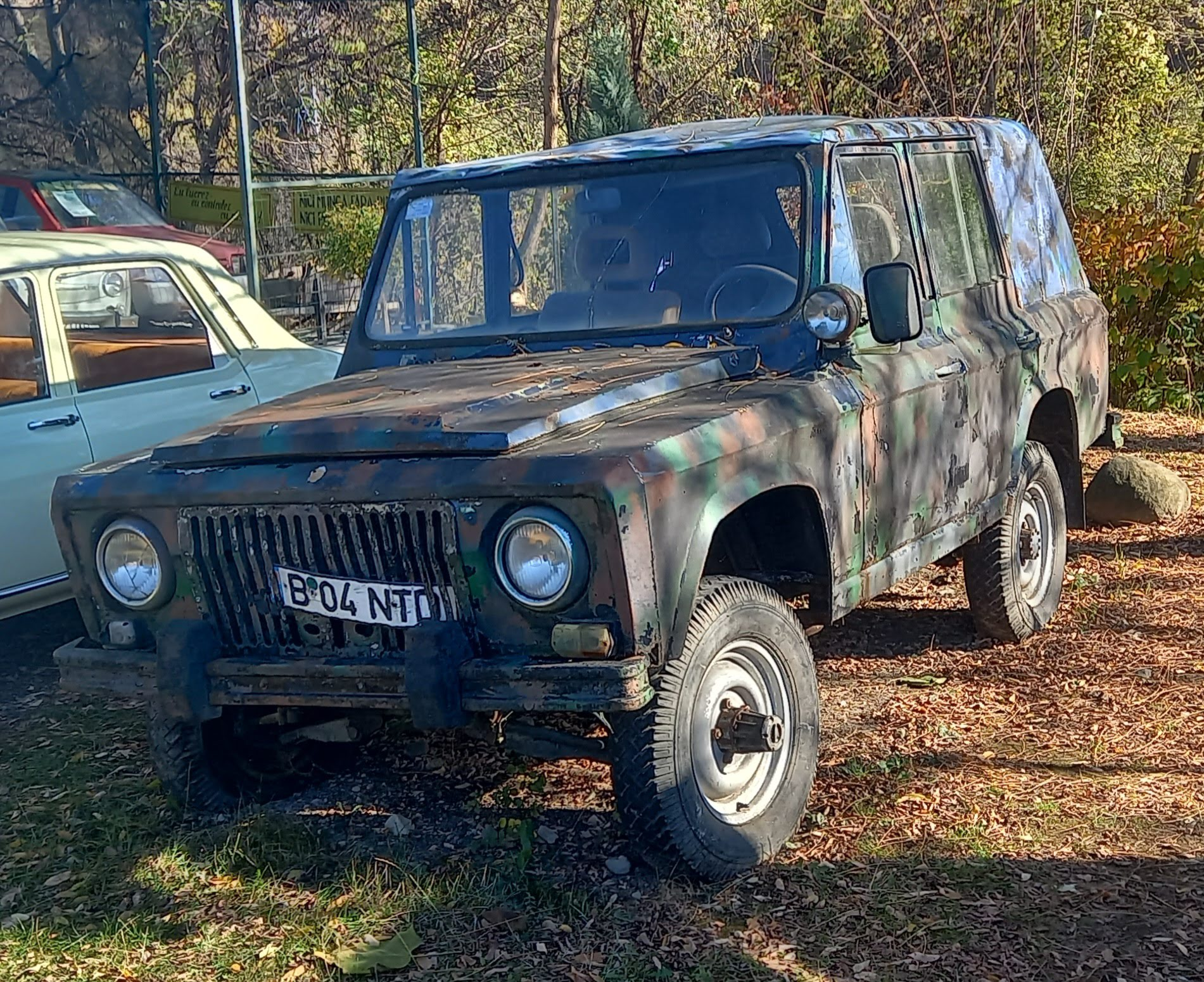
ARO 241 (1977 revision)

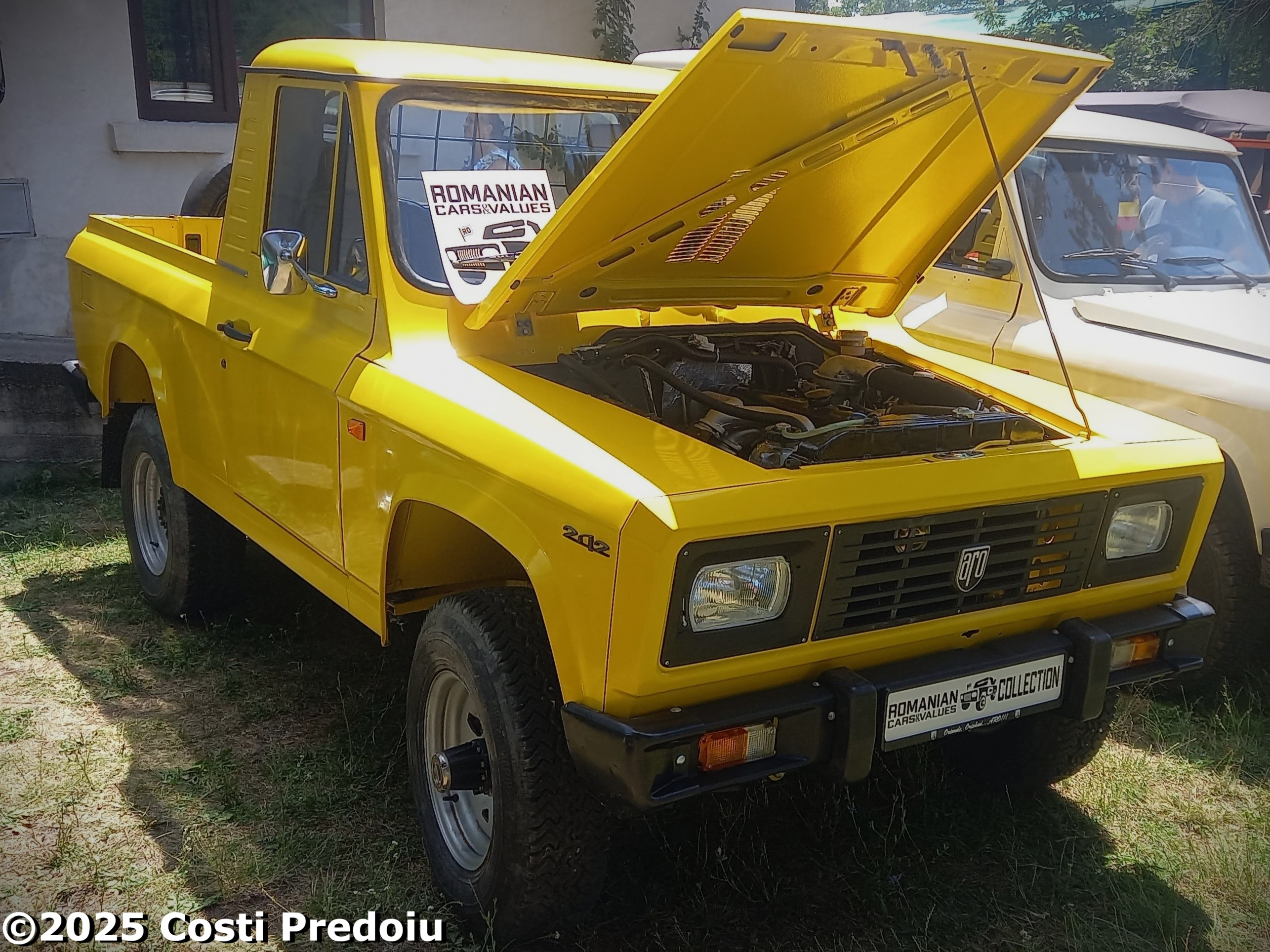
ARO 242 (second facelift)

=== ARO Dragon ===
While ARO 24 series were used by the Romanian military, a military specific version called the ARO Dragon was designed and built. The ARO Dragon featured a simplified flat paneled body and came in several variants to include an armored variant.

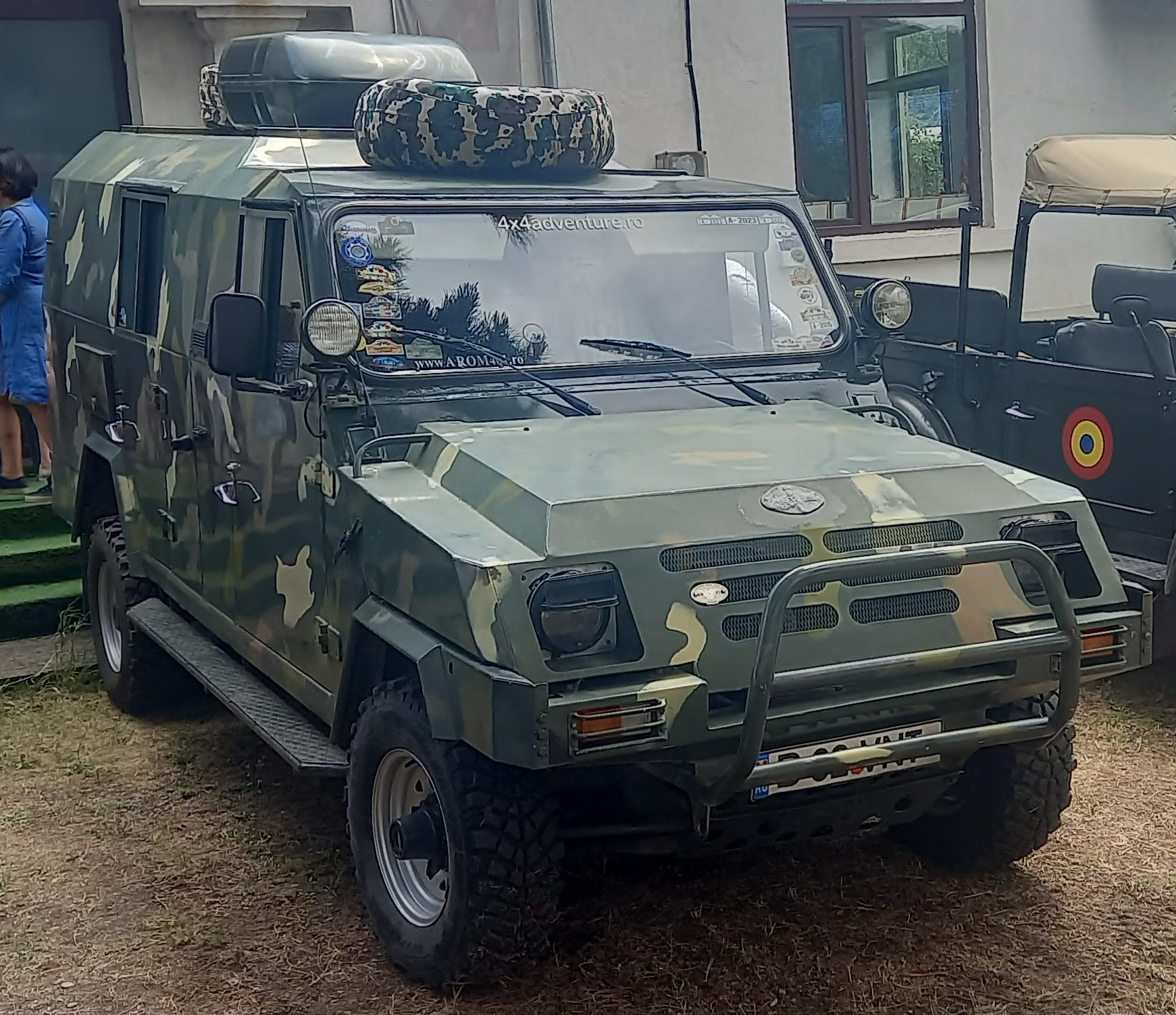
ARO Dragon (military version)

The ARO Dragon Civil was a civilian version of the Dragon.

== Revisions ==
The first generation of ARO 24, between 1972 and 1976, had Dacia 1300 headlights and round taillights similar to the ARO M461. From 1977, round headlights were used like in the IMS and the rear lights were restyled. In 1985, a new front grille and smaller round headlights were introduced. Also, they were available with double headlights, that were used mostly on the 244. In 1995, the double headlight front design was slightly restyled, and the rear lights were used Oltcit Club lamps. The last restyling, in 1998, was a slight facelift of the previous model and it introduced the so-called Toyota-type ornaments.

== Gallery ==
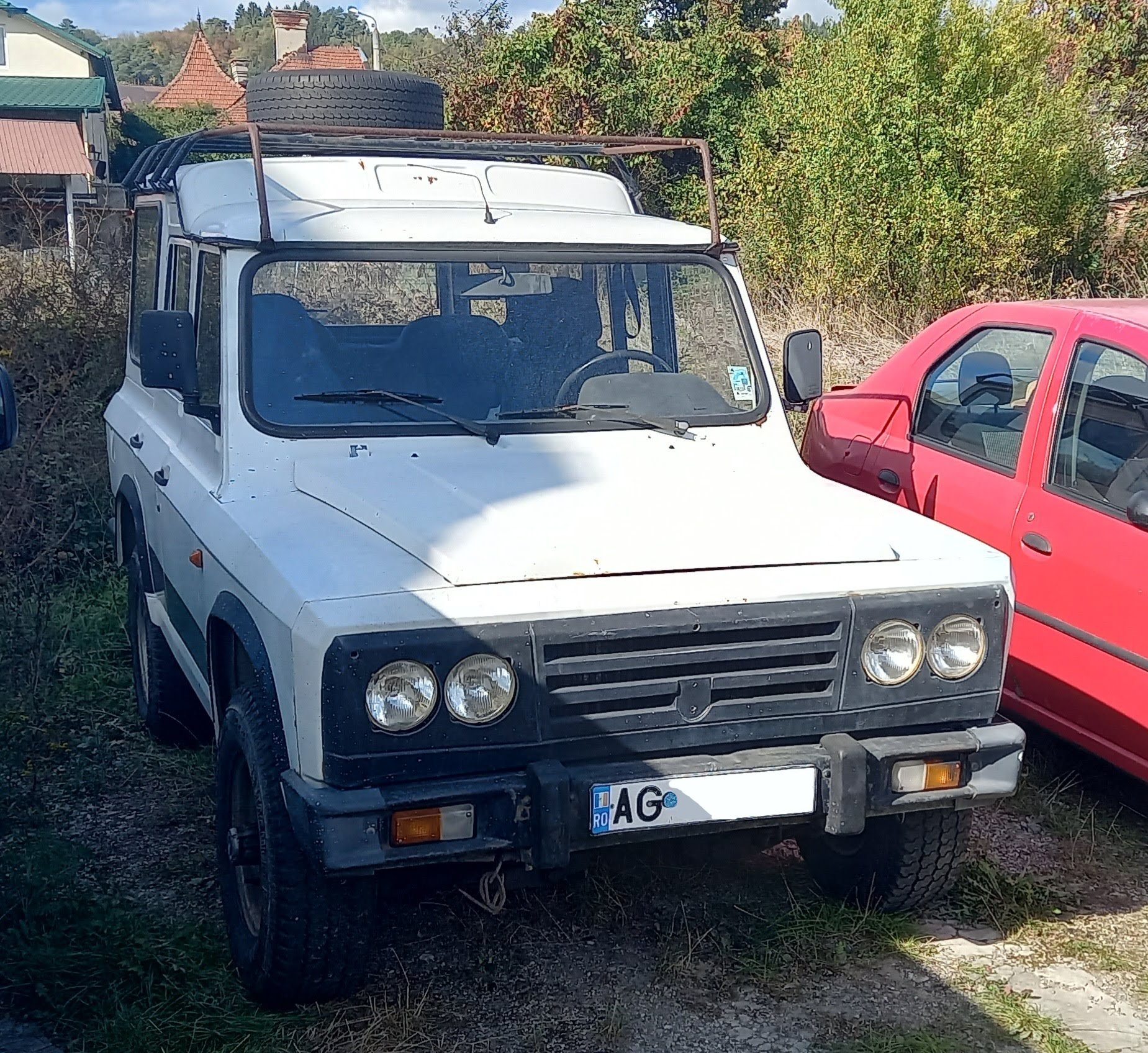
ARO 246 (1995 facelift)

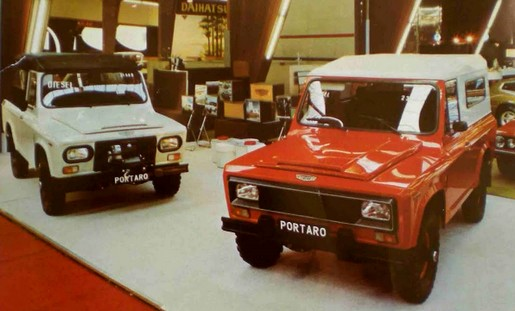
PORTARO 240 and 260

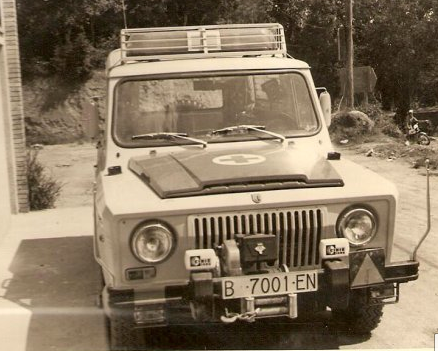
Aro 243 High altitude rescue 4WD ambulance of the Alpine Motor Unit of the Red Cross, Barcelona

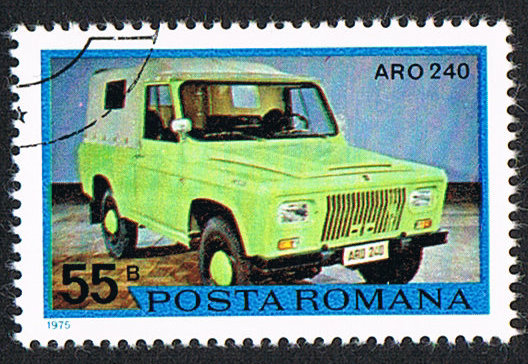
Romanian stamp from 1975 with ARO 240

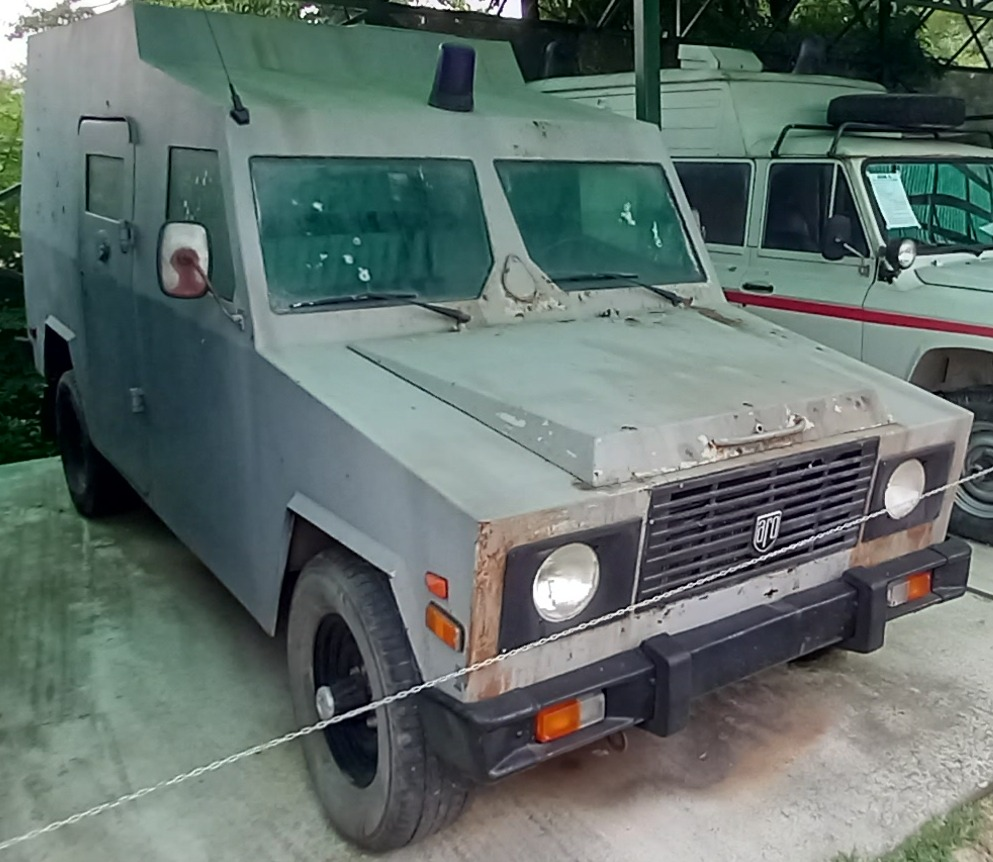
The Transport Valori (Value Transporter). The technical data is unknown and only 8 units were built. security van

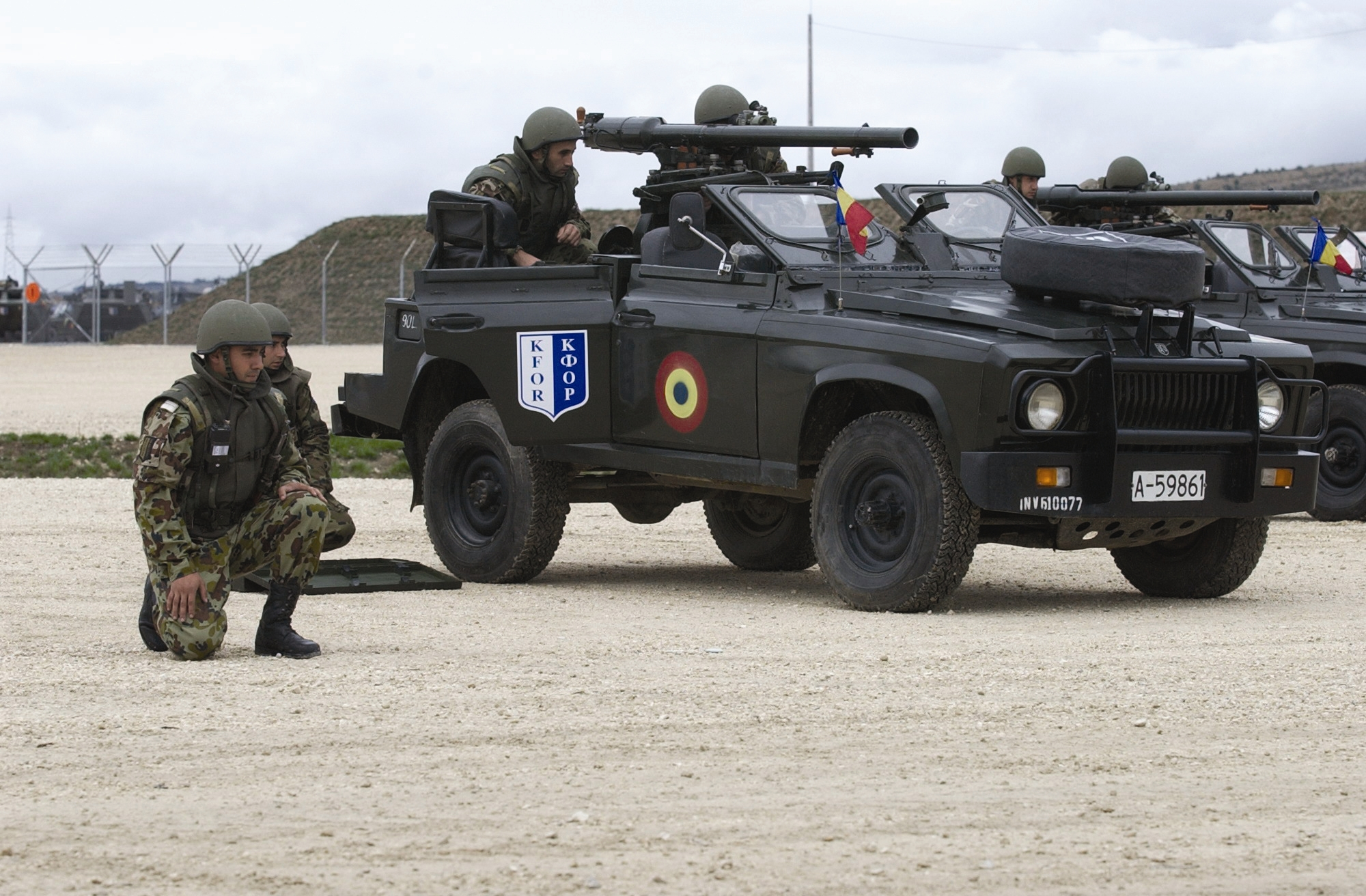
ARO 241 part of KFOR with an AG-9 mounted on it, 2003

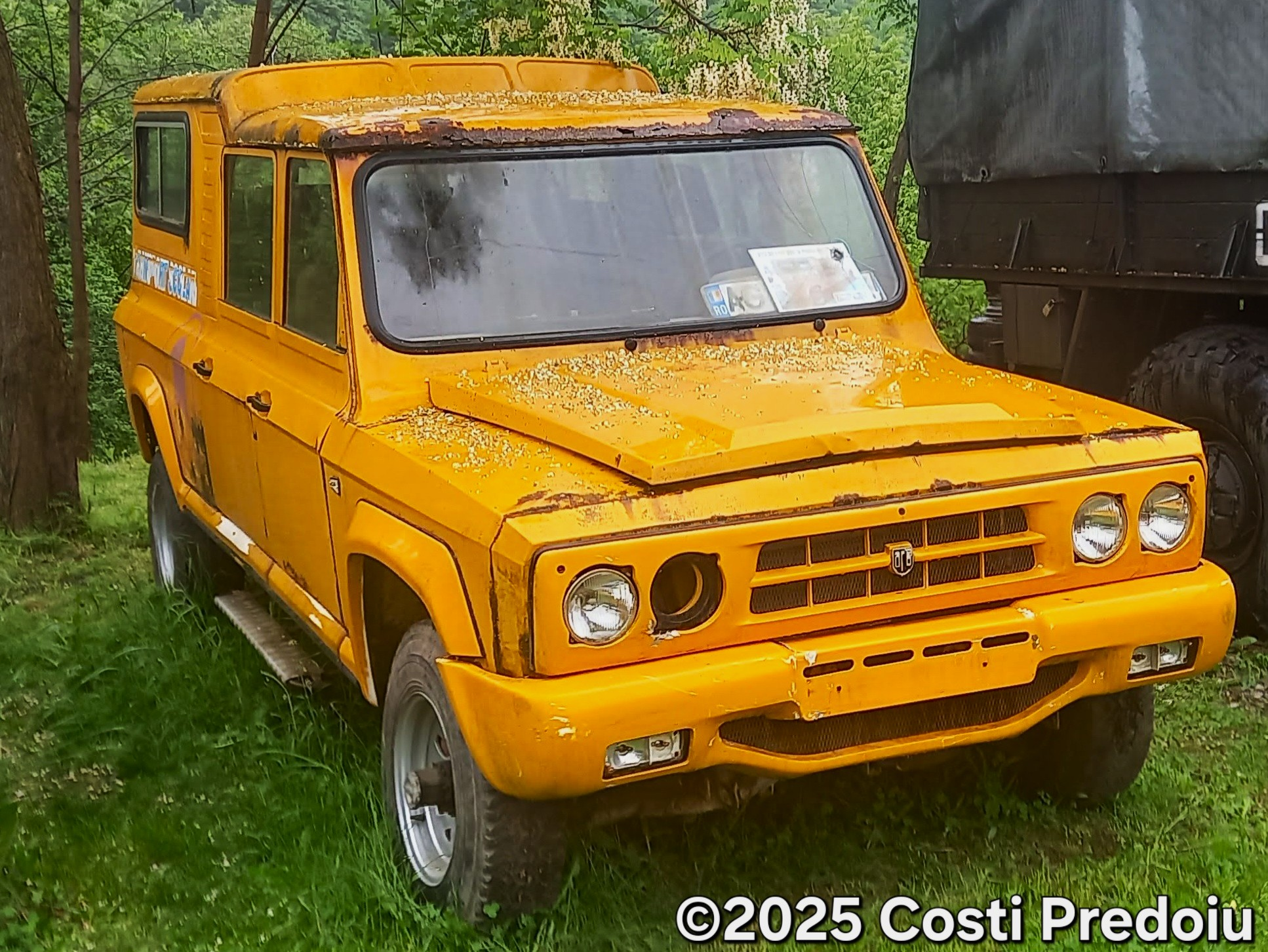
ARO 338 TC (1998-2006) (TC=Transport Copii/Child Transportation)

== See also ==
- ARO M461
- ARO 10 Series
