= Share taxi =

Type of vehicle for hire

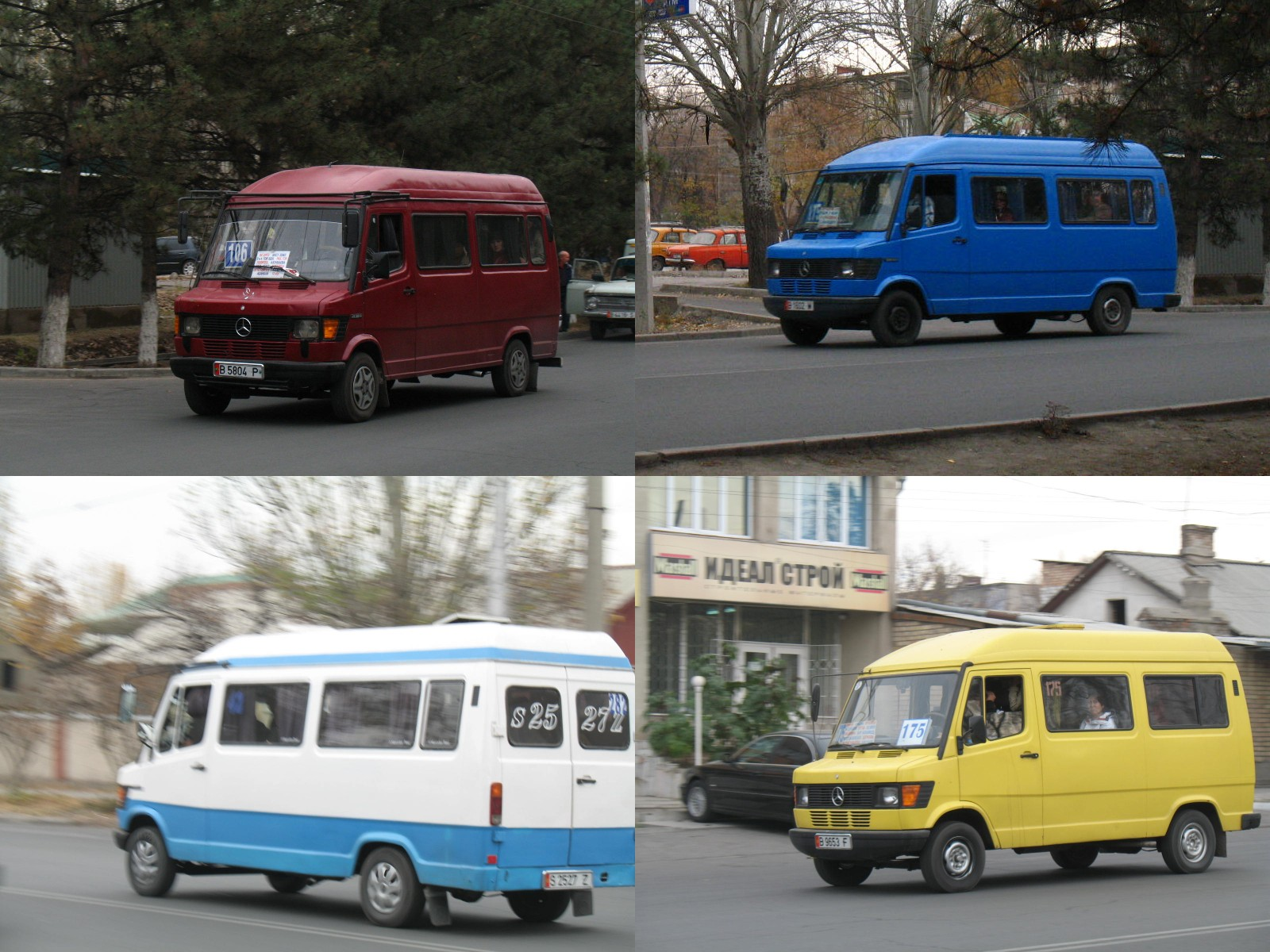
Four marshrutkas in Bishkek, Kyrgyzstan

A share taxi, shared taxi, taxibus, or jitney or dollar van in the US, marshrutka in former Soviet countries, a sherut in Israel, or a minibus in some European countries, is a mode of transport which falls between a taxicab and a bus. Share taxis, when not fully formalised, are a form of paratransit. They are vehicles for hire and are typically smaller than buses. Share taxis usually take passengers on a fixed or semi-fixed route without timetables, sometimes only departing when all seats are filled. They may stop anywhere to pick up or drop off their passengers. They are most common in developing countries and inner cities.

The vehicles used as share taxis range from four-seat cars to minibuses, midibuses, covered pickup trucks, station wagons, and trucks. Certain vehicle types may be better-suited than others. They are often owner-operated.

One of the reasons for the widespread use of share taxis in locations like Jakarta in Indonesia or Manila in the Philippines is lack of public transportation of other kinds. An increase in bus fares usually leads to a significant rise in usage of pocket-friendly share taxis. Market-oriented economists and policy analysts have argued for liberalizing entry as an alternative to subsidized public transit, a case made in Ross Eckert and George Hilton's study of the early American jitney industry and in later Reason Foundation work by Peter Gordon and Harry Richardson. Concerns over passenger safety, insurance liability and enforcement have limited legislative support.

Some share taxi services are forms of demand-responsive transport and include shared shuttle bus service to airports. Some can be booked online using mobile apps.

== Operation ==
=== Terminus ===
A given share taxi route may start and finish in fixed central locations, and landmarks may serve as route names or route termini. In other places there may be no formal termini, with taxis simply congregating at a central location, instead. The term "rank" denotes an area, specifically built for taxi operators by a municipality or city, where commuters may start and end their journey.

=== Route ===
Where they exist, shared taxis provide service on set routes within and sometimes between towns. After a shared taxi has picked up passengers at its terminus, it proceeds along a semi-fixed route where the driver may determine the actual route within an area according to traffic conditions. Drivers will stop anywhere to allow riders to disembark, and may sometimes do the same when prospective passengers want to ride.

=== Vehicle ownership ===
Most share taxis are operated under one of two regimes. Some share taxis are operated by a company. For example, in Dakar there are company-owned fleets of hundreds of car rapides. In the Soviet Union, share taxis, known as marshrutka, were operated by state-owned taxi parks. There are also individual operators in many countries. In Africa, while there are company share taxis, individual owners are more common. Rarely owning more than two vehicles at a time, they will rent out a minibus to operators, who pay fuel and other running costs, and keep revenue.

==== Syndicates ====
In some places, like some African cities and also Hong Kong, share taxi minibuses are overseen by syndicates, unions, or route associations. These groups often function in the absence of a regulatory environment and may collect dues or fees from drivers (such as per-use terminal payments, sometimes illegally), set routes, manage terminals, and fix fares. Terminal management may include ensuring each vehicle leaves with a full load of passengers.

Because the syndicates represent owners, their regulatory efforts tend to favor operators rather than passengers, and the very termini syndicates upkeep can cost delays and money for passengers as well as forcing them to disembark at inconvenient locations, in a phenomenon called "terminal constraint".

== By location ==
=== Africa ===
Some Francophone African countries use the term taxi-brousse ('bush taxi', often spelled with a space rather than a hyphen in English) for share taxis.

In some African cities, routes are run between formal termini, where the majority of passengers board. In these places, the share taxis wait for a full load of passengers prior to departing, and off-peak wait times may be in excess of an hour.

In Africa, regulation is mainly something that pertains to the vehicle itself not its operator or its mode of operation.

African minibuses are difficult to tax, and may operate in a "regulatory vacuum" perhaps because their existence is not part of a government scheme, but is simply a market response to a growing demand for such services. Route syndicates and operator's associations often exercise unrestricted control, and existing rules may see little enforcement.

In many traffic-choked, sprawling, and low-density African cities, minibuses are used. Some or even most African bush taxis are old Peugeot and Renault models. (specifically Peugeot 504 and Peugeot 505 models).

==== Algeria ====
In Algeria, taxis collectifs ply fixed routes with their destination displayed. Rides are shared with others who are picked up along the way, and the taxi will leave only when it seats all the passengers it can. While stations, set locations to board and disembark, exist, prospective passengers flag down a taxi collectif when they want a ride.

Operating inter- and intra-city, taxis collectifs that travel between towns may be called interwilaya taxis.

Along with all forms of public transport in Algeria, the Foreign Affairs and International Trade Canada recommend against using these share taxis. The Irish Department of Foreign Affairs asks that you use taxis recommended by a hotel.

==== Burkina Faso ====
In Ouagadougou, capital of Burkina Faso, the share taxi or taxi brousse role is not filled by the traditional African minibus.

==== Cameroon ====
Share taxis do exist in Cameroon, but as of 2008 minibuses cannot be used for this purpose, by law. That same year, Douala, Cameroon, also was without an independent transport authority.

==== Democratic Republic of the Congo ====
Those in Kinshasa, DRC, (or perhaps just the Kongo people) may call share taxis fula fula meaning "quick quick".

There was no independent transport authority in the city of Kinshasa as of 2008.

==== Egypt ====
Egyptian share cabs are generally known as micro-bus (mekrobass ميكروباص or mašrūʿ مشروع, "project"; plural mekrobassāt ميكروباصات or mašarīʿ مشاريع). The second name is used by Alexandrians.

Micro-buses are licensed by each of the governorates of Egypt as taxicabs, and are generally operated privately by their drivers. Although each governorate attempts to maintain a consistent paint scheme for them, in practice the color of them varies wildly, as the "consistent" schemes have changed from time to time and many drivers have not bothered to repaint their cars.

Rates vary depending on distance traveled, although these rates are generally well known to those riding the micro-bus. The fares also depend on the city. Riders can typically hail micro-buses from any point along the route, often with well-established hand signals indicating the prospective rider's destination, although certain areas tend to be well-known micro-bus stops.

Like the Eastern European marshrutka, a typical micro-bus is a large van, most often a Toyota HiAce or its Jinbei equivalent, the Haise, and the latter is produced by the Bavarian Auto Manufacturing Group in 6th of October City in Egypt. Smaller vans and larger small buses are also used.

==== Ethiopia ====
Minibus taxis in Ethiopia are one of the most important modes of transport in big cities like Addis Ababa. They are preferred by the majority of the populace over public buses and more traditional taxicabs because they are generally cheap, operate on diverse routes, and are available in abundance. All minibus taxis in Ethiopia have a standard blue-and-white coloring scheme, much as New York taxis are yellow. Minibus taxis are usually Toyota HiAces, frequent the streets. They typically can carry 11 passengers, but will always have room for another until that is no longer the case. The minibus driver has a crew member called a weyala whose job is to collect the fare from passengers.

In 2008, publicly operated public transport was available in Addis Ababa in addition to that provided by the minibuses. A fleet of 350 large buses may operate for this purpose, as such a number does exist. Also as of 2008, the city lacks an independent transport authority, but some regulation, such as that controlling market entry, does exist.

Route syndicates may be present but are described as "various".

==== Ghana ====
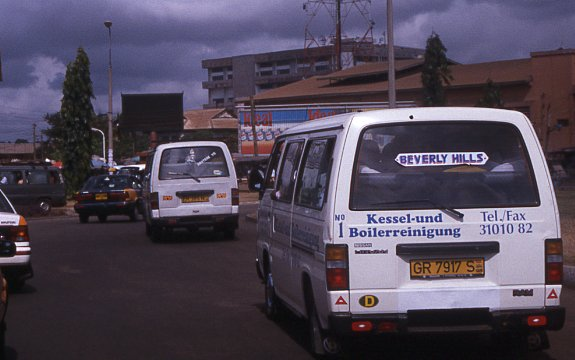
Tro tro in Accra

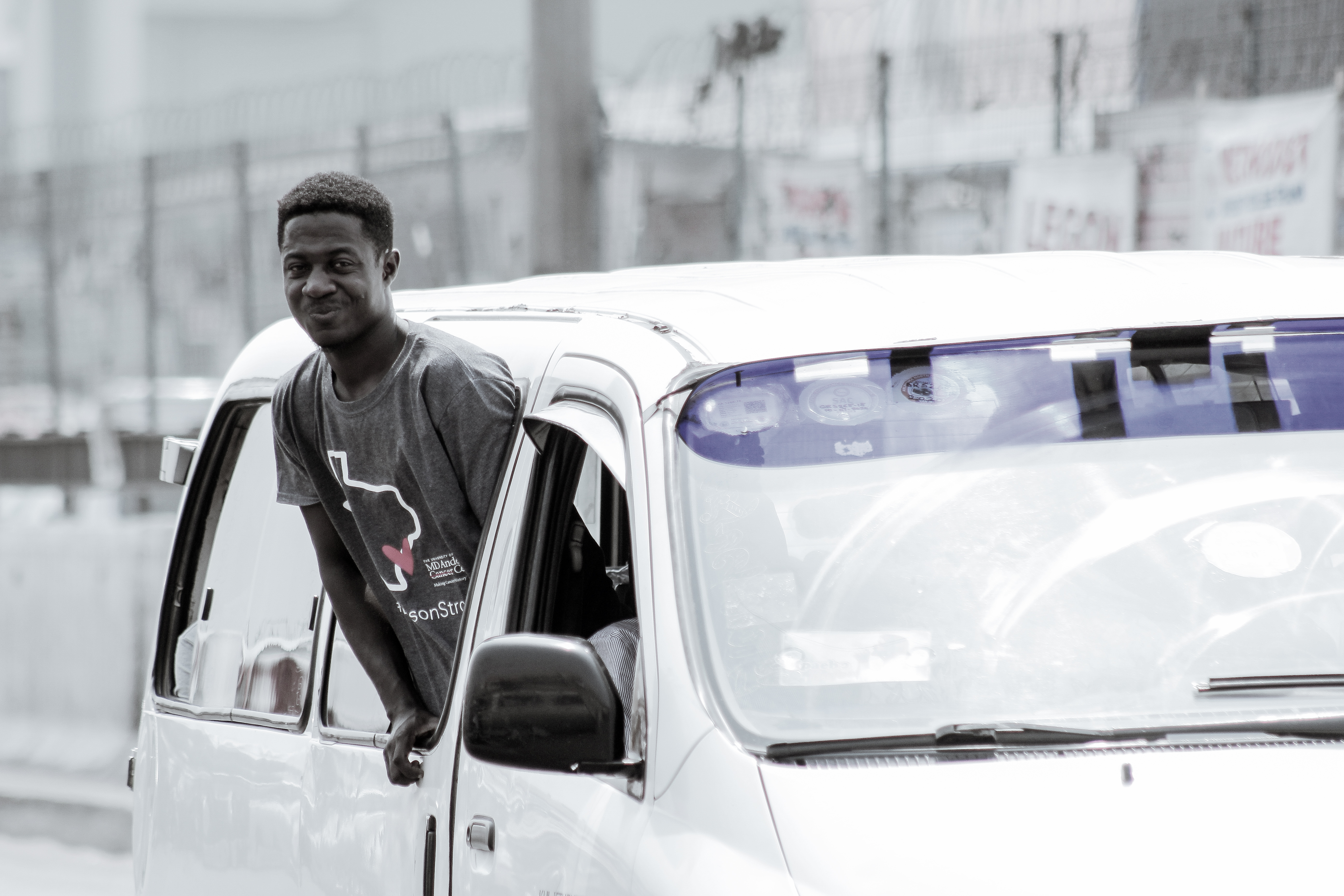
A conductor hanging out of a tro tro and calling out to prospective passengers in Accra, 2020

Mates calling for passengers

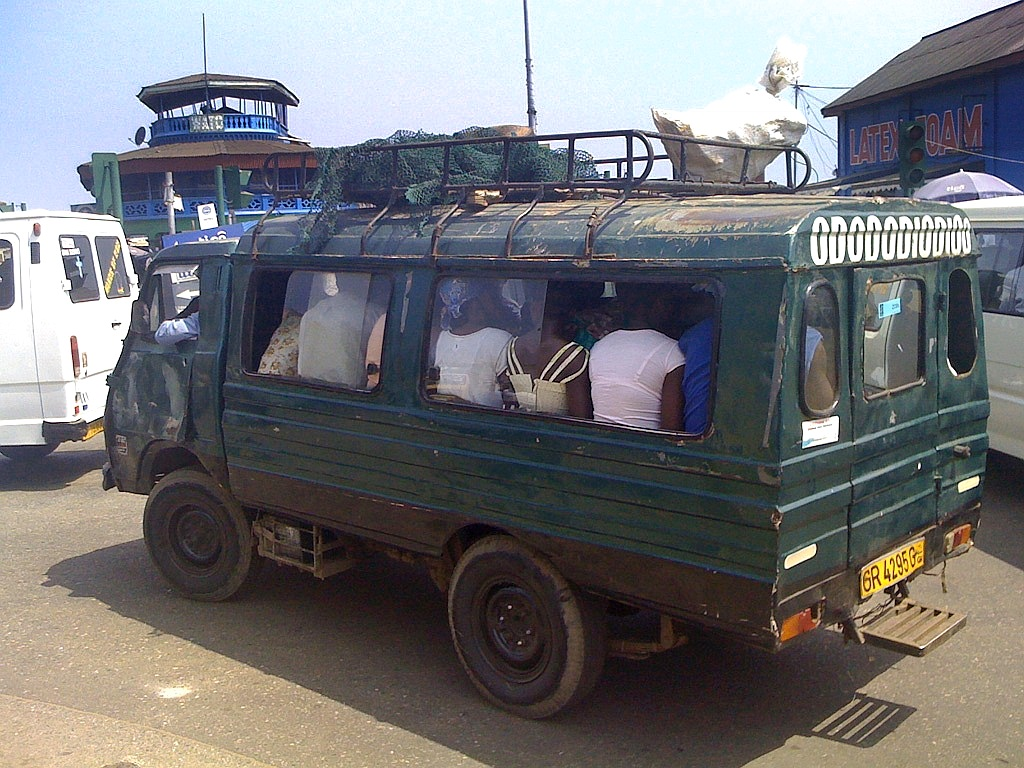
Tro tro in Accra 2009

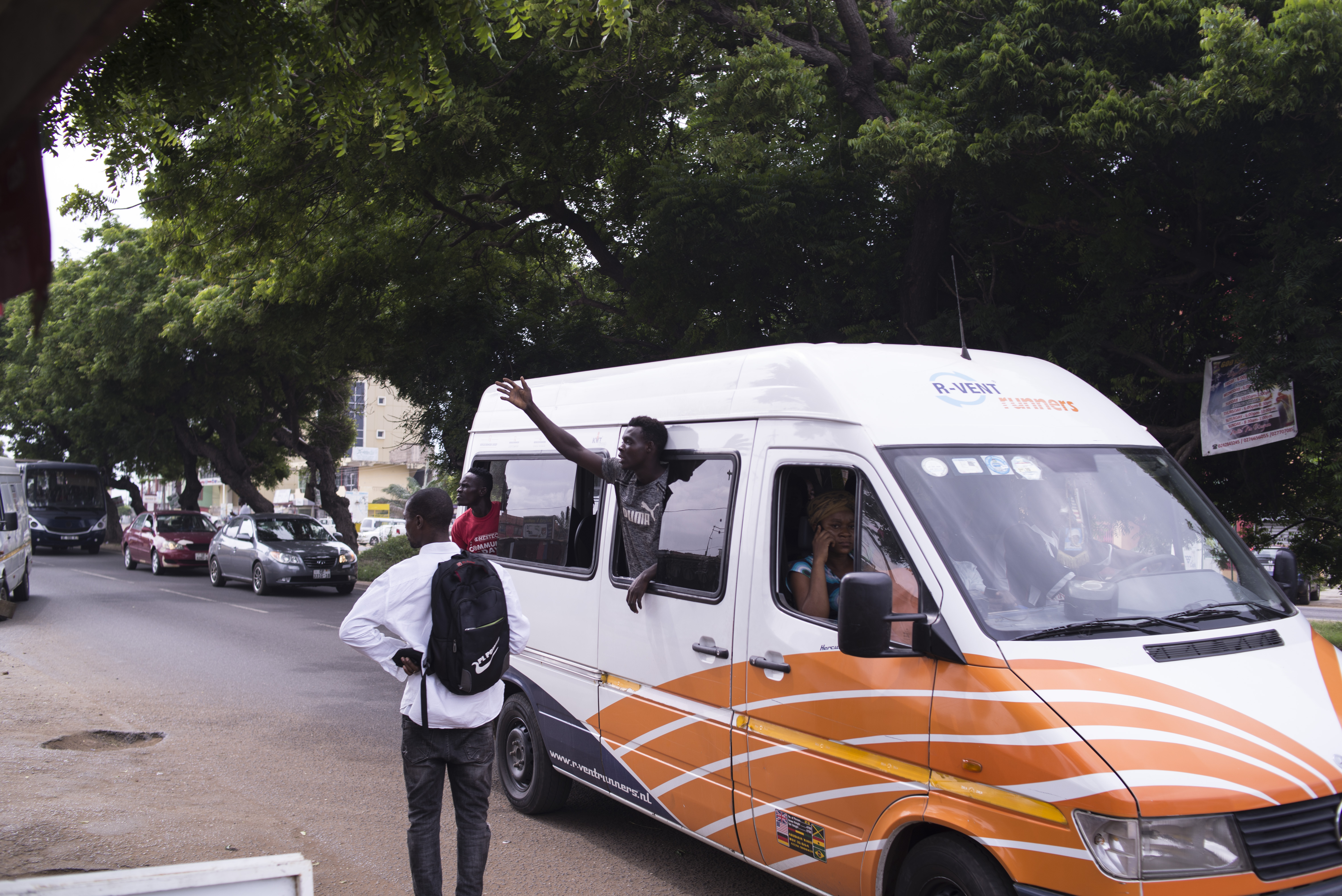
A Mercedes-Benz Sprinter bus with a mate

In Ghana and neighboring countries, share taxis are called tro tro. They are privately owned minibuses that travel fixed routes and leave when filled to capacity. While there are tro tro stations, these shared taxis can also be boarded anywhere along the route.

Operated by a driver and a bus conductor, who collects money, shouts out the destination, and is called a "mate", many are decorated with slogans and sayings, often religious, and few operate on Sundays. A 2010 report by The World Bank found that Tro tro are used by 70% of Ghanaian commuters. This popularity may be because in cities such as Accra there is only basic public transportation save for these small minibuses. An informal means of transportation, in Ghana they are licensed by the government, but the industry is self-regulated. In Accra, syndicates include GPRTU and PROTOA.

Aayalolo, a bus rapid transit system opened in November 2016; however, most people continued to use tro tros as of 2019.

The term "tro tro" is believed to derive from the Ga word tro, "threepence", because the conductors usually asked for "three three pence", which was the standard bus fare in the 1940s, when Ghana still used the British West African pound and later the Ghanaian pound. Alternatively, its origin is not "three times three pence" but rather "threepence [thruhpnce, tro] each": doubling a coin's name in the vernacular means "that coin for each person (or item)". Three pence was the price per passenger in the early 1960s, when pounds/shillings/pence were still in use, including threepence coins, before decimalization of the currency into cedi and pesewa in 1965.

In Ghana, tro tro are licensed by the government, but the industry is self-regulated. There was no independent transport authority as of 2008 in the capital, Accra. In the absence of a regulatory environment, groups called syndicates oversee share taxis. These may collect dues, set routes, manage terminals, and fix fares. In Accra as of 2008, such syndicates include Ghana Private Road Transport Union and PROTOA.

Despite the regulatory challenges, the service was regulated during the COVID-19 pandemic in Ghana. There was 98% compliance to guidelines on physical distancing, although guidelines on individual use of face masks were more difficult to enforce.

==== Ivory Coast ====
In the Ivory Coast, gbaka is a name for minibus public transports. The transport regulator in Abidjan, Ivory Coast, is Agence de Gestion des Transports Urbains or AGETU. As of 2008, Abidjan public transport was serviced by large buses as well as minibuses. Syndicates include UPETCA and SNTMVCI.

==== Kenya ====
In Kenya, regulation does extend to operators and mode of operation (such as routes used) as well as the vehicle.

==== Madagascar ====
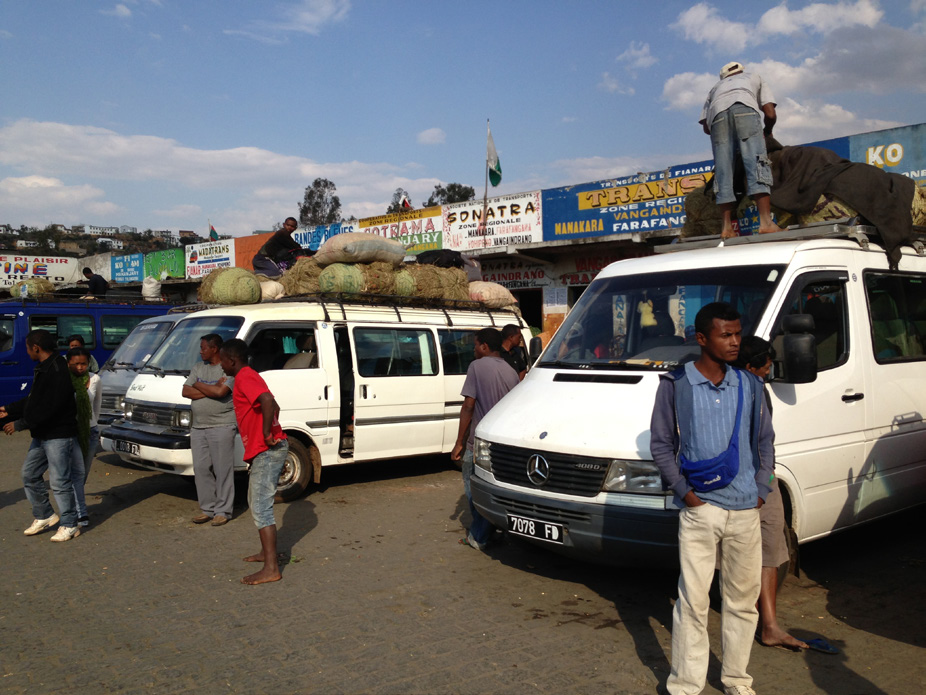
Four taxi brousses at a station in Ambositra

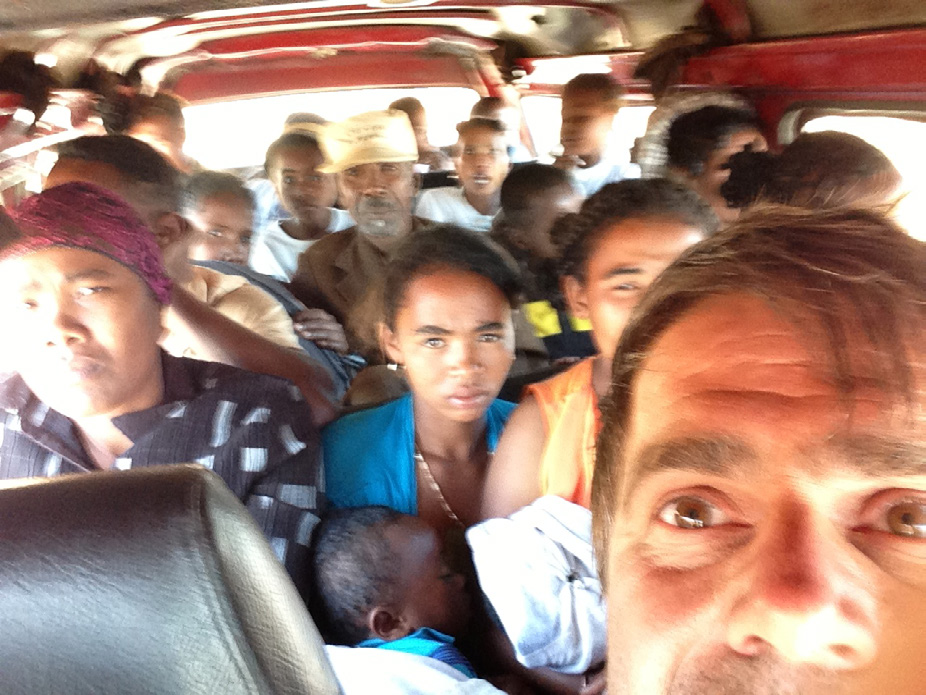
Interior of a crowded taxi brousse

Madagascar's taxi brousses are a type of share taxi that serve as a relatively affordable public transportation system amid Madagascar's poverty. The typical cost in 2005 was US$.10 per person, and most taxi brousses do not embark until all seats are full. While taxi brousses use fixed stops, passengers can also exit at any point along the route. Taxi brousse company fleets range in size from a single vehicle to over a hundred, and may serve one or more urban, regional, or national lines. National lines travel from their origin to their destination directly, disallowing improvised stops along the route. A vehicle is staffed by a driver and assistant driver, or two drivers on a very long route. Other people are employed to attract customers and fasten luggage to the vehicle's roof.

==== Mali ====
In Mali, share taxis are called sotrama and dourouni. As of 2008, Bamako, Mali, has no independent transport authority, but share taxi activity could fall under regulator Direction de la régulation et du contrôle du transport urbain (municipal) or DRCTU control.

==== Morocco ====
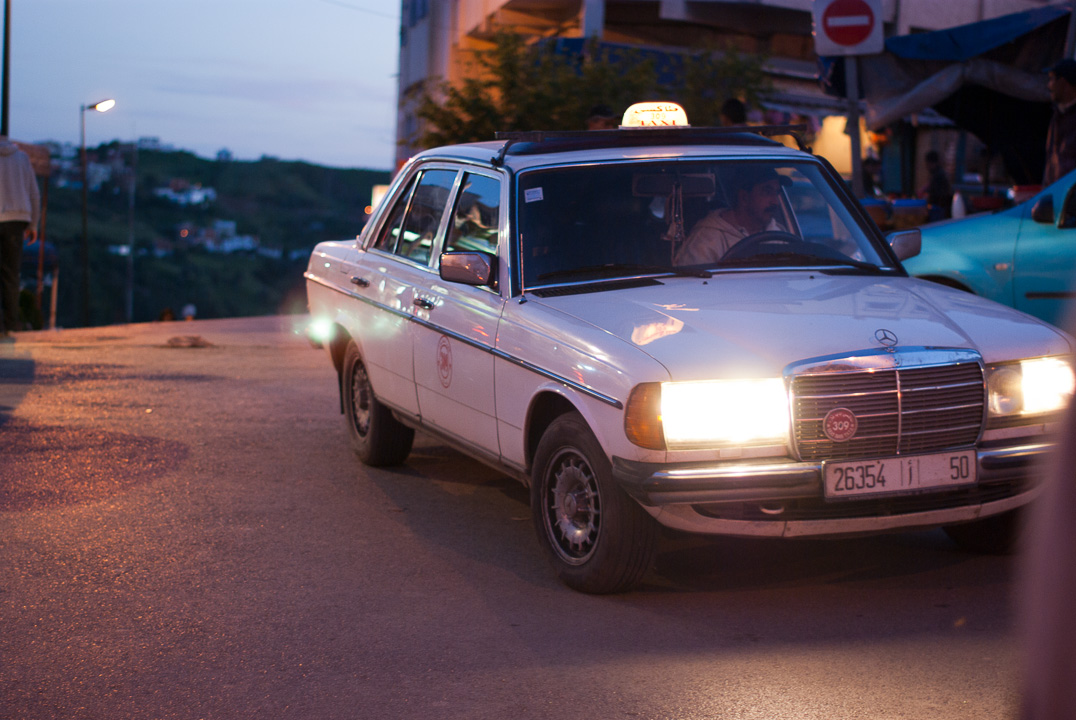
A regular grand taxi in Morocco

In Morocco, intercity share taxis are called grand taxis. They were generally old full-size Mercedes-Benz sedans, and seat six or more passengers, often replaced now with Dacia Lodgy.

==== Nigeria ====
The danfo share taxi and molue minibusses are iconic transport in Lagos, Nigeria.

In Nigeria, both minibusses (called danfo) and midibuses (molue) may be operated as share taxis. Such forms of public transport may also be referred to as bolekaja, and many bear slogans or sayings.

The term kia kia may be used in Yorùbáland to refer to minibus public transports, and means "quick quick".

Lagos, Nigeria, has a transport-dedicated regulator, Lagos Metropolitan Area Transport Agency (LAMATA). Outside of Lagos, most major cities in Africa have similar systems of transport. Syndicates in Lagos include the National Union of Road and Transport Workers (NURTW).

==== Rwanda ====
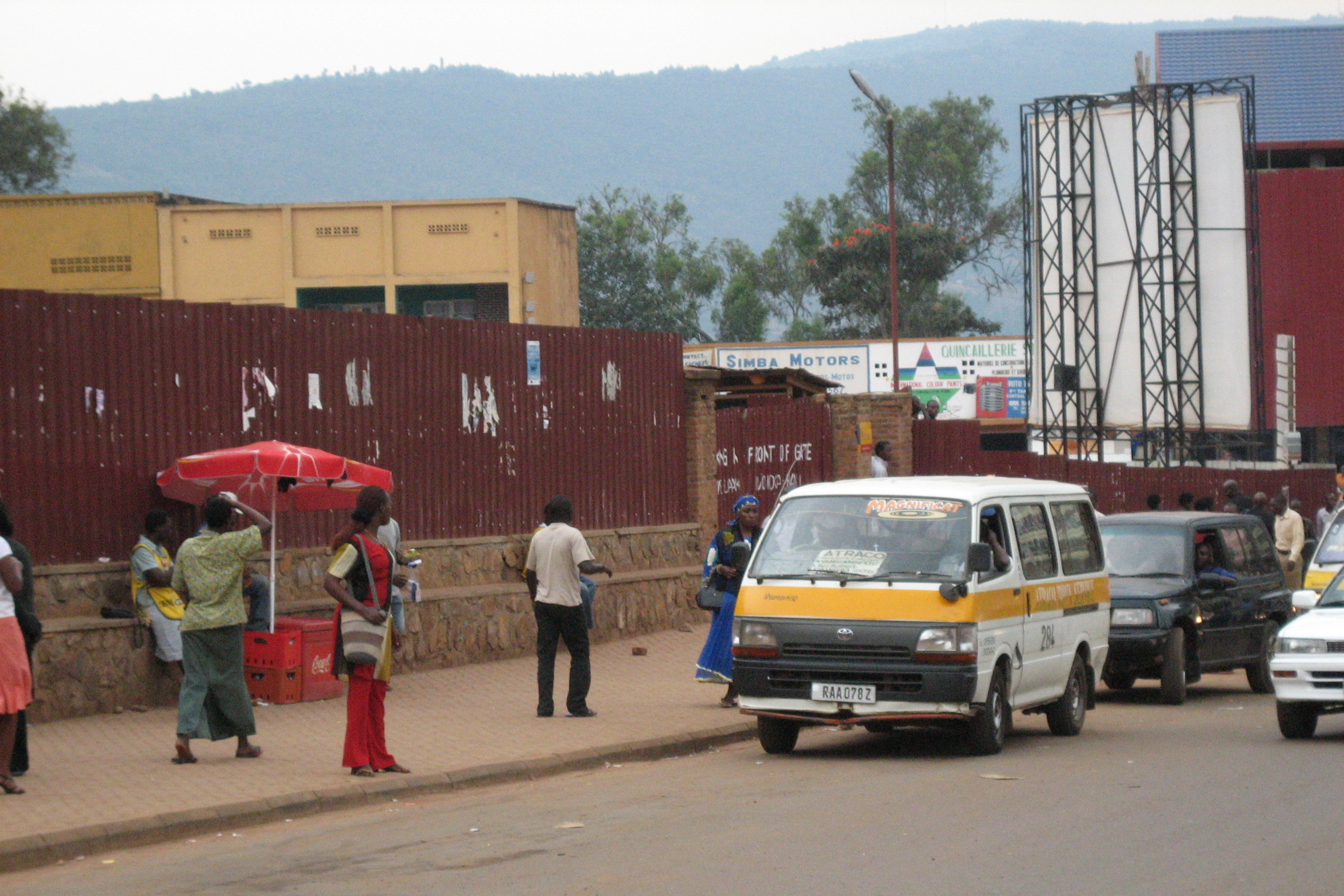
Minibus in Kigali, Rwanda

Minibus public transports in Rwanda may be called coaster buses, share taxis, or twegerane. The latter could easily be a word meaning "stuffed" or "full". As of 2020, in Kigali, Rwanda, syndicates include RFTC, Kigali Bus Services, and Royal Express.

==== South Africa ====
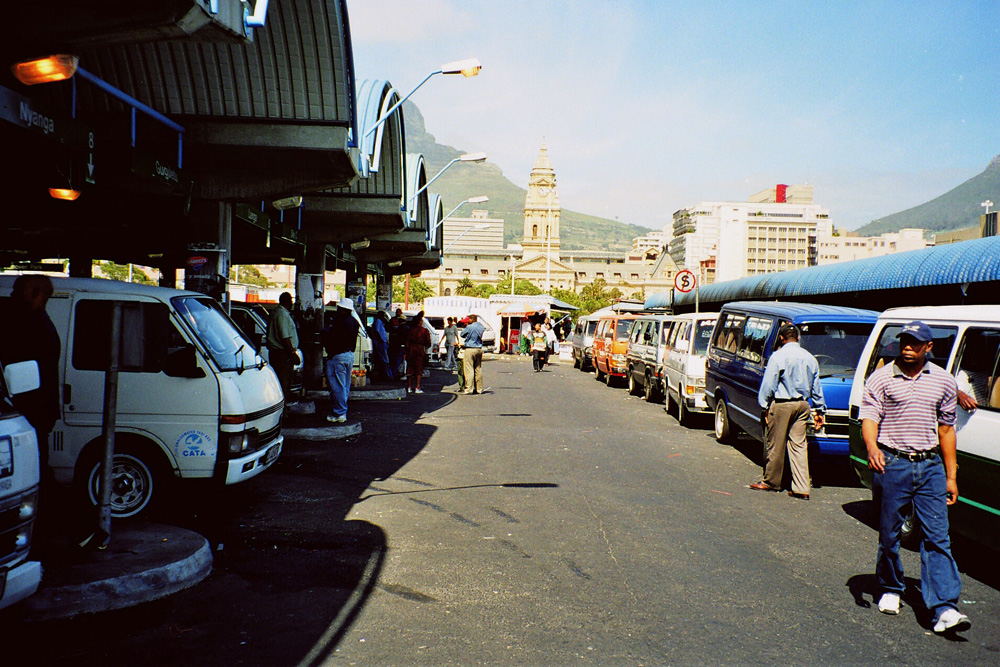
Cape Town minibus taxi rank

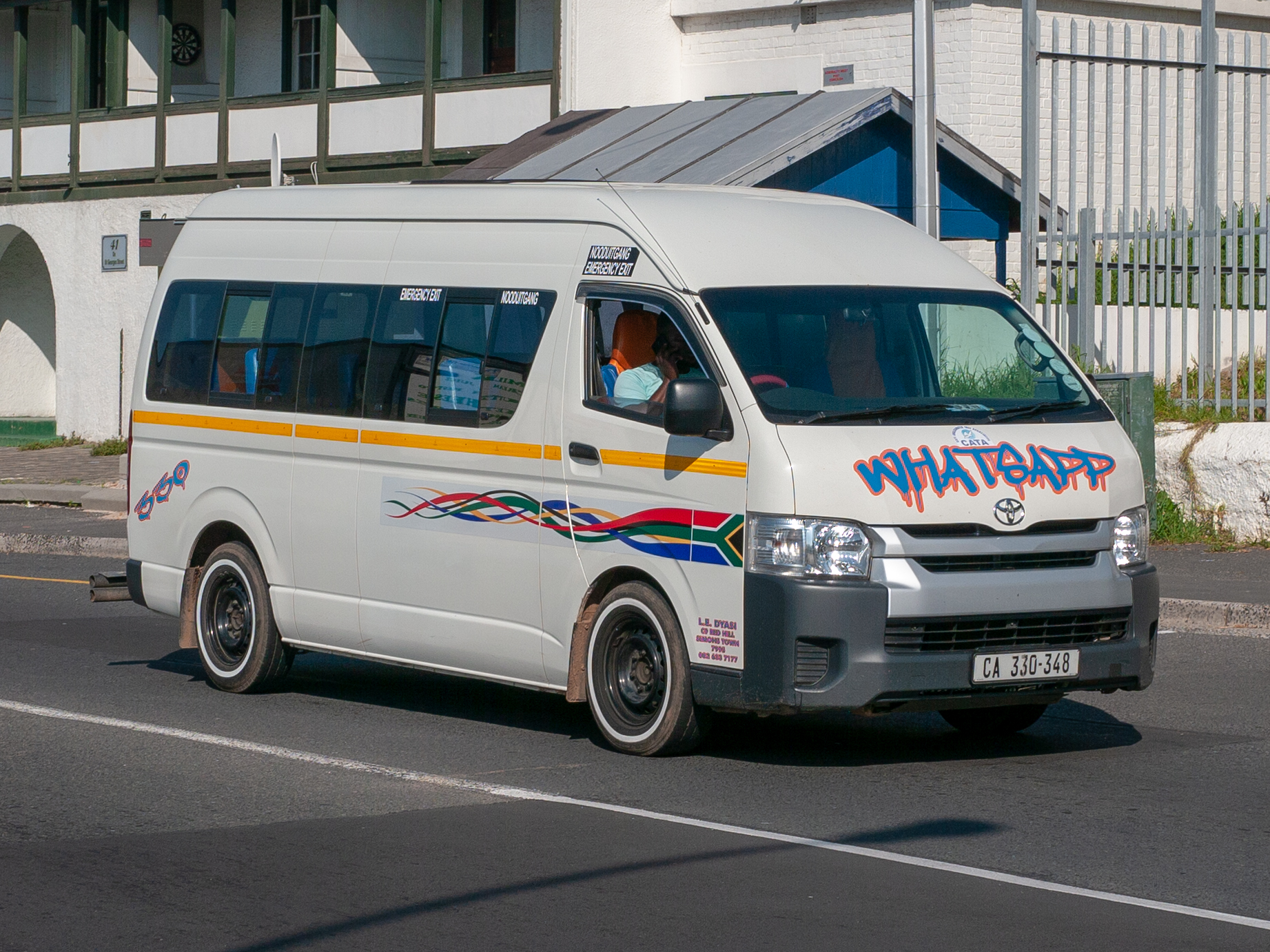
Modern Toyota HiAce share taxi in Cape Town

Over 60% of South African commuters use shared minibus taxis, which are 16 seater commuter buses, sometimes referred to as kombis, or more colloquially known as 'quantum', for only the Toyota HiAce. Many of these vehicles are unsafe and not roadworthy, and often dangerously overloaded. Since the 1980s, share taxis have been severely affected by turf wars. Prior to 1987, the taxi industry in South Africa was highly regulated and controlled. Black taxi operators were declined permits in the Apartheid era and all minibus taxi operations were, by their very nature, illegal. Post-1987, the industry was rapidly deregulated, leading to an influx of new minibus taxi operators, keen to make money off the high demand for this service. Taxi operators banded together to form local and national associations. Because the industry was largely unregulated and the official regulating bodies corrupt, these associations soon engaged in anti-competitive price fixing and exhibited gangster tactics – including the hiring of hit-men and all-out gang warfare.

Along with new legislation, the government has instituted a recapitalization scheme to replace the old and un-roadworthy vehicles with new 18- and 35-seater minibusses. These new minibus taxis carry the South African flag on the side and are notably more spacious and safe.

==== Tanzania ====
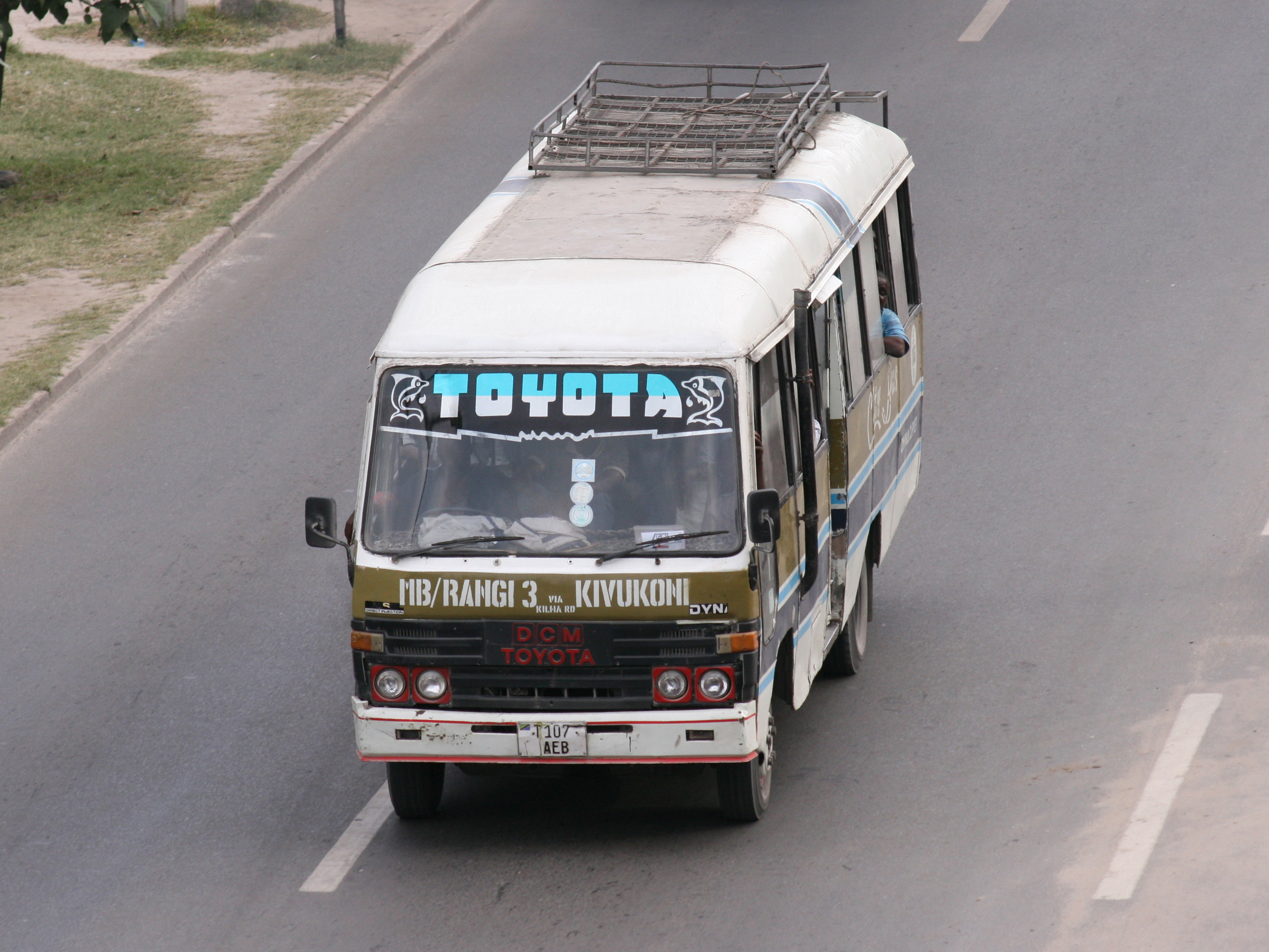
A dala dala in the city of Dar es Salaam

Minivans and minibuses are used as vehicles for hire and referred to as dala dala in Tanzania. While dala dala may run fixed routes picking up passengers at central locations, they will also stop along the route to drop someone off or allow a prospective passenger to board. Before minibuses became widely used, the typical dala dala was a pick-up truck with benches placed in the truck bed.

In Dar es Salaam, as of 2008, publicly operated minibus service also exists.

They are usually run by both a driver and a bus conductor called a mpigadebe, literally meaning "a person who hits a debe" (a 4-gallon tin container used for transporting gasoline or water). The name is in reference to the fact that conductors often hit the roof and side of the van to attract customers and to notify the driver when to leave the station.

Often crowded, they have their routes allocated by a Tanzania transport regulator, Surface and Marine Transport Regulatory Authority (SUMATRA), but syndicates also exist and include DARCOBOA.

==== Tunisia ====
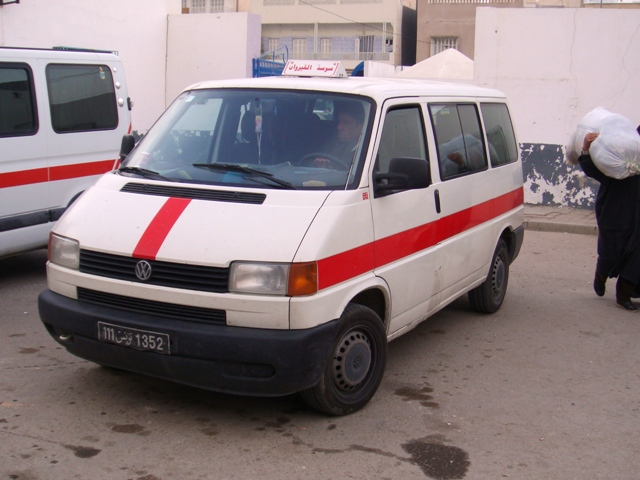
Louage in Tunisia

Share taxis in Tunisia are called louages and follow fixed or semi-fixed routes, departing from stations when full. In French, the name means "rental." Departing only when filled with passengers not at specific times, they can be hired at stations. Louage ply set routes, and fares are set by the government. At most louage stations, tickets must be purchased at a booth and given to the driver.

In contrast to other share taxis in Africa, louage are sparsely decorated. These white vans sport a single colored stripe that alerts potential passengers to the type of transport they offer. Red-striped vans travel from one state to another, Blue which travels from city to city within a state, and yellow which serves rural locales. Blue-striped louage can also be seen. Small placards atop the vans specify either a van's exact destination or the town in which it is registered.

Prior to the introduction of vans, French-made station wagons were used as louages.

==== West Africa ====
The term kia kia may be used in Yorùbáland to refer to minibus public transports, and means "quick quick".

=== Asia ===
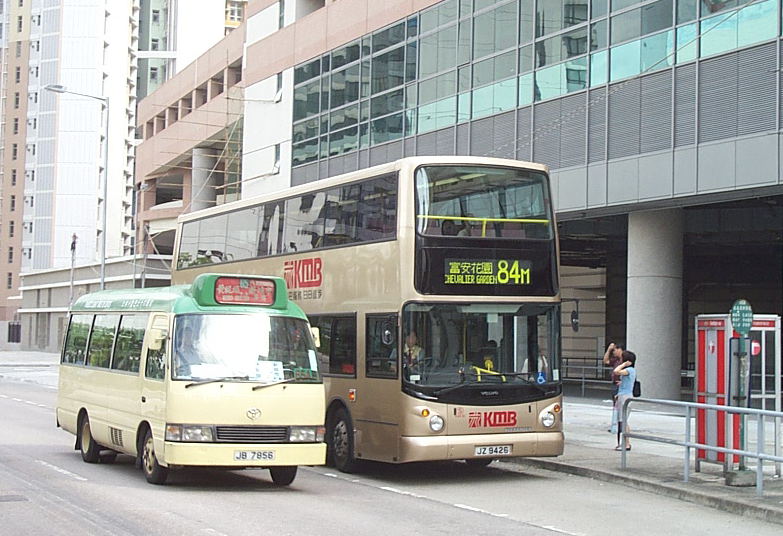
A public light bus (left) and a double-decker bus (right) in Hong Kong

==== Hong Kong ====
Public light buses (Chinese: 公共小型巴士), also known as minibus or maxicab (Chinese: 小巴), run the length and breadth of Hong Kong, through areas which the standard bus lines cannot or do not reach as frequently, quickly or directly. They are 16 or 19 seater minibuses. Public Light Bus are differentiated from usual minibuses with their red coloured roof, and with very few exceptions, lack of route numbers. With no timetable, drivers can depart when they deem the passenger count on board is financially equitable. Special features include its high speeds (up to 110 km/h on some routes; which is illegal when exceeding the 80 km/h limit) and permission for the driver to end the journey prematurely, even with passengers on board. Although within their right to charge the full fare, drivers usually lower or omit the fare if they are unable to deliver the passenger to the promised destination.

Typically offering a faster and more efficient transportation solution due to their small size, limited carrying capacity, frequency, and diverse range of routes (although they are generally slightly more expensive than standard buses), minibusses carry a maximum of 19 seated passengers. Standing passengers are not allowed.

There are two types of public light minibus: green and red. Both types have a cream-coloured body, the distinguishing feature being the colour of the external roof, and the type of service that the colour denotes: green is like regular transit bus with fixed number, route, schedule and fare (but generally not fixed stops); red is a shared taxi, operating on semi-fixed route unregulated, with the driver waiting for enough passengers to justify leaving, as his income depends on the revenue.

==== Cyprus ====
In Cyprus, there are privately owned share taxis that travel to set destinations and board additional passengers en route called service taxis.

==== India ====
In India, several cities have minibuses apart from the presence of three-wheeler taxi-cabs called rickshaws. Minibuses are especially popular in the city of Kolkata for intra-city travel but are also present elsewhere. It is also a crucial mode of public transport in the Himalayan region and in the hilly tracts of Northeast India, as other modes of transport are infrequent or absent altogether.

Shared taxis have been operating in Mumbai, India, since the early 1970s. These are point-to-point services that operate during peak hours. During off-peak hours they ply like regular taxis; they can be hailed anywhere on the roads and passengers are charged by the meter. During peak hours they will take a full cab load of passengers to a more or less common destination. The pick-up points are usually fixed, and sometimes (but not always) marked by a sign saying "shared taxis". Cabs typically line up at this point during peak hours.

They sometimes display their general destination on their windscreens, and passengers get in and wait for the cab to fill up, which leave when full. Fares are fixed and much lower than the metered fare to the same destination, but higher than a bus or train fare.

Such informal arrangements also exist in other Indian cities. Share jeeps are a common form of transportation in the Himalayas, the North Eastern States, and elsewhere.

==== Indonesia ====
In Indonesia, share taxis are officially called Mobil Penumpang Umum (lit. 'public passenger car'). Angkutan Kota (lit. 'city transport'), abbreviated as angkot, are shared taxis in Indonesia widely operating throughout the country, usually with microbuses. In some places there were also three-wheelers with a two-stroke engine, which were called bemo (short for becak motor, such as autorickshaws based on the Daihatsu Midget) but these have been phased out. The older version of Angkot is called oplet. The name of this transportation differs from each different province or area in the country. In Jakarta, it is called angkot or "mikrotrans", in other parts such as in Sulawesi, the term mikrolet (shortened "mikro") is more widely used especially in Manado. In Makassar it is called "pete-pete", in Malang it is called "angkota", in Medan it is called "sudako", in Indonesian Papua it is called "taksi", in Aceh it is called "labi-labi", and in Samarinda it is called "minibus" (but even within the city itself is also called angkot).

Share taxis operated across rural/village routes are called angkutan desa (lit. 'village transport'), abbreviated as angkudes. Angkot and angkudes run accordingly to their exact routes and may stop at any class of bus stations (A, B, and C-Type bus stations). Additionally, passengers can stop the van anywhere along its route, and it is not required to stop at a bus stop.

In 2017, Jakarta launched OK OTrip (rebranded in 2018 as Jak Lingko), a cooperation with Kooperasi Wahana Kalpika to provide an angkot with an integrated fare with Transjakarta. The system was then continuously refined into Mikrotrans, an angkot that is integrated with the wider Transjakarta system. Passengers are not required to pay a fare, but are required to tap a cash card.

In 2023, Surabaya also launched Wirawiri Suroboyo, a feeder system wholly run by the Department of Transport. Passengers are still required to pay fares when boarding a Wirawiri angkot, but are handed tickets that are integrated with the wider Suroboyo Bus and select Trans Semanggi Suroboyo corridors. Several cities have followed Surabaya's model, including Donggala.

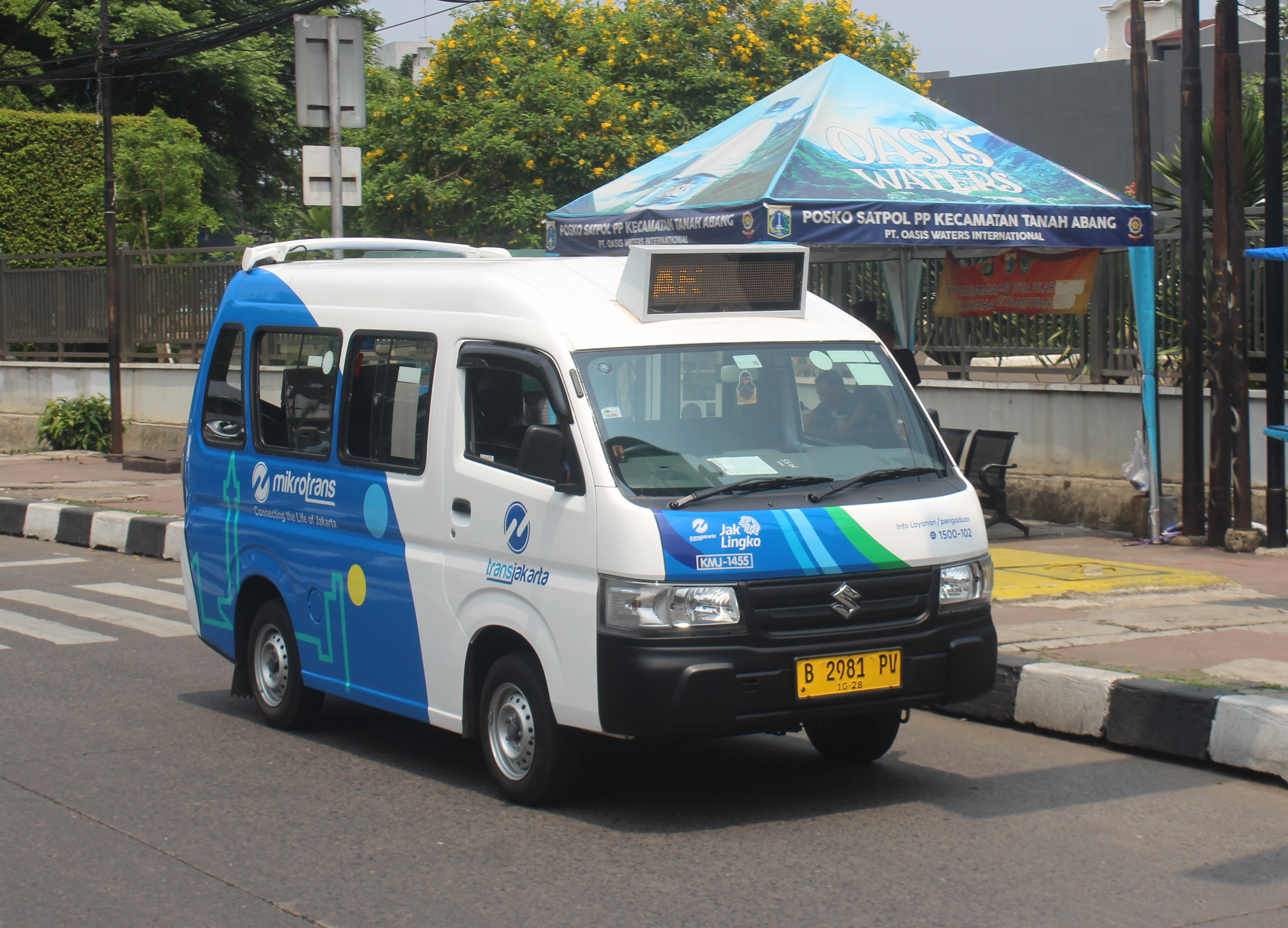
A Mikrotrans operated by Transjakarta in Jakarta

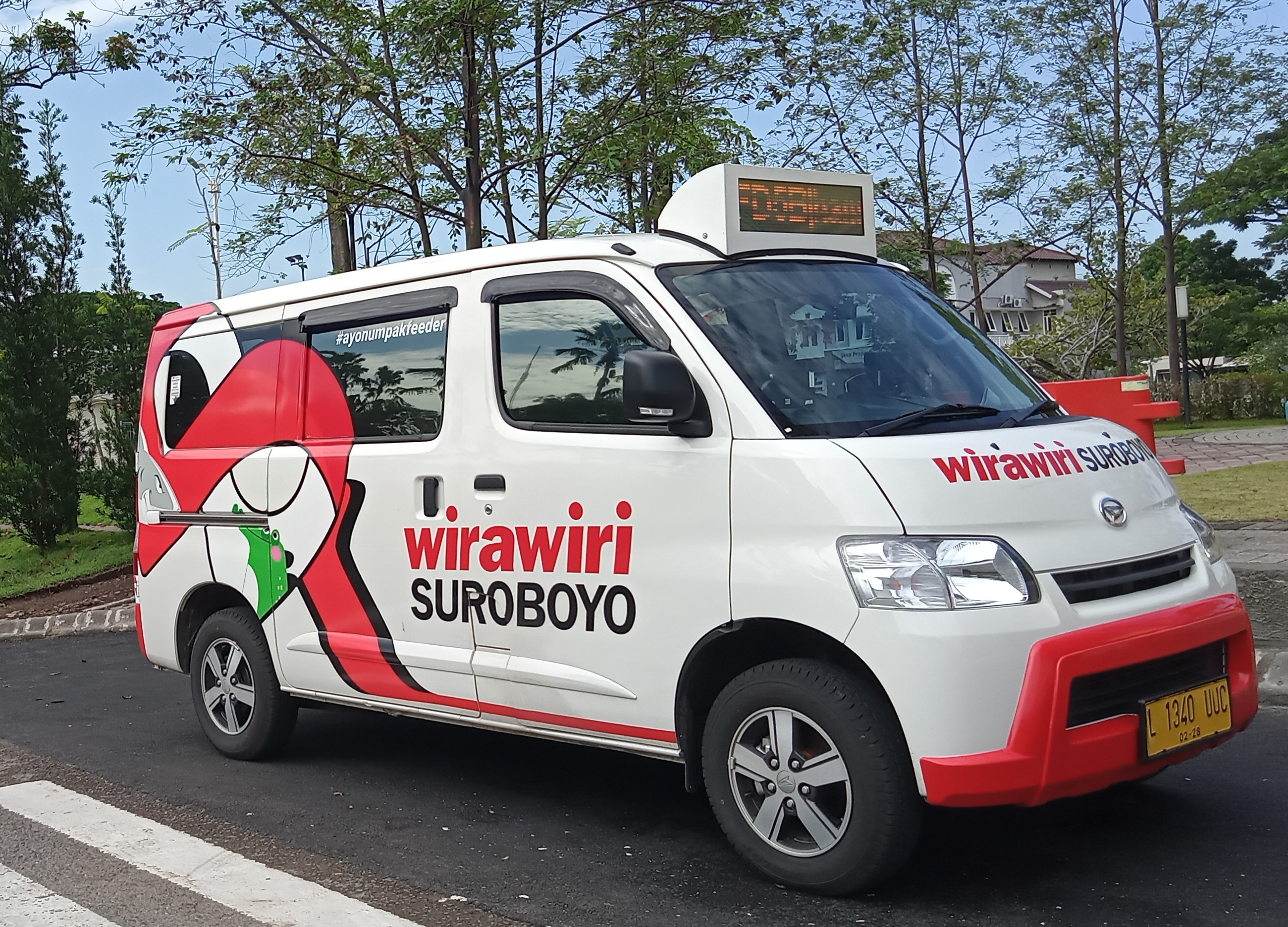
A Wirawiri Suroboyo operated by Suroboyo Bus in Surabaya

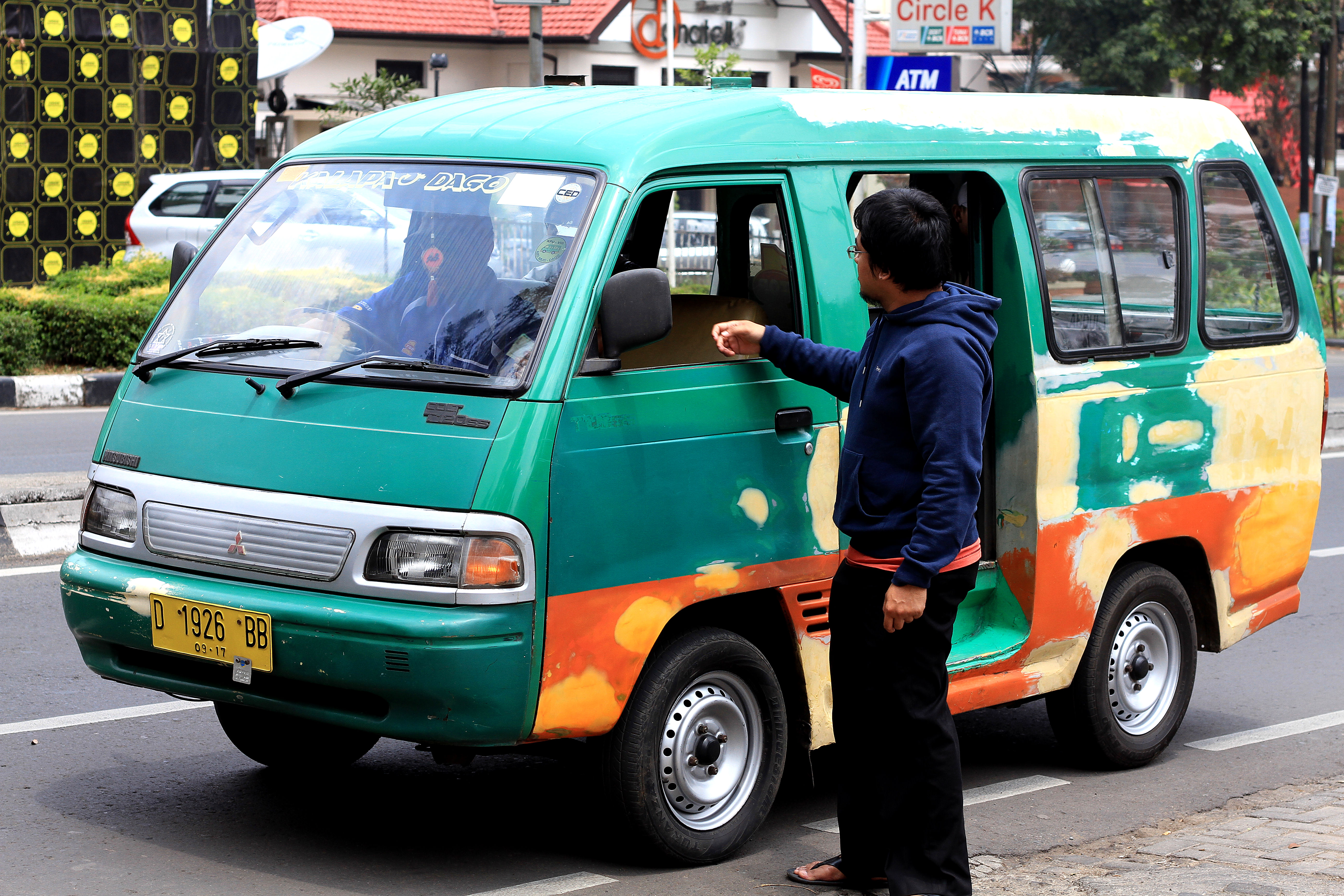
A traditional share taxi or angkot in Bandung

==== Iran ====
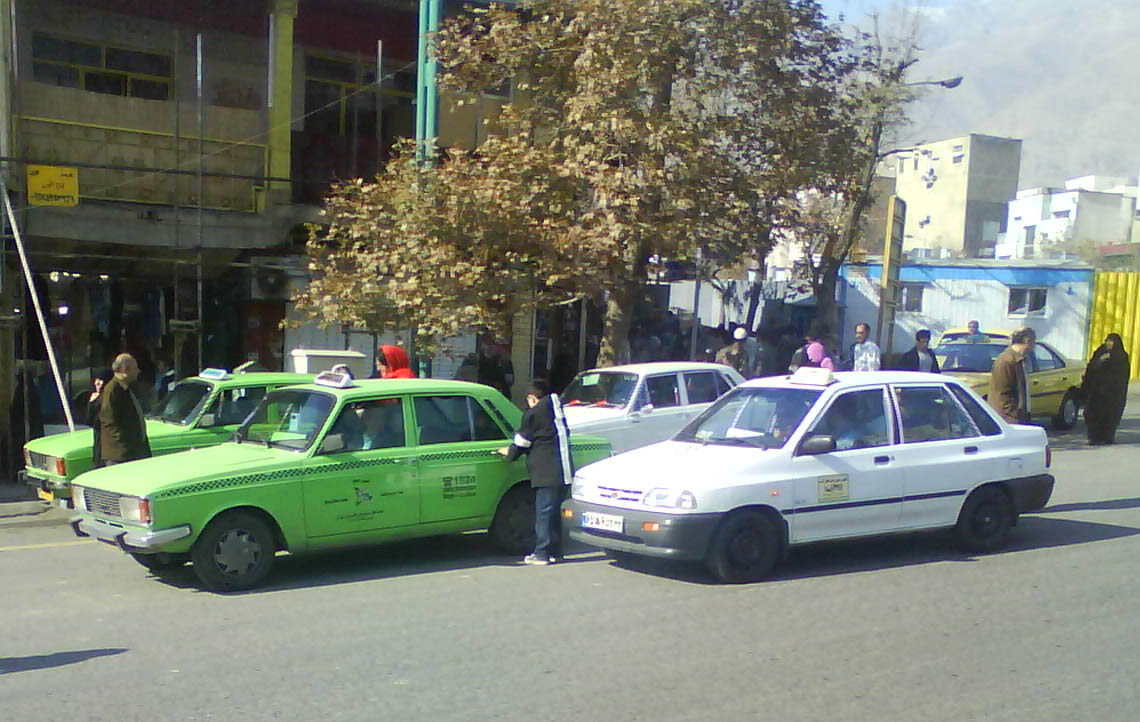
Sharing ajans in Tehran

In Iran, a share taxi is usually called "taxi", while a non-share is called "ajans"/اژانس, pronounced [aʒans]. Four passengers share a taxi and sometimes there is no terminus and they wait in the street side and blare their destination to all taxis until one of them stops. These are regular taxis but if somebody wants to get a non-share taxi he can call for an ajans (taxi service) for himself or wait in the street side and say "Darbast" (which means non-share). It means he is not interested in sharing the taxi and is consequently willing to pay more for the privilege.

Minibuses, with a capacity of 18 passengers, and van taxis, with a capacity of 10 passengers are other kinds of share transport in Iran.

==== Israel ====
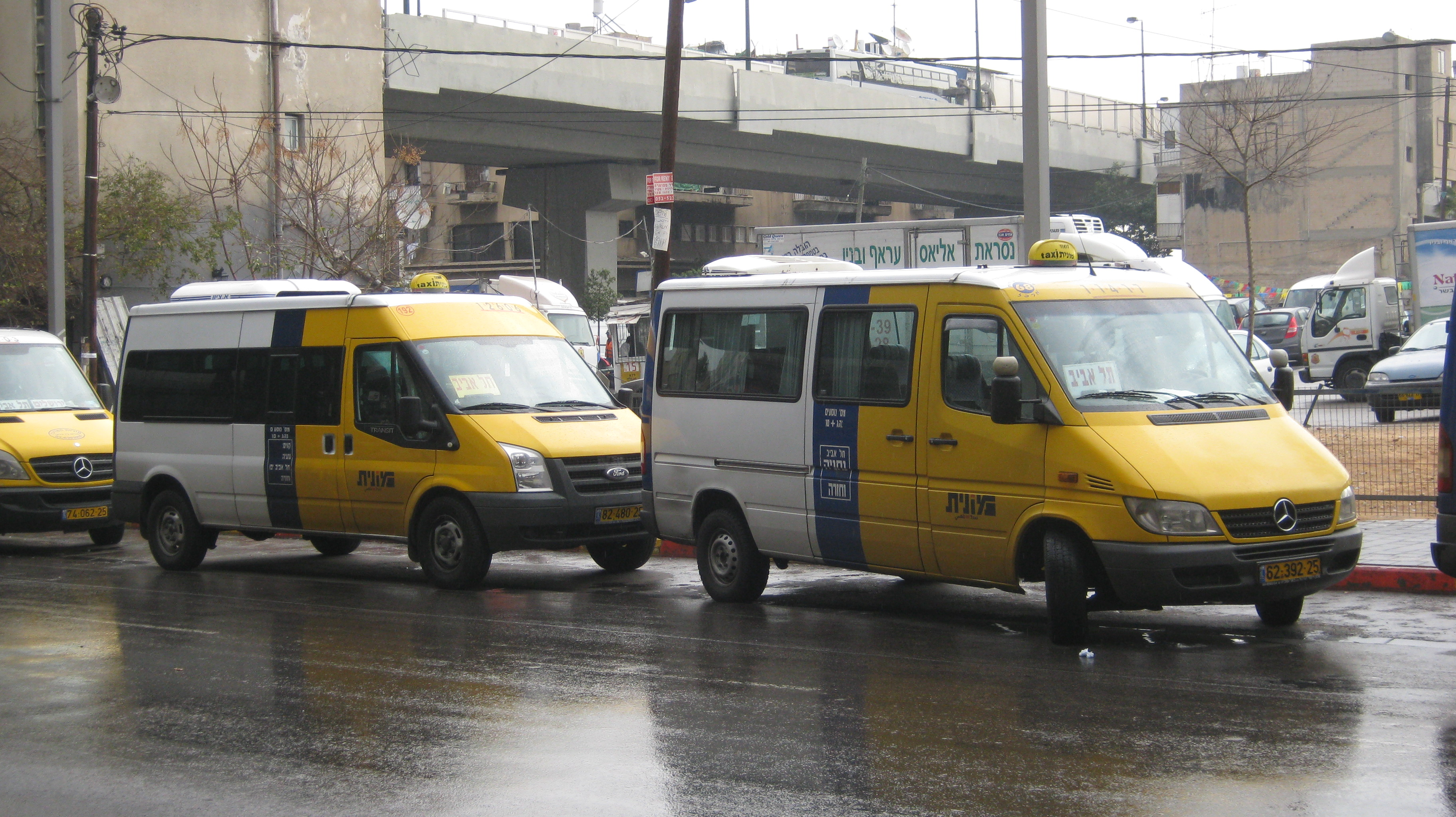
Sherut taxis

In Hebrew: מונית שירות monit sherut, pl. Hebrew: מוניות שירות moniyot sherut is a word meaning "service taxi". Referring to vans or minibuses that serve as share taxis in Israel, these can be picked up from anywhere on their route. They follow fixed routes (sometimes the same routes as public transport buses) and usually leave from the initial station only when full. Moniyot sherut operate both inter- and intra-city. Payment is often done by passing money to the driver in a "human chain" formed by the passengers seated before. The change (and the receipt, when requested) are returned to the person who paid by the same means. In intra-city routes, where they compete with official buses, the drivers usually coordinate their travel by radio so that they can arrive at the bus station just before public transport buses and take the most passengers.

Monit sherut is one of the only forms of transit accessible to many Israelis during Shabbat, as most public transportation in the country closes down between sunset on Friday and nightfall on Saturday.

In Israel, Mercedes are used, owned generally by Arabs, and very efficient, having space for 7–8 people, and having loosely fixed routes, dropping a passenger either at a specific terminus or going a little out of the way to facilitate the passenger.

==== Philippines ====
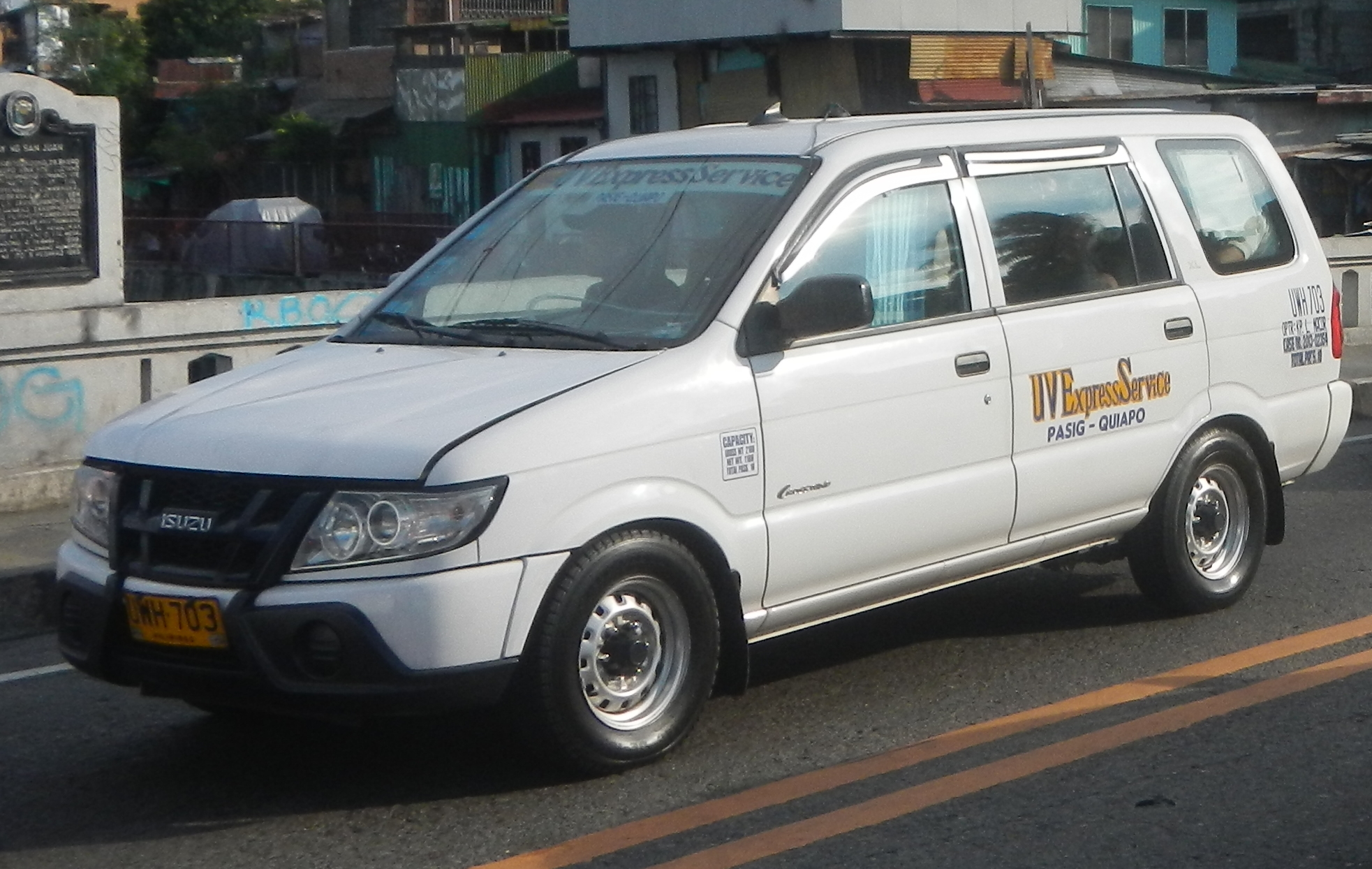
UV Express vehicle in Metro Manila

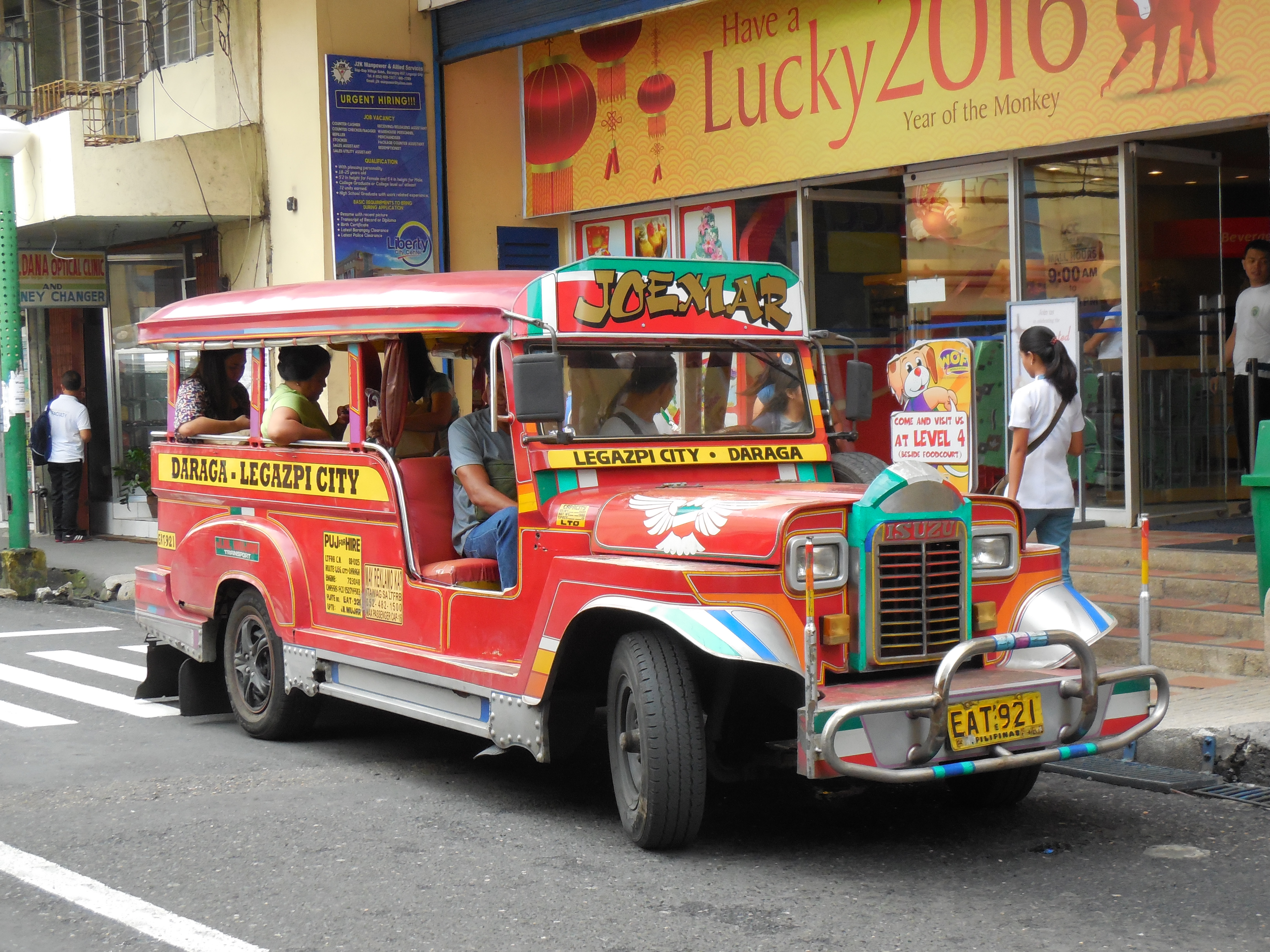
A typical jeepney in Legazpi, The Philippines

The most popular means of public transportation in the Philippines as of 2007, jeepneys were originally made out of US military jeeps left over from World War II and are known for their color and flamboyant decoration. The jeepneys are built by local automobile repair shops from a combination of prefabricated elements (from a handful of Filipino manufacturers) and improvisation and in most cases equipped with "surplus" or used Japanese SUV or light truck engines, drive train, suspension and steering components (from recycled vehicles in Japan).

They have not changed much since their post-war creation, even in the face of increased access to pre-made vehicles, such as minibuses. However, due to the government's Public Utility Vehicle Modernization Program, Jeepneys and other modes of transportation must comply to the newer Philippine National Standards which is more compliant with international standards.

Older jeepneys have the entrance on the back, and there is space for two people beside the driver (or more if they are small) while the modern jeepneys have two doors on the right side of the vehicle. The back cab of the Jeepney is equipped with two long bench seats along the sides and the people seated closest to the driver are responsible for passing the fare of new passengers forward to the driver and the change back to the passenger. The start and end point of the jeepney route is often a jeepney terminal, where there is a queue system so only one jeepney plying a particular route is filled at a time, and where a person helps the driver to collect fares and fill the vehicles with people, usually to more than comfortable capacity.

Preferring to leave only when full and only stop for a crowd of potential passengers, riders can nonetheless disembark at any time; and while jeepneys ply fixed routes, these may be subject to change over time. New ones may need approval from a Philippine transport regulator. Jeepney stations do exist.

Another share taxi that is also common in the Philippines is the UV Express which uses Compact MPVs and vans as its form factor. These vehicles seat 10–18 people and charge an additional 2 Philippine peso per kilometer (as of 2013).

==== Thailand ====
Literally "two rows" a songthaew or song thaew (Thai สองแถว, Lao: ສອງແຖວ [sɔ̌ːŋtʰíw]) is a passenger vehicle in Thailand and Laos adapted from a pick-up or a larger truck and used as a share taxi. They are also known as baht buses.

==== Timor-Leste ====
The main form of public transportation in Dili, the capital of Timor-Leste, is a system of microlets, also referred to informally as bemos, which are similar to Indonesian angkots. There are thirteen microlet routes in Dili, each distinguished by a different number and color. Each route is a loop, with few formal stops; instead, passengers wave down a microlet along its route when they wish to ride. To get off, passengers tap a coin on the metal railing inside the vehicle to indicate for the driver to stop. Microlet rides cost 25 centavos (US$0.25), regardless of distance traveled.

==== Turkey and Northern Cyprus ====
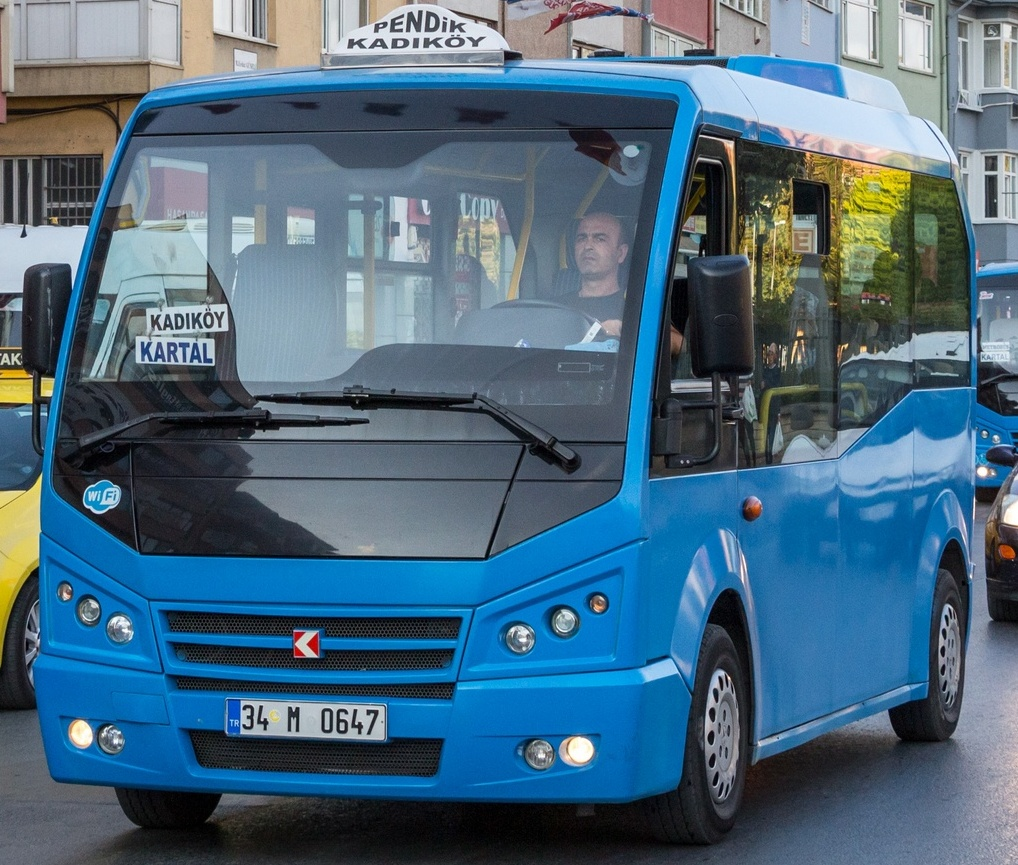
An Karsan Jest dolmuş

In Turkey and Northern Cyprus, dolmuşlar (singular dolmuş, pronounced "dolmush") are share taxis that run on set routes within and between cities. These cars or minibuses display their routes on a signboard behind the windscreen. Some cities may only allow dolmuş to pick up and drop passengers at designated stops, and terminals also exist. The word derives from Turkish for "full" or "stuffed", as these share taxis depart from the terminal only when a sufficient number of passengers have boarded. Visitors to Turkey have been surprised by the speed of dolmuş travel. There are also minibuses (Minibus) In the outskirts of cities like Istanbul, that take people from Point A to Point B, however they can get really crowded. They also have stops that are not usually labelled.

Traveling intra and inter-city, the privately owned minibuses are overseen by a governance institution; routes are leased and vehicles licensed. Passengers board anywhere along the route as well as at termini and official stations. Dolmuşlar in Turkish-controlled Northern Cyprus display their routes but don't follow timetables.

==== West Bank, Palestine ====
Share taxis are often called "ser-vees" (service taxi) in the West Bank. Minibuses are often used in lieu of vans. Ford Transit vans were often a popular vehicle for conversion, resulting in the generic trademark "Ford" and "Fordat"(pl) being used to describe minibusses of various makes, replacing aging Mercedes sedans.

=== Oceania ===
==== New Zealand ====
In New Zealand the first widespread motor vehicle services were shared taxi services termed service cars; a significant early provider was Aard, operating elongated Hudson Super Sixes. By 1930, there were 597 service cars. Aard was taken over by New Zealand Railways Road Services in 1928.

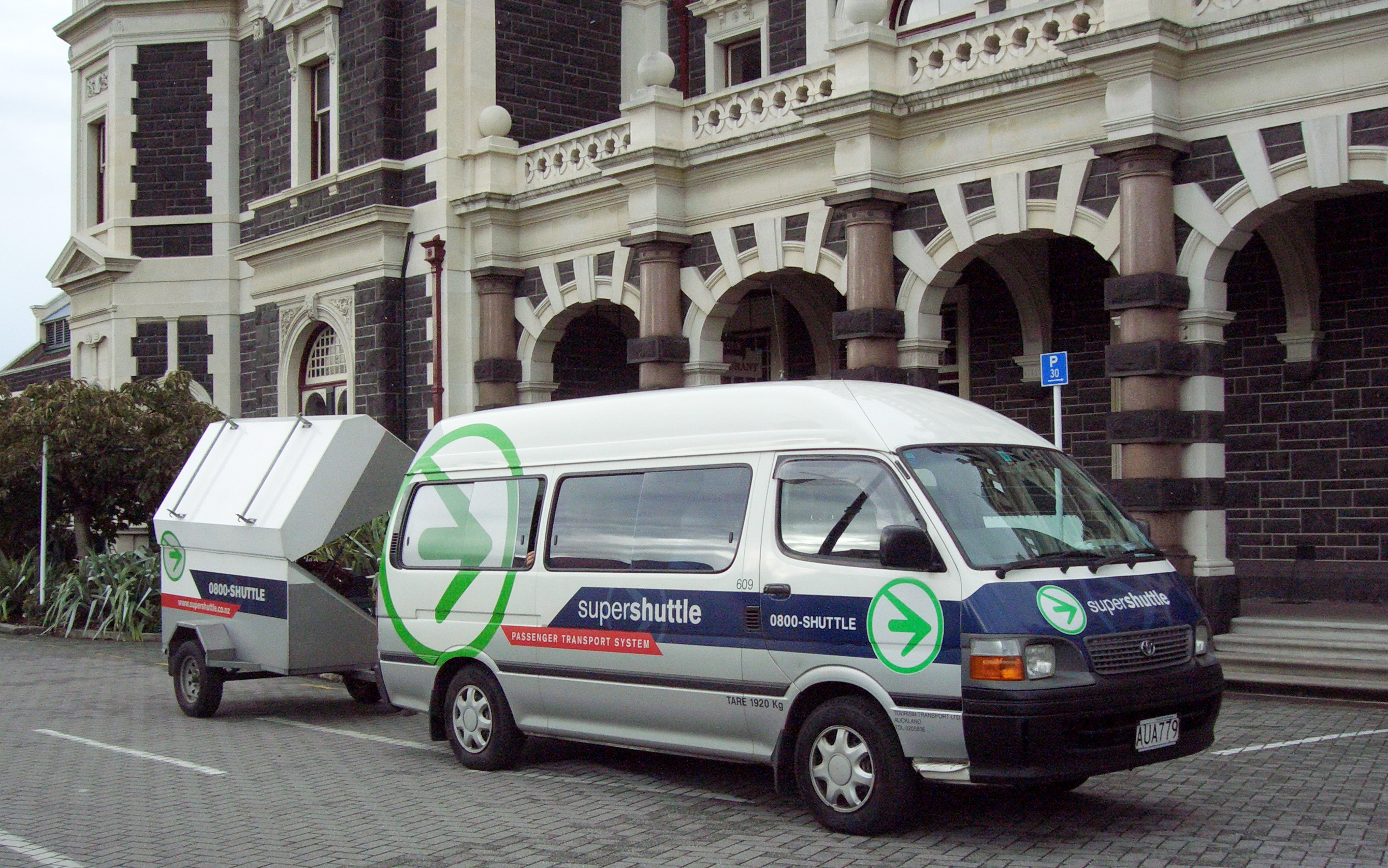
A shuttle van service to Dunedin International Airport picks up a passenger at Dunedin Railway Station in New Zealand.

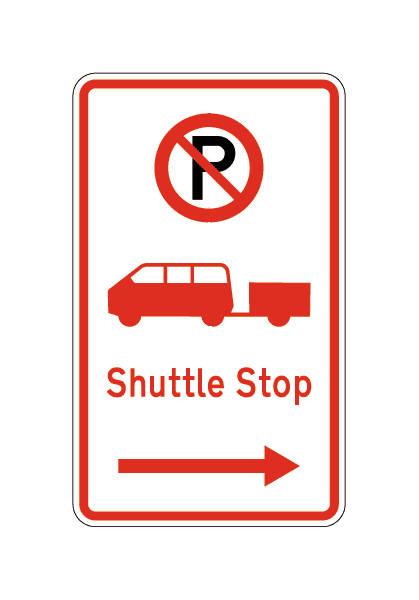
Sign for a shuttle stop

Shared taxis in New Zealand nowadays are referred to as shuttles or shuttle vans.

Shared buses or vans are available in many more developed countries connecting frequent destinations, charging a fixed fee per passenger. The most common case is a connection between an airport and central city locations. These services are often known as shuttles. Such services usually use smaller vehicles than normal buses and often operate on demand. An air traveler can contact the shuttle company by telephone or Internet, not necessarily in advance; the company will ensure that a shuttle is provided without unreasonable delay. The shuttle will typically connect one airport with several large hotels, or addresses in a specified area of the city. The shuttle offers much of the convenience of a taxi, although it takes longer, at a price that is significantly lower for one or two passengers. Scheduled services between an airport and a hotel, usually operated by the hotel, are also called shuttles. In many cases the shuttle operator takes the risk of there not being enough passengers to make the trip profitable; in others, there is a minimum charge when there are not enough passengers.

Usually, there are regulations covering vehicles and drivers; for example in New Zealand under NZTA regulations, shuttles are only allowed to have up to eleven passenger seats, and the driver must have a passenger endorsement (P) on their driver's license.

=== Europe ===
==== Bulgaria ====
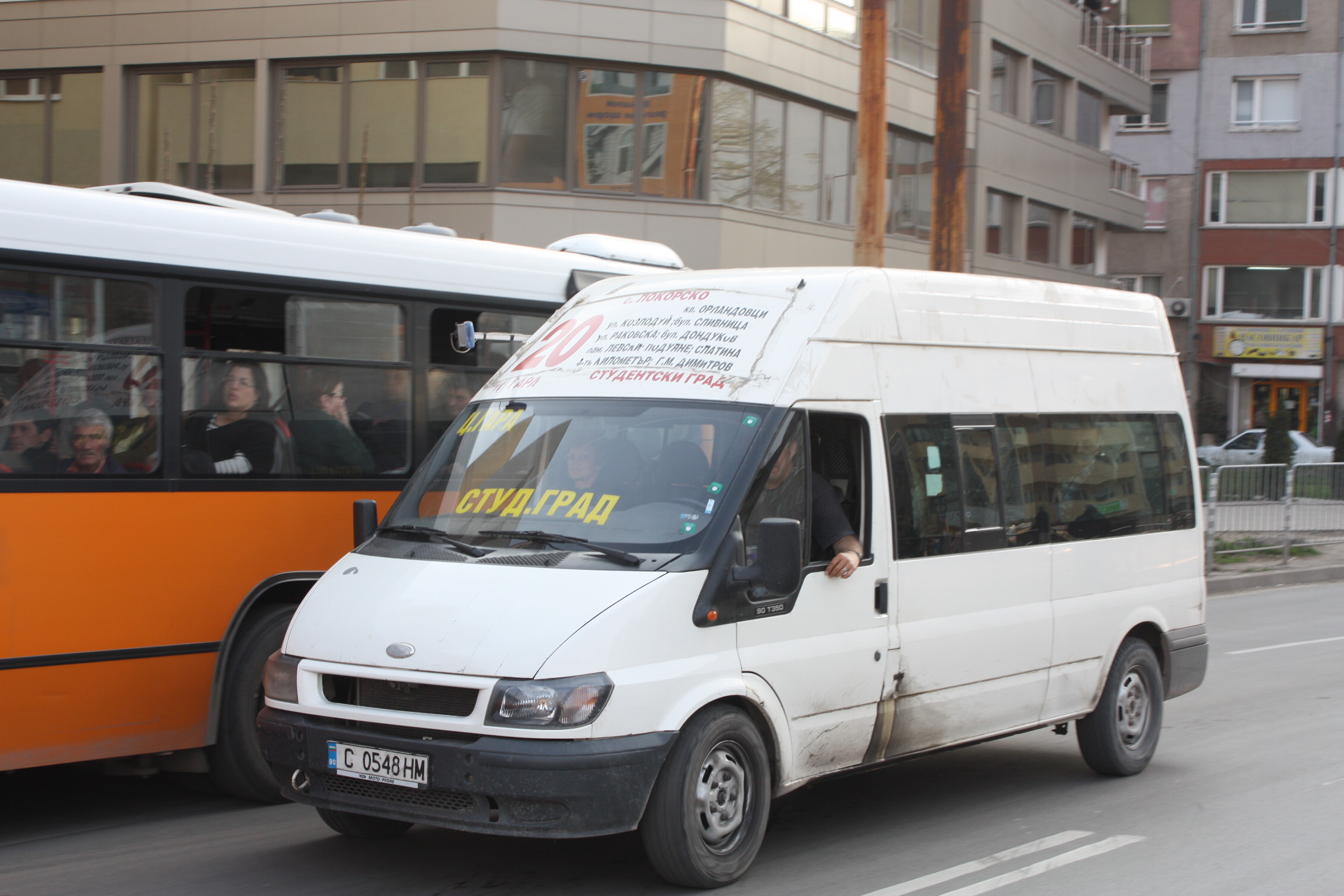
A Ford Transit marshrutka in Sofia, Bulgaria

Marshrutkas are rare in Bulgaria. As of 2021, only a single route operates in Sofia, while 10 lines operate in Plovdiv. They are customized passenger vans that have been modified to include large windows in the back, rails and handles. Marshrutkas are commonly white, although their colour varied, and are partially covered in advertising. In some cases, seating has been modified — popular routes carrying more passengers typically have more standing space. Examples of van models include Peugeot Boxer, Citroën Jumper, Ford Transit, Iveco Daily and Renault Master. They have a fixed fare; the fare is paid upon boarding. Marshrutkas were not obliged to stop anywhere on the route, although they did slow down around popular spots. Marshrutka drivers were asked to stop and pick one up in a taxi-like manner; the getting-off was arranged with the driver, often by just standing up and approaching the door. Sometimes the driver would ask for consent to veer off the route to avoid a traffic jam or roadworks.

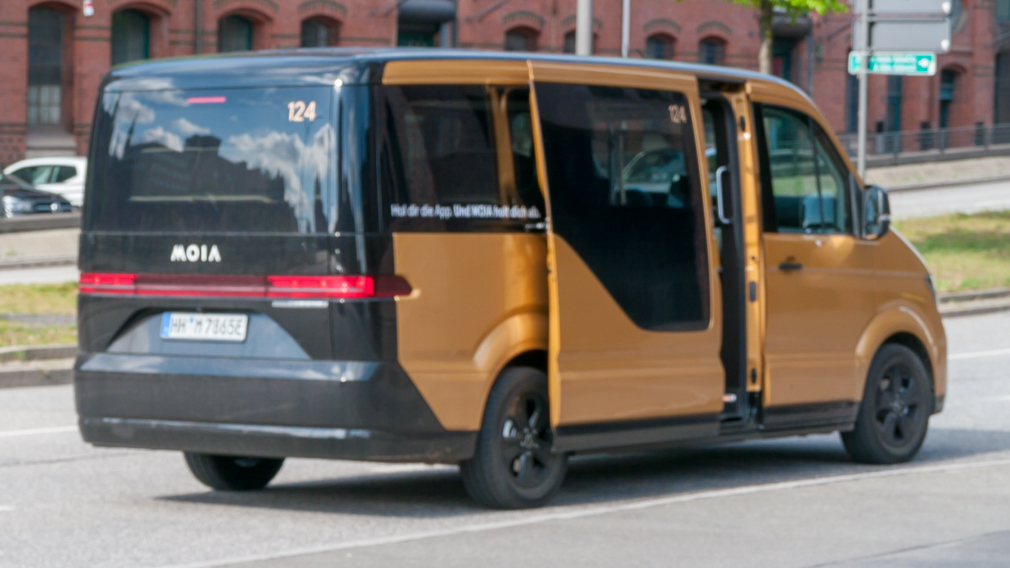
MOIA van in Hamburg, Germany

==== Greece ====
In Athens, Greece most taxis were share taxis, but since the country joined the EU in 1981, this tradition started to disappear.

==== Moldova ====
In Moldova, share taxis are called rutiere (singular rutieră). Introduced in 1981, they are private, owner-operated minibuses that operate along fixed routes. In cities, each rutieră route has a given number, as in the case of buses or trolleybuses.

==== Netherlands ====
Besides the conventional deeltaxi, there are treintaxis in some Dutch towns. Operated on behalf of the Netherlands Railways, they run to and from railway stations and the ride is shared with additional passengers picked up along the way. Tickets can be purchased at railway ticket offices or from the cabdriver, but treintaxis must be ordered by phone unless boarding at a railway station.

==== Romania ====
In Romania, microbuze or maxi-taxi supplied the need of affordable public transportation in smaller towns when some local administrations abolished the expensive community-owned systems of buses. In Bucharest, this form of transportation appeared in 1977, when the ITB began using them as a peak-hour service, beginning to use Irannational-made Mercedes-Benz T2 vans, being supplemented in 1983 by Rocar-TV 35M vans. Prior to this, in 1973, the ITB experimented with what was called at the time "fixed taxi lines", which ran between the Drumul Taberei, Titan and Berceni housing estates and picked up and stopped passengers on request, before discontinuing the experiment the following year.

In 1990, the newly founded RATB sold off its operations to private operators, who began using them in competition to the RATB. They enjoyed wide popularity, especially from 2003 to 2007, and from 2011 onwards, when the RATB lost the rights to operate suburban routes. On the Black Sea shore, it is very common to travel from Constanţa or Mangalia to the resorts on minibuses (microbuze), especially in those resorts where the competing train service is far from the beach and/or lodging facilities. These minibuses have been criticised for their shady operations, lack of safety and primitive transportation conditions.

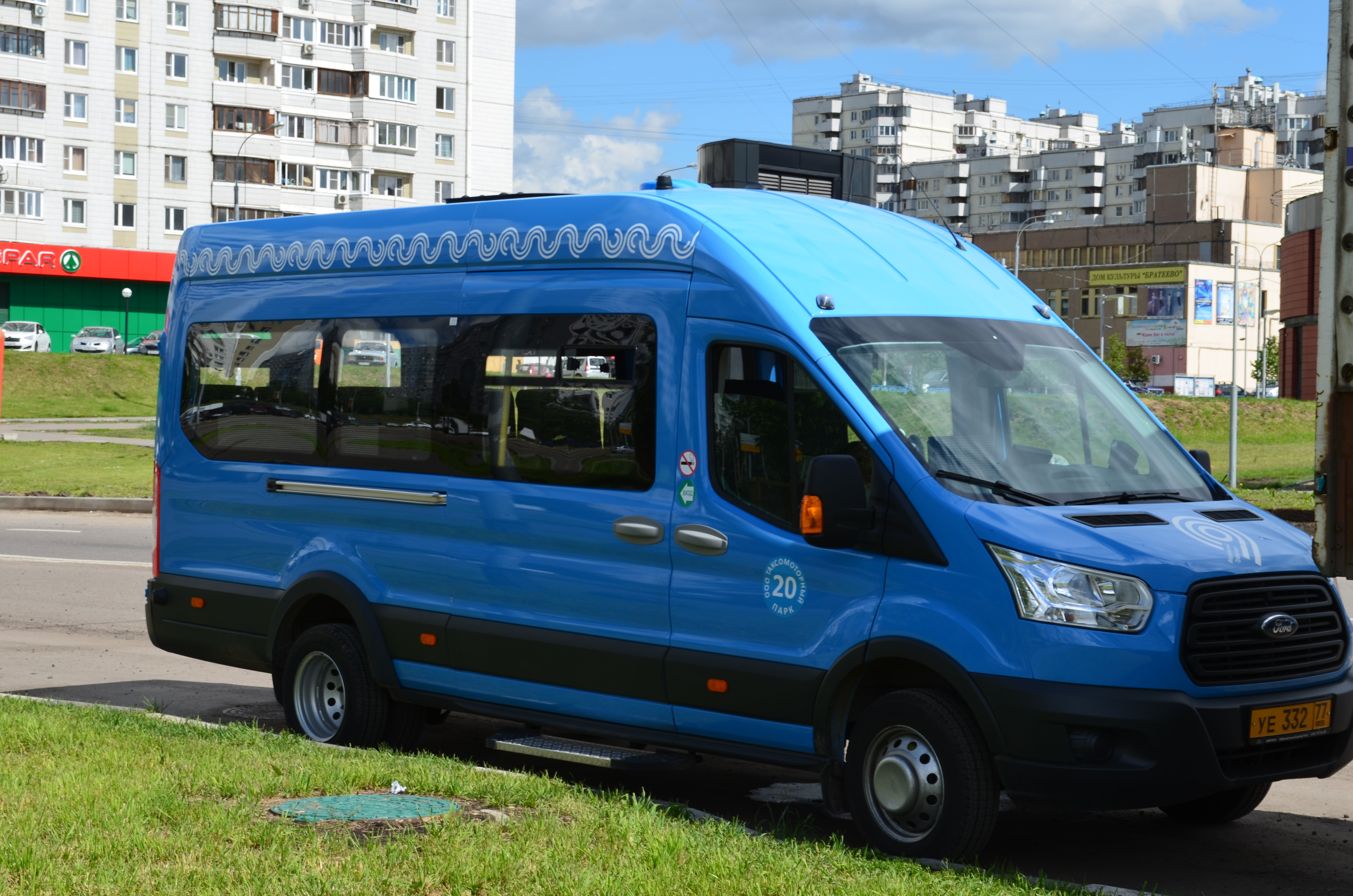
Marshrutka in Moscow

==== Switzerland ====
Major providers of share taxis in Switzerland are Telebus Kriens LU, Taxito, myBuxi, Kollibri by Swiss Postal Bus, and Pikmi by VBZ Verkehrsbetriebe Zurich ZH.

==== United Kingdom ====
In 2018, Arriva launched shared taxi service Arriva Click in Liverpool and Sittingbourne and Kent Science Park in the United Kingdom.

===== Northern Ireland =====
In some towns in Northern Ireland, notably certain districts in Ballymena, Belfast, Derry and Newry, share taxi services operate using Hackney carriages and are called black taxis. These services developed during The Troubles as public bus services were often interrupted due to street rioting. Taxi collectives are closely linked with political groups – those operating in Catholic areas with Sinn Féin, those in Protestant areas with loyalist paramilitaries and their political wings.

Typically, fares approximate those of Translink operated bus services on the same route. Service frequencies are typically higher than on-bus services, especially at peak times, although limited capacities mean that passengers living close to the termini may find it difficult to find a black taxi with seats available in the rush hour.

=== North America ===
==== Barbados ====
Most areas of Barbados are served by ZRs, which run in addition to the government-run bus service.

==== Dominican Republic ====
In the Dominican Republic, share taxis, (called carros públicos, carrito–conchos, carritos, or conchos) are privately owned vehicles running fixed routes with no designated stops.

Foreign Affairs and International Trade Canada advises against traveling in the Dominican Republic carros públicos because they are "often unregulated and poorly maintained". In 2013, the United States Department of State also warned that using them was hazardous, due to pickpockets, and because passengers could be robbed by the drivers themselves; however as of 2026 they do not issue such an advisory. According to the Dominican Ministry of Tourism, share taxis are more comfortable than urban buses (known as guaguas) but passengers are packed in tightly.

==== Haiti ====
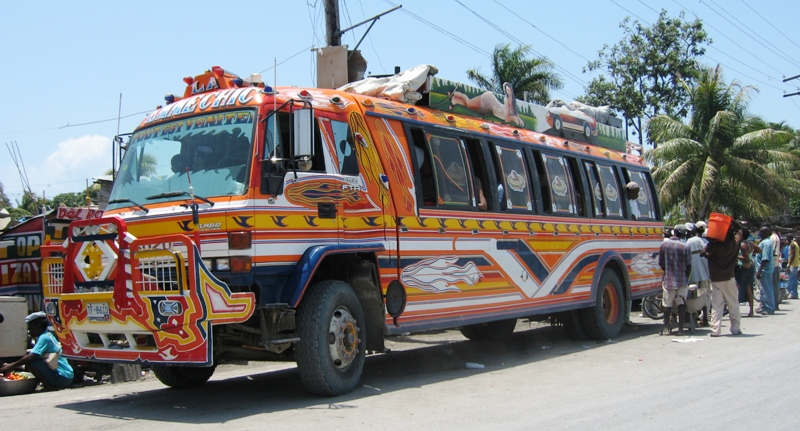
A Haitian tap tap

Tap taps, gaily painted buses or pick-up trucks, and publiques, usually older saloon cars, serve as share taxis in Haiti. Tap taps are privately owned and ornately decorated. They follow fixed routes; won't leave until filled with passengers; and many feature wild colors, portraits of famous people, and intricate, hand-cut wooden window covers. Often they are painted with religious names or slogans. Riders can disembark at any point in the journey. Their name refers to "fast motion".

The publiques operate on fixed routes and pick up additional passengers all along the way.

While saying not to use any form of public transport in Haiti, the Foreign Affairs and International Trade Canada advises against tap tap travel especially. The United States Department of State also warns travelers not to use tap taps, "because they are often overloaded, mechanically unsound, and driven unsafely."

==== Saint Lucia ====
In Saint Lucia, waychehs are a name for minibus public transports using Toyota HiAce.

==== Canada ====
In Vancouver, British Columbia, Canada, in the 1920s, jitneys competed directly with the streetcar monopoly operating along the same routes as the streetcars, but jitneys were charging lower fares.

In Quebec, share taxis or jitneys are called taxis collectifs (in English "shared taxis") or transport collectif par taxi, literally "public transport by taxi". (which the STM translates in English as "taxibus") and are operated by subcontractors to the local transit authorities on fixed routes.

In the case of Montréal, the fare is the same as the local bus fare, but no cash and transfers are issued or accepted; in the case of the STL, only bus passes. The Réseau de transport de Longueuil accepts regular RTL tickets and all RTL and some Réseau de transport métropolitain TRAM passes.

==== Guatemala ====
In Guatemala, ruleteros, minibus share taxis, pick up and discharge passengers along major streets.

==== Mexico ====
There are some areas in which traditional buses and minibuses cannot operate due to the size restrictions of the streets and overhanging objects. Some of these places are served by share taxis that are regulated by the state or city. The share taxis charge the standard minibuses fare. Often share taxi routes in Mexico are ad hoc arrangements to fill in gaps in regular public transportation, and many operate inter-city as well as local routes. In many rural areas, they are the only public transportation.

In some cases, truck/taxi combination vehicles have evolved to transport light goods as well as passengers. Heavily used share taxi routes often evolve into regulated microbus public transit routes, as has occurred in Mexico City and also in Lima.

==== United States ====
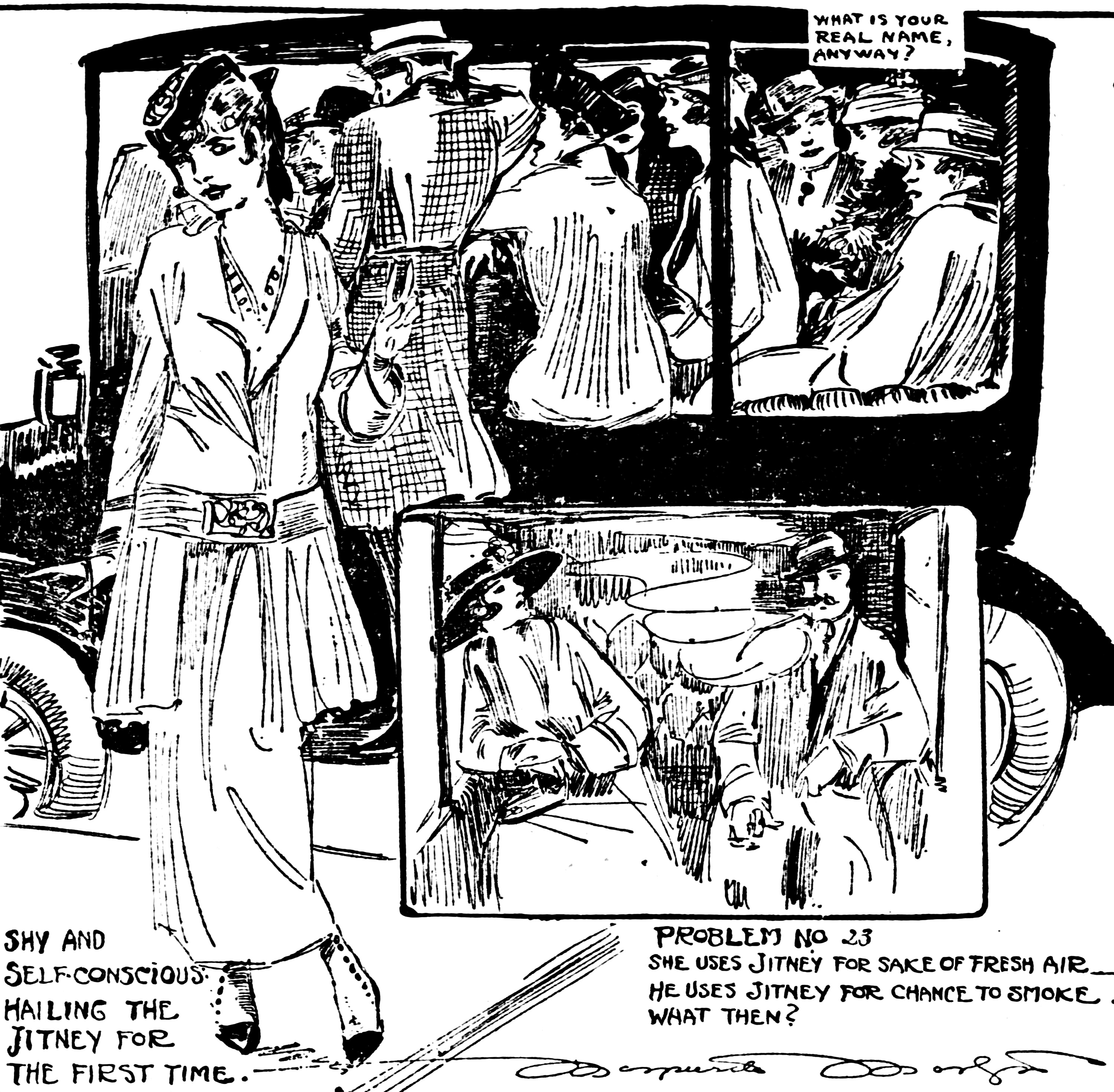
Cartoon by Marguerite Martyn of a jitney cab and passengers in 1915 St. Louis, Missouri

In the United States, share taxis are called jitneys or dollar vans. They are typically modified passenger vans, and often operate in urban neighborhoods that are underserved by public mass transit or taxis. Some are licensed and regulated, while others operate illegally. They operate at designated stops or can be hailed from the street.

Both common names – dollar van and jitney – originated similarly. Jitney is an archaic term for an American nickel, the common fare for early jitneys. In the late 20th century, when a typical fare was one dollar, the corresponding name came into usage, though "jitney" is still also common. It is generally a small-capacity vehicle that follows a rough service route, but it can go slightly out of its way to pick up and drop off passengers. In many US cities such as Pittsburgh and Detroit, the term jitney refers to an unlicensed taxi cab.

They are often owned and used by members of inner-city communities, such as African/Caribbean American, Latino, and Asian-American populations. Travelers cite cost and greater frequency as factors in choosing jitneys over larger bus service, whereas safety and comfort are cited for choosing buses.

The first jitneys in the United States operated in Los Angeles, California in 1914. By 1915, there were 62,000 nationwide. Local regulations, demanded by streetcar companies, forced jitneys out of business in most places. By the end of 1916, only 6,000 jitneys remained. Operators were referred to as "jitney men." They were so successful that the city government banned them at the request of the streetcar operators.

===== Atlanta =====
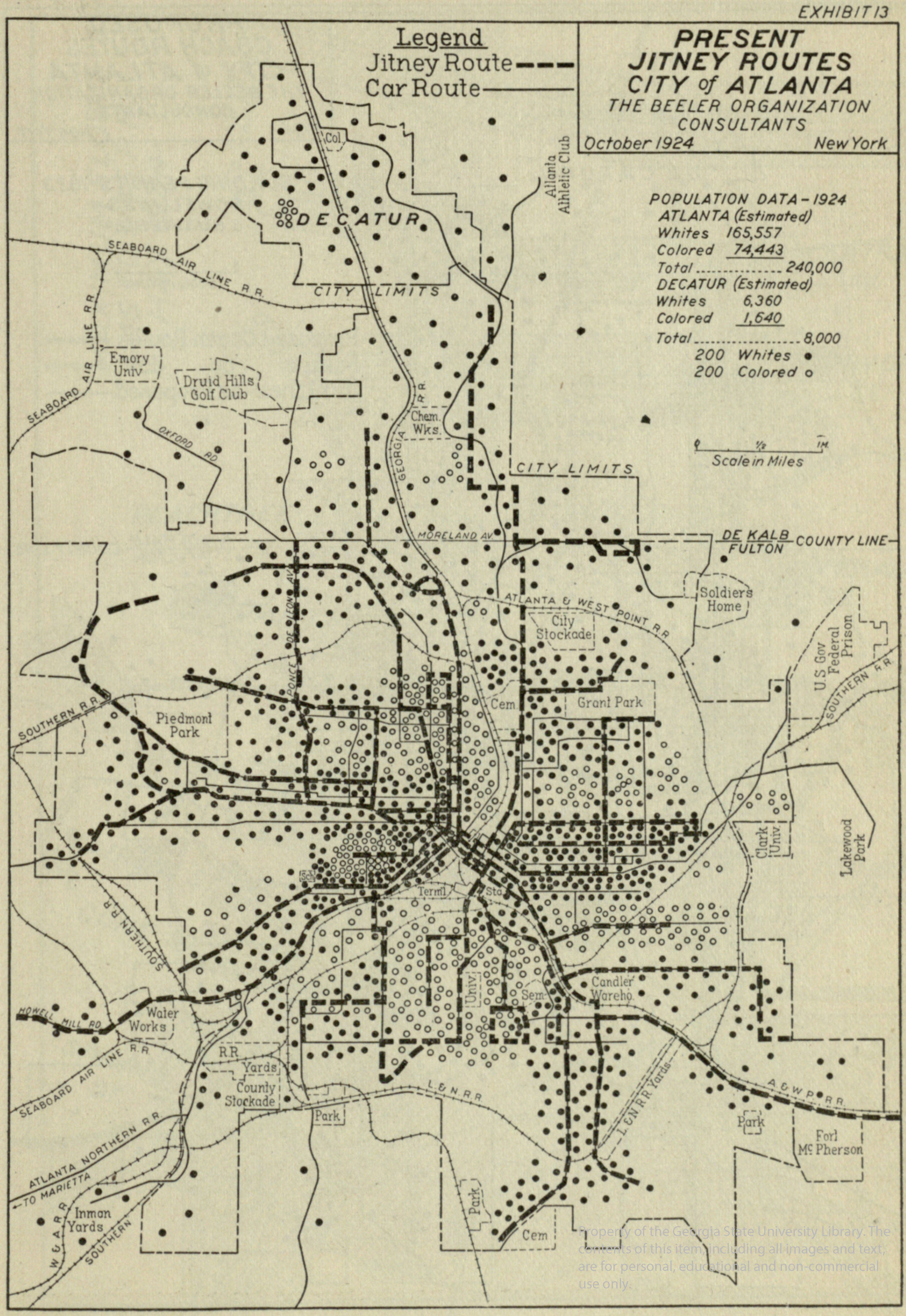
1924 map of jitney routes in Atlanta

Jitneys were popular in Atlanta from 1915 to 1925 as an alternative to streetcars. In Atlanta, jitneys run along Buford Highway.

===== Houston =====
The Houston Wave, Houston's first jitney service in 17 years, operated between 2009 and 2019. It expanded into a network of buses operating within Loop 610 and to all special event venues in Houston.

===== Miami =====
In Miami, jitneys (also known as the Miami Mini Bus) run through various neighborhoods, mostly those stretching between Downtown Miami to The Mall at 163rd Street in North Miami Beach, Florida. Miami has the country's most comprehensive jitney network, due to Caribbean influence.

===== New Jersey =====
In New Jersey, 6,500 jitney buses are registered, and are required to have an "Omnibus" license plate, which denotes the vehicle's federal registration. They are also required to undergo inspection by the state MVC mobile inspection team on the vehicles' companies' property twice a year, and be subject to surprise inspection. Drivers of jitneys are required to qualify for a Class B or Class C Commercial Drivers License (CDL), depending on whether the vehicle seats up to 15 or 30 passengers. Violations against a driver's CDL must be resolved and result in payment of fines prior to resumption of driving on the driver's part, with retesting required if the driver waits longer than three years to resolve the issues.

Denser urban areas of northern New Jersey, such as Hudson, Bergen and Passaic County, are also served by dollar vans, which are commonly known as jitneys, and most of which are run by Spanish Transportation and Community Line, Inc. Nungessers, along the Anderson Avenue-Bergenline Avenue transit corridor is a major origination/termination point, as are 42nd Street in Manhattan, Newport Mall and Five Corners in Jersey City, and GWB Plaza in Fort Lee. These interstate vans are under the purview of the federal government.

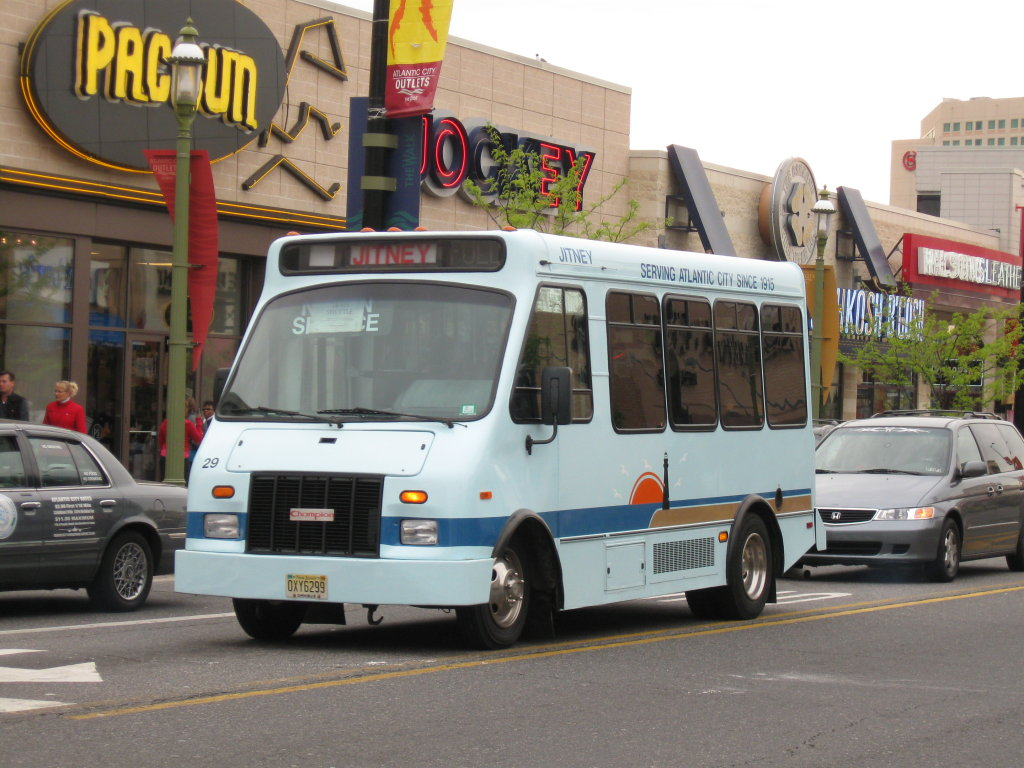
Jitney in Atlantic City, United States in 2008

In Atlantic City the Atlantic City Jitney Association operates a jitney service that travels the main strip of casinos. One of the routes also services the new cluster of casinos west of Atlantic City proper.

Hudson County commuters who prefer NJ Transit buses, for example, cite senior citizen discounts and air conditioning among their reasons, which has led some jitney operators to display bumper stickers advertising air conditioning aboard their vehicles in order to lure passengers. Some who prefer the buses will nonetheless take the jitneys if they arrive before the buses, as they pass bus stops more frequently than the buses and are cheaper. Others choose buses because, they claim, jitney drivers are less safe, and are prone to using cell phones and playing loud music while driving. Although Union City jitney driver Samuel Martinez has complained that authorities unfairly target them and not the larger buses, North Bergen Patrol Commander Lt. James Somers has contended that jitneys are less safe, and sometimes exhibit higher levels of aggressive driving in order to pick up passengers, which has led to arguments among drivers. Somers also stated that police can only stop a vehicle that appears to have an obvious problem, and that only certified inspectors from the state MVC can stop a vehicle for less apparent, more serious problems.

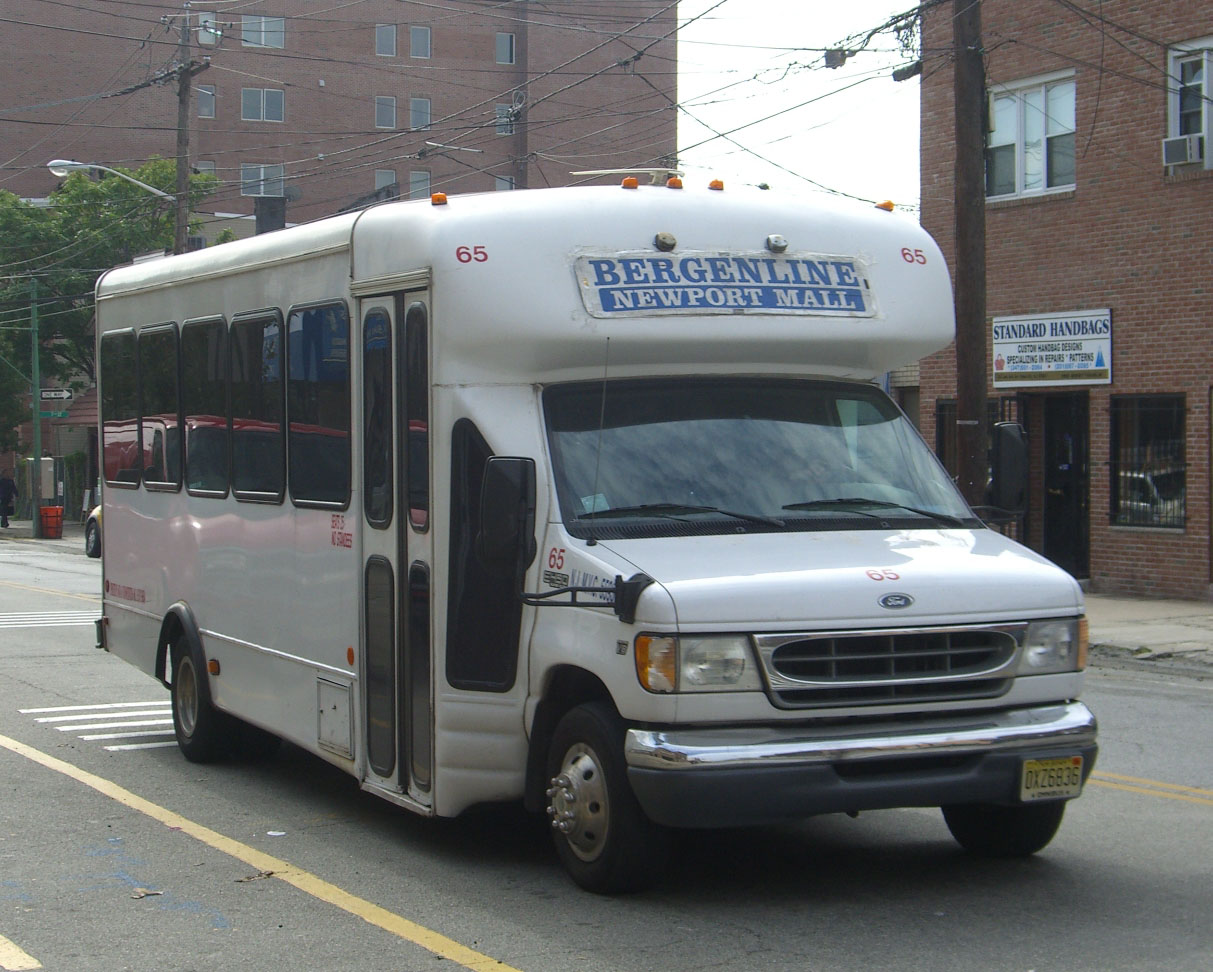
A dollar van in Union City, New Jersey, 2009

Dollar vans may change ownership over the course of decades, and the mostly immigrant drivers are subject to police searches. Between 1994 and 2015, the TLC issued 418 van licenses, although the vast majority of vans are unlicensed. Licensed vans cannot pick up at New York City bus stops, and all pick-ups must be predetermined and all passengers logged. Additionally, in the 1980s and 1990s, the predominantly black and mostly immigrant dollar van drivers stated that they were harassed "day and night" by the New York City Police Department (NYPD), with some van drivers having their keys confiscated and thrown away by NYPD officers.

Over the course of the 2000s, surprise inspections in Hudson County, New Jersey, have been imposed on jitney operators, whose lack of regulation, licensing or regular scheduling has been cited as the cause for numerous fines. A series of such inspections of the vans on Bergenline Avenue in June 2010 resulted in 285 citation violations, including problems involving brake lights, bald tires, steering wheels, suspensions, exhaust pipes, and emergency doors welded shut. An early July 2010 surprise inspection by the Hudson County Prosecutor's Office, which receives federal funding for regulating jitneys, found 23 out of 33 jitneys to be unsafe, which were taken out of service. Claims have also been made that jitneys cause congestion and undermine licensed bus service. Drivers of these vans have also developed a reputation for ignoring traffic laws in the course of competing for fares, picking up and dropping off passengers at random locations, and driving recklessly.

On July 30, 2013, an accident occurred at 56th Street and Boulevard East in West New York, New Jersey, in which Angelie Paredes, an 8-month-old North Bergen resident, was killed in her stroller when a full-sized jitney bus belonging to the New York-based Sphinx company toppled a light pole. The driver, Idowu Daramola of Queens, was arrested and charged with a number of offenses, including using a cell phone while driving. Officials also stated that he was speeding; however, this was later disputed by an investigator to the scene who concluded that there was insufficient evidence to determine the speed of the bus. At an August 6 press conference, legislators including U.S. Representative Albio Sires, New Jersey State Senator Nicholas Sacco, State Assembly members Vincent Prieto, Charles Mainor and Angelica Jimenez, West New York Mayor Felix Roque, Weehawken Mayor Richard Turner, Guttenberg Mayor Gerald Drasheff, Freeholder Junior Maldonado and Hudson County Sheriff Frank Schillari, noted that problems with jitneys existed since the 1980s, and called for stricter regulations for drivers and bus companies. This included increased monitoring and enforcement, and heightened participation by the public in identifying poor drivers, as jitneys had been exempt from regulations imposed on buses and other forms of transportation.

In February 2014, New Jersey Governor Chris Christie signed Angelie's Law, strengthening regulations on commuter buses.

Several companies run vans in Northern New Jersey, often following similar routes to New Jersey Transit buses but at a slightly lower price and greater frequency. The most common routes have an eastern terminus on street level in Manhattan, either near the Port Authority Bus Terminal or the George Washington Bridge Bus Station. Often, several different companies ply the same route.

===== New York City =====
In New York City, dollar vans serve major areas that lack adequate subway service in transit deserts. The vans pick up and drop off anywhere along a route, and payment is made at the end of a trip. During periods when limited public mass transit is unavailable, dollar vans were the only feasible method of transportation for many commuters. In such situations, city governments may pass legislation to deter price gouging. Most dollar vans operate illegally, due to possible rules and fines. Dollar vans and other jitneys mainly serve low-income, immigrant communities in transit deserts, which lack sufficient bus and subway service.

===== San Francisco =====
Jitneys ran in San Francisco from late 1914 to January 2016. In the 1910s, there were more than 1,400 jitneys operating in the city. However, by 2016, declining ridership combined with mounting penalties for traffic citations made the operations unprofitable.

==== Puerto Rico ====
In Puerto Rico and the Dominican Republic, "carros públicos" (literally "public cars") are share taxis. Carros Publicos set routes with several passengers sharing the ride and others picked up throughout the journey.

In Puerto Rico the industry is regulated by the Puerto Rico Public Service Commission.

While these cars do travel inter-city, they may not be available for longer, cross-island travel. Stations may exist in cities, and Puerto Rican carros públicos may congregate in specific places around town.

=== South America ===
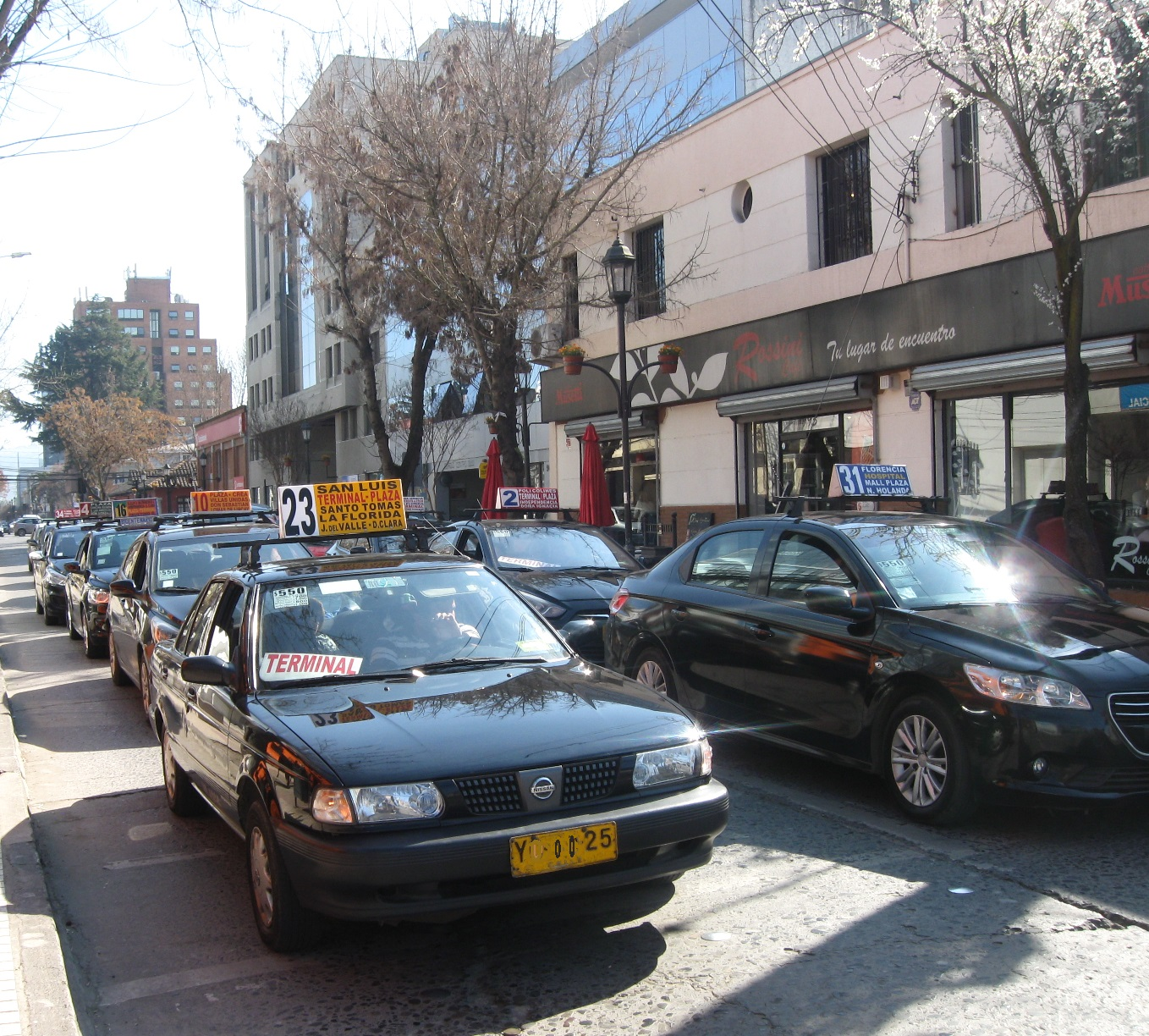
Taxis Colectivos of different lines in Talca, Chile

Taxis colectivos are found in Peru, Chile, and Argentina, where they are most commonly referred to simply as colectivos, although in some places they have become essentially standard buses.

==== Argentina ====
Colectivos operated as share taxis from the late 1920s until the 1950s in Buenos Aires, Argentina when they were integrated into the public transportation system. Vehicles still known as colectivos operate throughout the country, but have long been indistinguishable from buses.
