= Public minibus =

Minibus used for public transport services in Samarinda

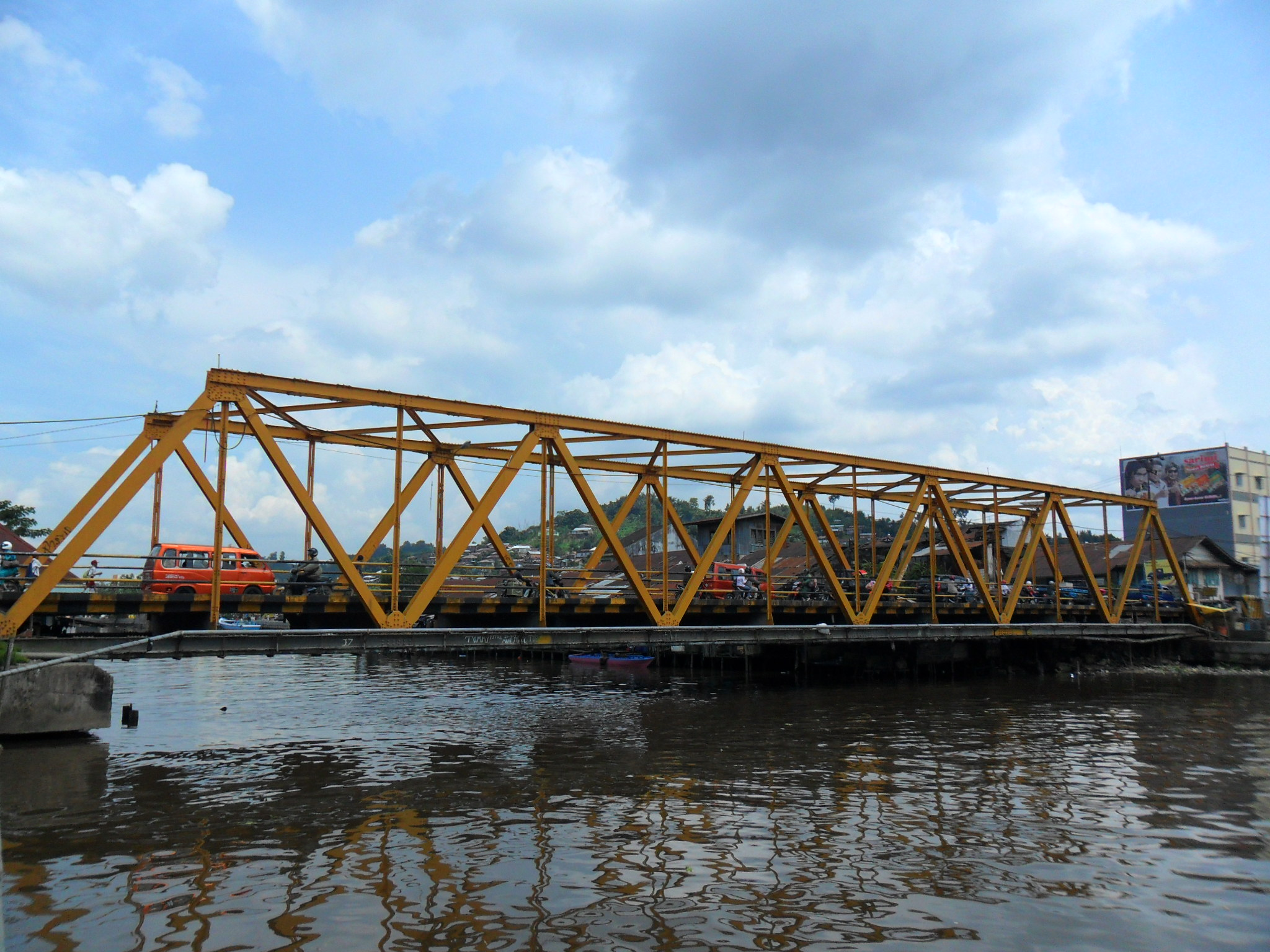
Orange public minibus crossing a bridge at Sei Dama

A public minibus (PM) is a common public mode of transport in Samarinda. It mainly serves the area that standard Samarinda bus lines do not reach. It is colloquially known as a minibus or, in Indonesian, a Taksi. It is defined as a kind of share taxi.

Minibuses carry a maximum of 8 seated passengers; no standing passengers are allowed. Minibuses typically offer a fast and efficient transportation solution due to their small size, limited carrying capacity, frequency and diverse range of routes.

== Overview ==
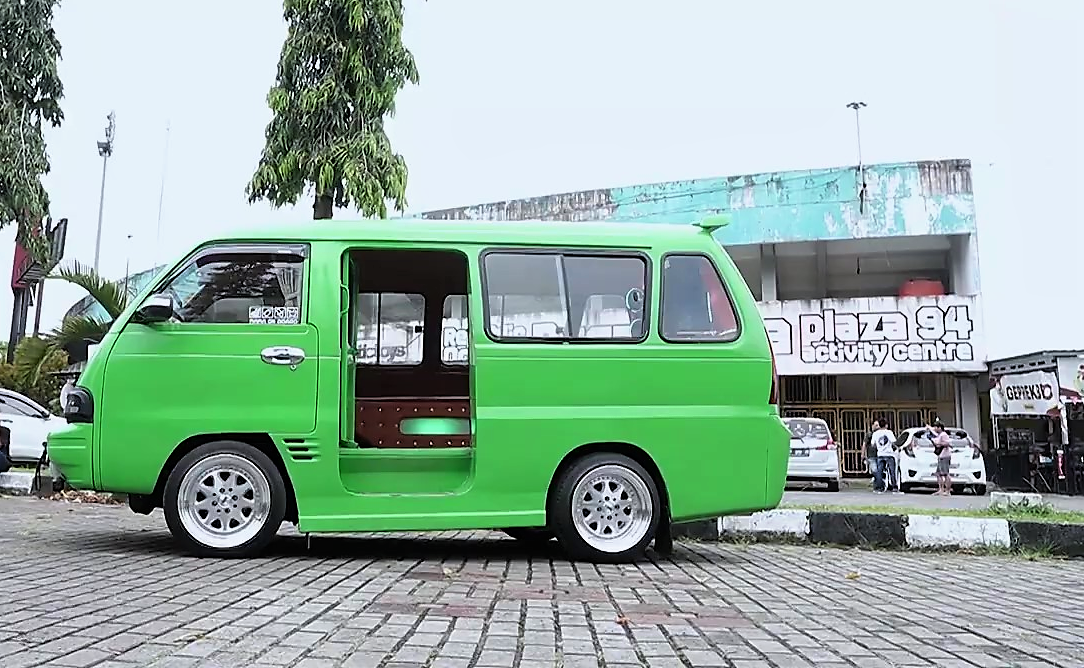
Green public minibus

Minibuses in Samarinda are distinguished by the colours, which denote different routes. Most of the minibuses run on Petrol.

The industry is regulated by the Samarinda Transport Department. By 2006, there were 1,522 public minibuses in Samarinda.

A passenger wishing to get on a minibus simply hails the minibus from the street kerb like a taxi. To alight from a minibus, a passenger customarily calls out to the driver where they wish to get off.

The minibus operate a non-scheduled service, with fixed routes. Passengers pay just before they alight, and change for cash payment may be available, or may have a small amount deducted off the amount of change for the inconvenience (of giving change).

== Fleet ==
The Suzuki Carry are the most popular types of minibuses in Samarinda, they replaced the American model (conversions of Willys Jeeps) and Japanese model (Mitsubishi Delica Colt T120, introduced in 1975). The American model served Pasar Pagi, Jembatan 3 (Ahmad Dahlan Road), Segiri Market, Karang Asam and Handelmaatschappij Borneo Samarinda.

== See also ==
- Share taxi, for more international equivalents to public minibuses
