= Vespa (disambiguation) =

Vespa is a line of motor scooters manufactured by Piaggio.

Vespa may also refer to:

== Other vehicles ==
- Vespa 400, a Piaggio-made microcar (1957–1961)
- Vickers Vespa, a 1920s British aircraft
- Caproni Vespa armoured car, a 1942 Italian prototype

== Science ==
- Vespa (constellation)
- Vespa (genus), the true hornets
- 6062 Vespa, an asteroid

== Other uses ==
- Vespa (horse) (foaled 1830), a British racehorse
- Princess Vespa, a Spaceballs character

== People with the surname Vespa ==
- Amleto Vespa (1884 – c. 1943), Italian mercenary and spy
- Bruno Vespa (born 1944), Italian journalist
- Jeff Vespa (born 1970), American photographer
- Líber Vespa (1971–2018), Uruguayan footballer

== See also ==
- Vesta (disambiguation)
