= Vestale =

Vestale, La vestale or La Vestale may refer to:

- French ship Vestale, various French Navy vessels named Vestale or La Vestale
- La vestale (Mercadante), an 1840 opera by Italian composer Saverio Mercadante
- La vestale (Spontini), an 1807 French-language opera by Italian composer Gaspare Spontini
- La vestale, an 1810 opera by Vincenzo Pucitta

== See also ==
- Vestal (disambiguation)
