= GAZ-67 =

Soviet military vehicle

GAZ-67 / GAZ-67B (ГАЗ-67 / ГАЗ-67Б)
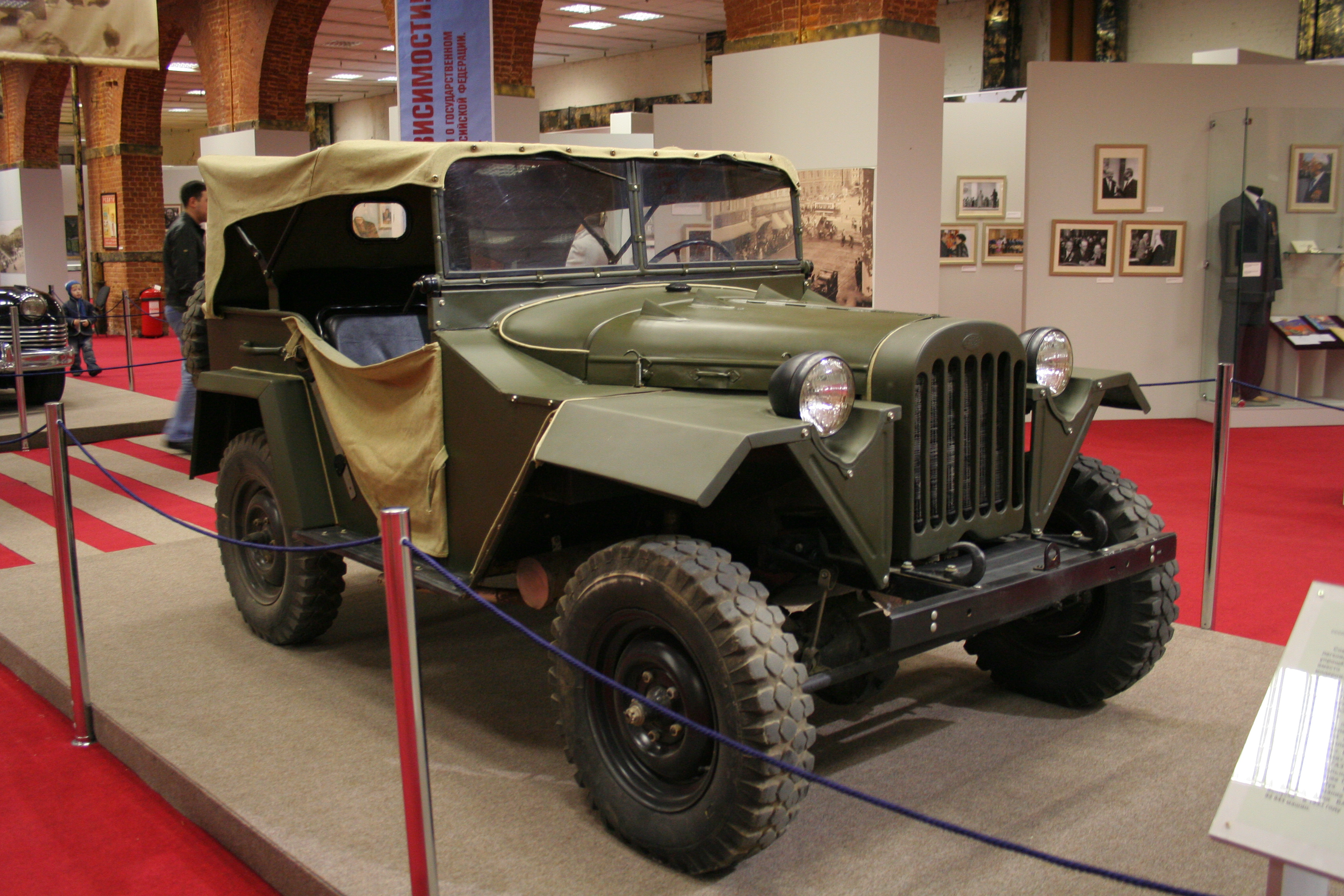

Overview
- Manufacturer: GAZ
- Production: 1943–1953; 92,843 produced
- Assembly: Soviet Union: Gorky, Ulyanovsk

Body and chassis
- Body style: Jeep
- Layout: Front-engine, four-wheel-drive
- Related: GAZ-64; BA-64; GAZ-69

Powertrain
- Engine: 3.3L 4-cylinder gasoline 54 hp (GAZ-67); 54 hp (GAZ-67B)

Dimensions
- Wheelbase: 2,100 mm (82.7 in)
- Length: 3,345 mm (131.7 in)
- Width: 1,685 mm (66.3 in)
- Height: 1,700 mm (66.9 in)
- Curb weight: 1,320 kg (2,910 lb)

Chronology
- Predecessor: GAZ-64
- Successor: GAZ-69

The GAZ-67 and the GAZ-67B (from January 1944) were general-purpose four-wheel drive Soviet military vehicles built by GAZ starting in 1943. By the end of the war, it was the Soviet equivalent of the World War II jeep.

The GAZ-67 was a further development of the earlier GAZ-64. To increase the speed of production, standard components from other trucks were used, including the engine, gearbox, and gas tank from the GAZ-MM, the radiator from the GAZ-AAA, and electrical system from the GAZ-M1, and other parts (including the brakes and steering mechanism) from the GAZ-61-40.

A main improvement over the earlier GAZ-64 was a wider track of 1446 mm. It also had a strengthened chassis frame, enlarged fuel tank and other improvements. It was powered by a slightly more powerful 54 hp (40 kW) version of GAZ M1 4-cylinder 3280 cc gasoline motor, and had a top speed of 90 km/h (56 mph). Production started on 23 September 1943 (the first serial vehicle produced).

From January 1944 it was replaced by the GAZ-67B, which had further mechanical improvements such as a lengthened (1.85 m) wheelbase and more powerful engine (54 hp). This was the primary model produced.

92,843 GAZ-67 & GAZ-67B trucks were produced between September 1943 and August 1953. It was also used by the Ministry of the Interior for forestry and agriculture, and as snowplows for clearing roads. The GAZ-67B served as the basis of the BKGM-AN hydraulic drilling and crane truck as well as the BA-64B armored car. It was not uncommon to see them in civilian use into the 1970s in Moscow.

The GAZ-67 was replaced by the GAZ-69.

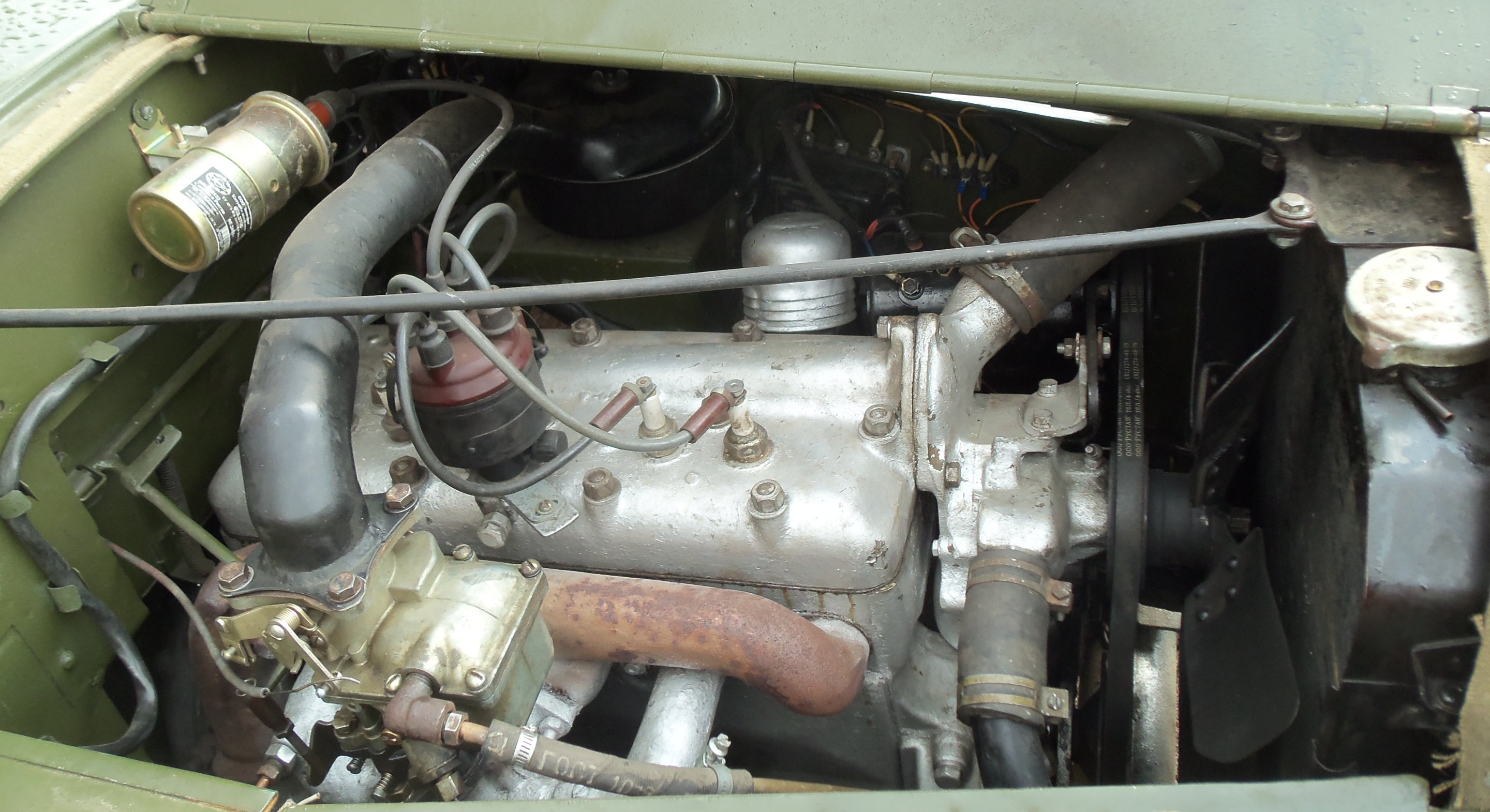
GAZ-67B engine

== Sources ==
- Evgeniy Prochko, Vezdekhody RKKA, 1998, Armada series, ISBN 5-85729-015-5
