= Vesta =

Vesta may refer to:

== Brands and products ==
- Lada Vesta, a car from Russian car manufacturer AVTOVAZ
- Swan Vesta (began 1883), a brand of matches
  - Vesta case, for matches
- Vesta, a UK freeze-dried meal brand owned by Premier Foods

== Fiction and mythology ==
- Sailor Vesta, a character in Sailor Moon
- Vesta (Marvel Comics), a character
- Vesta (goddess), Roman goddess of the hearth and home

== People ==
- Vesta Stoudt (1891–1966), US worker whose suggestion prompted duct tape
- Vesta (1957–2011), stage name of US singer Vesta Williams

== Music ==
- Vesta (album), 1986, by Vesta Williams
- Vesta 4 U, 1988 album by Vesta Williams
- Vesta, a 2008 rock band of former The Juliana Theory members

== Places ==
- Monte Vesta, Lombardy, Italy
- Temple of Vesta, Rome, Italy
- Vesta Nunataks, Alexander Island, Antarctica

=== Canada ===
- Vesta Creek (Alberta), a stream
- Vesta Creek (Ontario), a stream in Bruce County

=== United States ===
- Vesta, Arkansas
- Vesta, Georgia
- Vesta, Minnesota
- Vesta, Nebraska
- Vesta, Virginia
- Vesta, Washington

== Science and technology ==
- Vesta family, group of asteroids
  - 4 Vesta, a member of the Vesta family
- Vesta (rocket), France
- Vesta, IBM file system preceding GPFS
- Vesta (software configuration management), Compaq, 1993
- Vesta, a genus of flowering plant in the family Araceae
  - Vesta longifolia, sole species of the genus Vesta
- Vestas, Danish wind turbine manufacturer

== Other uses ==
- HMS Vesta, a schooner of the Royal Navy
- IF Vesta, sports club in Uppsala, Sweden established in 1911
- SS Vesta (1853–1875), a French iron screw steamer
- Vesta (name), feminine given name
- Vesta Rowing Club (founded 1870), London, England
- Vesta Battery Corporation (1897–1964), an automobile battery company

== See also ==
- Vestal (disambiguation)
