= Caproni Vespa armoured car =

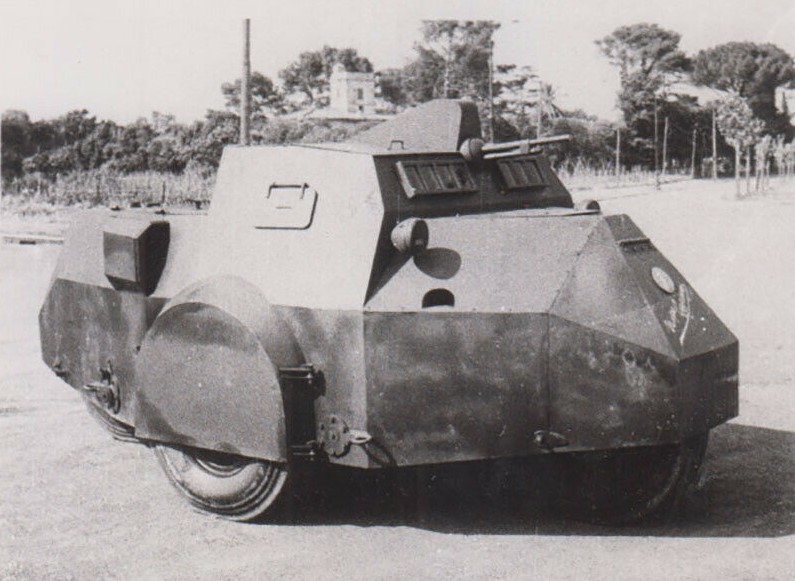
- Place of origin: Italy

Production history
- Designer: Caproni
- Manufacturer: Caproni
- No. built: 1

Specifications
- Mass: 3.4 ton
- Length: 3.9 m (12 ft 10 in)
- Width: 2 m (6 ft 7 in)
- Height: 1.85 m (6 ft 1 in)
- Crew: 2
- Armour: 26 mm frontal armour 14 mm side armour
- Main armament: 8mm Breda 38 machine gun
- Engine: 82 hp (61 kW)
- Power/weight: 24.12 hp/ton
- Operational range: 200 km (120 mi)
- Maximum speed: 86 km/h (53 mph)

The Caproni Vespa armoured car was an Italian military vehicle, designed by the aircraft manufacturer Caproni. Only one prototype was built, which was tested on February 2, 1942 at the Motor Study Center. The vehicle never entered serial production.

The initial idea was to equip the Royal Italian Army with an armoured car that was small, light, agile and fast.

== Characteristics ==
The Caproni Vespa was able to accommodate two crew. Its most striking characteristic was the position of the wheels, which were arranged in rhombus or lozenge configuration: one front and one rear wheel (like a motorcycle), and two central wheels, placed on the sides of the hull; basically a 1x2x1 configuration. This gave the vehicle a particularly small turning radius, useful for an armoured car intended primarily for rapid exploration and reconnaissance.

The Caproni Vespa had an 8-cylinder Lancia Astura 82 horsepower engine, which could reach speeds of 86 km/h with operational range of 200 km on road. It was 3.90 meters long, 2 meters wide and 1.85 meters high. The weight was 3.4 tons, with 26 mm frontal armour and 14 mm side armour. Main armament was a 8mm Breda 38 machine gun.

== See also ==
- Leichter Panzerspähwagen
- Humber light reconnaissance car
- BA-64
