= Vesta (name) =

Vesta is the Roman goddess of the hearth, home, and family.

The given name may also refer to:

People:

- Vesta Hathaway (Marina Oliver, born 1934), British writer
- Vesta Kasputė (born 1984), Lithuanian chess player
- Vesta C. Muehleisen (1889–1973), American educator
- Vesta M. Roy (1925–2002), American politician
- Vesta Stoudt (1891–1966), American factory worker
- Vesta Tilley (Matilda Alice Powles, 1864–1952), English actress
- Vesta Victoria (1873–1951), English actress
- Vesta Williams (1957–2011), American singer

Fictional characters:

- Vesta (Marvel Comics), Marvel Comics character
- Sailor Vesta or VesVes, character in Sailor Moon

== See also ==
- Vesta (disambiguation)
