= BA-64 =

WWII Soviet armoured car

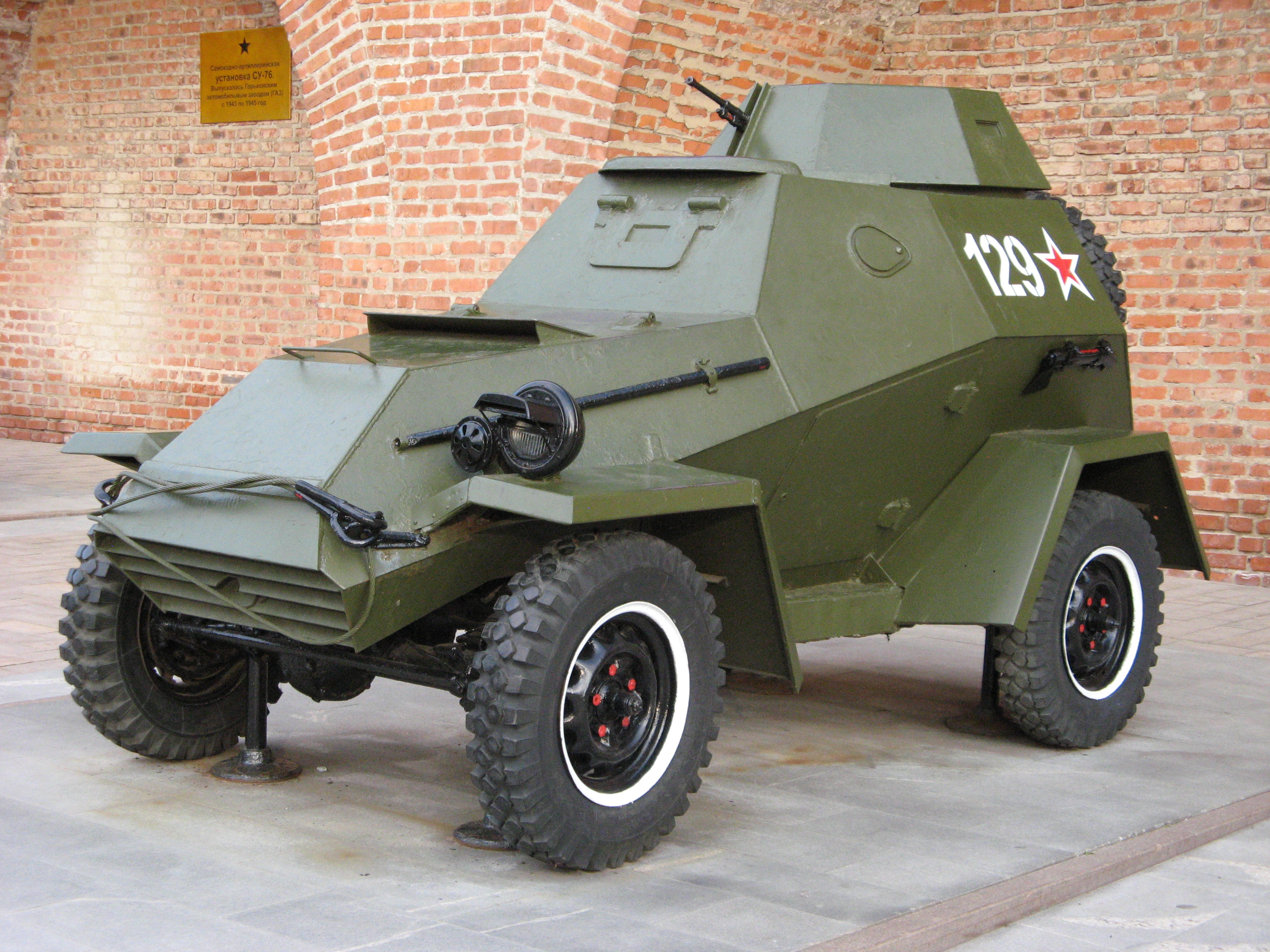
- BA-64B armoured car in Nizhniy Novgorod Kremlin, Russia.
- Type: Armoured Scout Car
- Place of origin: Soviet Union

Service history
- Used by: See Operators
- Wars: World War II; Korean War

Production history
- Designer: Vitaliy Grachev
- Designed: July—November 1941
- Manufacturer: GAZ
- Produced: 1942—1946
- No. built: 9,110
- Variants: See Variants

Specifications
- Mass: 2.4 tonnes (2.6 short tons; 2.4 long tons)
- Length: 3.66 m (12 ft 0 in)
- Width: 1.74 m (5 ft 9 in)
- Height: 1.9 m (6 ft 3 in) (hull)
- Crew: 2 (commander, driver) + 6 passengers (BA-64E only)
- Main armament: 7.62mm DT machine gun (1,070 rounds)
- Engine: GAZ-MM four-cylinder liquid-cooled petrol 50 hp (37 kW) at 2,800 rpm
- Power/weight: 21.2 hp/tonne (15.8 kW/tonne)
- Transmission: 4fwd 1rev
- Ground clearance: 0.21 m (8.3 in)
- Fuel capacity: 90 L (24 US gal)
- Operational range: 500 km (310 miles)
- Maximum speed: 80 km/h (50 mph)

The BA-64 (БА-64, from Russian: Бронированный Автомобиль, Bronirovaniy Avtomobil, literally "armoured car") was a Soviet four-wheeled armoured scout car. Built on the chassis of a GAZ-64 or GAZ-67 jeep, it incorporated a hull loosely modeled after that of the Sd.Kfz. 221. The BA-64 was developed between July and November 1941 to replace the BA-20 then in service with armoured car units of the Red Army. Cheap and exceptionally reliable, it would later become the most common Soviet wheeled armoured fighting vehicle to enter service during World War II, with over 9,000 being manufactured before production ended.

The BA-64 represented an important watershed in Soviet armoured car technology, as its multi-faceted hull gave its crew superior protection from small arms fire and shell fragments than the BA-20. BA-64s also possessed a much higher power-to-weight ratio and the placement of their wheels at the extreme corners of the chassis resulted in exceptional manoeuvrability. Following the adoption of the BTR-40, the Soviet government retired its remaining fleet of BA-64s and exported them as military aid to various nations. In East German service, they served as the basis for the later Garant 30k SK-1. North Korean BA-64s saw action against the United Nations Command during the Korean War.

== History ==
=== Development ===
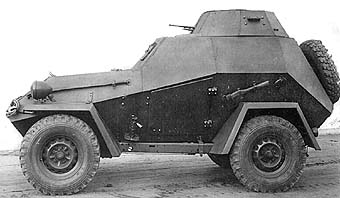
Early BA-64

During the 1930s, the Soviet Union devoted much effort and funding to the development of six-wheeled medium or heavy armoured cars. A primary shortcoming of these vehicles was their lack of all-wheel drive, however, which restricted them to roads. In 1940, the Main Directorate of Soviet Armoured Forces (GABTU), issued a requirement for new armoured car designs which could operate effectively on open terrain and possessed an all-wheel drive chassis. This ushered in the development of several new 4X4 designs, such as the LB-62 and the BA-NATTI. Although these were the first all-wheel drive Soviet armoured cars, neither was accepted for service with the Red Army, as they suffered from excessive weight, fuel consumption, and poor operating range.

During Operation Barbarossa, Nazi Germany's rapid offensives in Ukraine and western Russia temporarily disrupted new military projects as most Soviet factories involved with the production of armoured fighting vehicles were forced to evacuate their facilities and relocate operations east of the Ural Mountains. Gorkovsky Avtomobilny Zavod (GAZ) was one of a few exceptions to the rule, as it was already located east of Moscow. Its contribution to the early Soviet war effort was strategically vital, since it could continue manufacturing vehicles to replace the massive losses then being sustained by the Red Army while the rest of the local defence industry was struggling to relocate and reorganise. GAZ increased its manufacture and assembly of light tanks accordingly, as well as continuing to produce military trucks. Since the programme to mass produce a new all-wheel drive armoured car had been interrupted by the German invasion, it also fell to GAZ to investigate possibilities in that regard.

GAZ technicians initiated concept work on a new armoured car designated Izdeliye 64-125 on July 17, 1941, basing its construction and design on a preexisting light vehicle chassis. This was to ensure the manufacturing process could in be undertaken in an economical and rapid manner. After some deliberation, the GAZ-64 jeep was chosen as the base for the Izdeliye 64-125. This chassis was considered ideal due to its short wheel base and excellent ground clearance, and the fact that its mechanical parts were already in serial production. The original Izdeliye 64-125 bore almost no similarities with what would later become the BA-64; it resembled little more than a shorter BA-20.

On August 23, a captured German Sd.Kfz. 221 scout car was exhibited near Moscow by the Red Army. Vitaliy Grachev and other GAZ engineers were permitted to inspect the vehicle; a month later Grachev arranged to have it brought to the GAZ factory for a detailed analysis. Grachev was impressed by the highly faceted armour plate on the Sd.Kfz. 221, which was angled for maximum ricochet, and he ordered that a similar hull be incorporated into the Izdeliye 64-125. In late November, GAZ assembled the first three prototypes carrying the new hull. Field trials with the Red Army commenced on January 9, 1942. The Izdeliye 64-125 was accepted for service as the BA-64 on March 14, 1942.

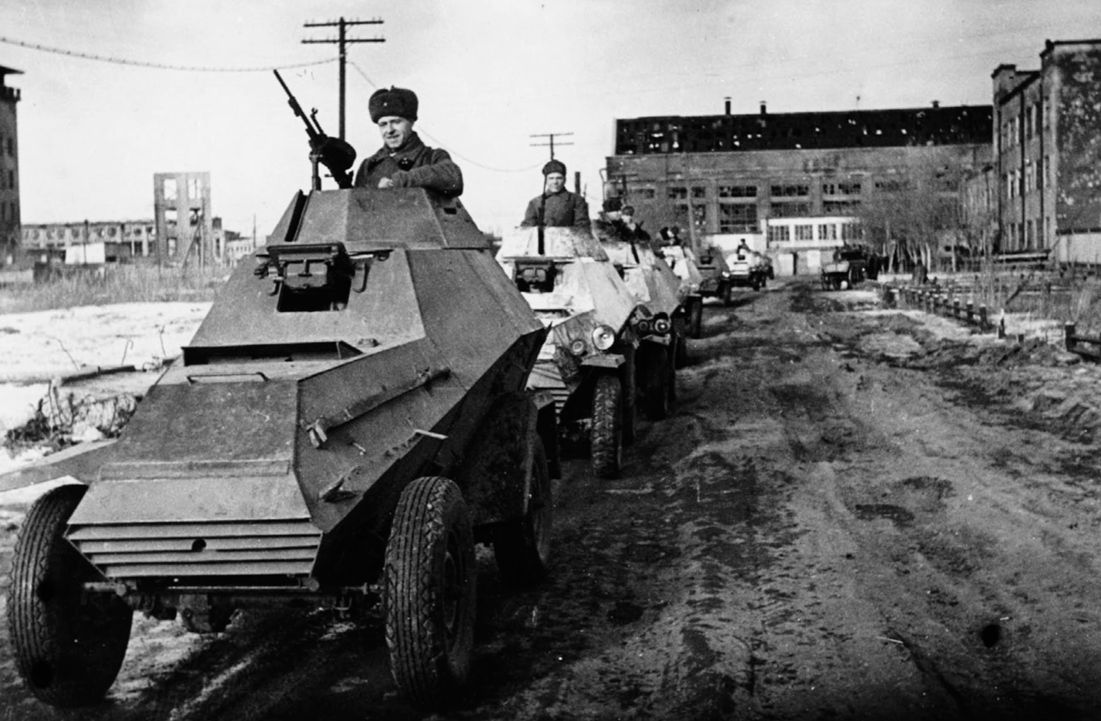
Repaired BA-64s leaving a factory in Stalingrad for the front, February 1943

The BA-64 was initially armed with a single 7.62mm Degtyaryov machine gun in an open-topped turret. The machine gun was mounted on a fixed mount that allowed it to be elevated sufficiently to engage low-flying aircraft. BA-64s started being issued in large numbers to Soviet units in early 1943. Around the same time a specialist driving school was set up to train BA-64 drivers. For reasons still unclear, only fifty armoured cars of this type were manufactured in 1942 and mass production was not undertaken until the first six months of 1943, when over a thousand were manufactured. Even after 1943, production figures remained inconsistent and could fluctuate greatly from year to year. In June 1943, the GAZ workshops that produced the BA-64 were heavily damaged or destroyed by German air raids, and production ceased altogether until the plant could be restored. A few technical shortcomings of the GAZ-64 chassis had to be resolved in that time.

BA-64s remained unique in that they were the only new Soviet armoured car design to be produced during World War II. They had better armour, speed, range, and off-road capability than any other wheeled fighting vehicles in Soviet service, although due to the limitations of the chassis they could only carry a single light machine gun. Unlike the BA-3/6 and BA-10 heavy armoured cars, which were armed with anti-tank cannon, the BA-64 was not considered suitable for front-line combat against German armour. It was, however, widely used for transporting officers, liaison purposes, reconnaissance, and other secondary battlefield tasks.

In September 1943, production of the GAZ-64 was superseded by the improved GAZ-67B jeep, which had a wider track. Consequently, the BA-64 was modified to accommodate the new chassis. This alteration proved to be a major improvement for the BA-64, which was notoriously unstable on slopes due to its narrow track and somewhat top-heavy nature; the wider GAZ-67B track increased the vehicle's side slope angle to 25°. The modified BA-64 was designated BA-64B by the Soviet government. Other detailed improvements included firing ports, a wider range of armament and a new carburetor which gave better performance on low grade fuel. Most BA-64Bs continued to be fitted with the same turret and 7.62mm machine gun as the original series; however, Soviet troops removed some of the original BA-64B turrets and replaced them with PTRS-41 anti-tank rifles or captured German 2 cm KwK 30 cannon. Another, more extensive, field modification involved removing the turret and even part of the upper hull, as well as adding a windshield salvaged from captured Volkswagen Kubelwagen or Schwimmwagens. This converted the BA-64B into an open-topped staff car.

In 1944, GAZ produced a variant of the BA-64B mounting a single 12.7mm DShK heavy machine gun in a larger turret. Although this greatly improved the vehicle's firepower, the turret remained insufficient to adequately rotate the bulky machine gun, and there was not enough space in the hull to accommodate adequate 12.7mm ammunition stowage. Only a small number were manufactured. Another unusual variant, the BA-64ZhD, was produced using surplus, old BA-64 hulls, albeit mounted on the GAZ-67 chassis. It possessed flanged, steel rail wheels which allowed it to patrol railroad tracks.

Production of the BA-64B was severely curtailed by the end of World War II, as the Red Army no longer had any interest in maintaining such large numbers of new armoured cars. The last 62 BA-64Bs were manufactured in mid 1946. Approximately 9,110 BA-64s of all variants were produced in the Soviet Union between 1942 and 1946. Of that figure, about half were fitted with communications equipment, chiefly RP radios, which were inferior to the 71-TK models used in Soviet heavy armoured cars.

After the war, Soviet interest in wheeled armoured vehicles shifted primarily to purpose-built armoured personnel carriers (APCs). Soviet military officials wanted armoured vehicles capable of keeping pace with tanks that could transport infantry to an engagement. As early as mid-March 1943, GAZ had developed an APC variant of the BA-64B, the BA-64E, which could accommodate six passengers. This vehicle was open-topped and the passengers debarked through a door in the rear hull. The BA-64E was rejected as being too small for a practical APC; however, a number of its features would later be incorporated into a new design better able to combine the traditional roles of an armoured car with that of a general transporter: the BTR-40.

GAZ manufactured new parts for the existing BA-64 fleet until 1953, the last year it remained in operational service with the Soviet Armed Forces. Thereafter the BA-64 was superseded by the BTR-40 and subsequently, by the BRDM-1. All the remaining vehicles were placed in storage, and some were gradually disposed of as military aid to Soviet client states, particularly North Korea. Prior to export, the stored BA-64s were refurbished at the same Soviet facilities responsible for the maintenance of the BTR series.

=== Service ===
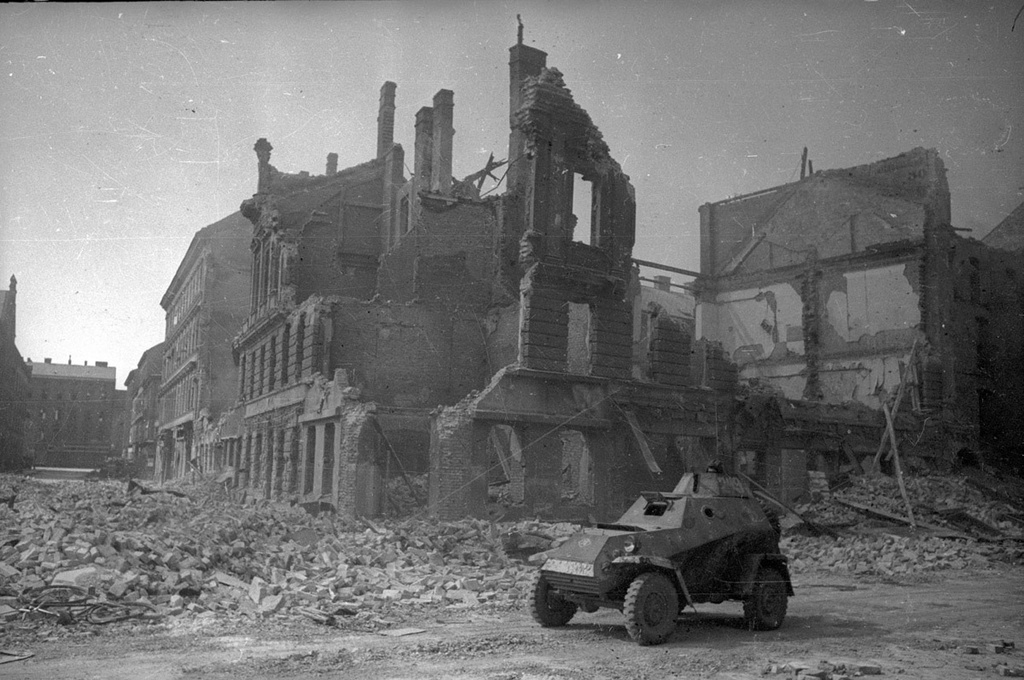
A BA-64 of the 9th Guards Mechanized Corps on the streets of Vienna, April 1945

The first BA-64s produced were deployed to the Don Front in 1942. However, larger quantities were operated by Soviet units on the Voronezh Front and the Bryansk Front from mid to late 1943. BA-64s also took part in the final phases of the Battle of Stalingrad. During prolonged road marches, Soviet crews retrofitted them with standard tread road tyres to save fuel. BA-64Bs were deployed during Soviet offensives in Austria, Germany, Hungary, and Romania, seeing extensive combat during the Second Battle of Kiev and the Battle of Berlin. Eighty-one BA-64Bs were also donated by the Soviets to the Polish People's Army and ten to the 1st Czechoslovak Army Corps. The Czechoslovak BA-64Bs were used in the Prague Offensive of 1945.

During the early to mid 1950s, ex-Soviet BA-64s were shipped to a number of Soviet client states in Eastern Europe and Asia, including Bulgaria, East Germany, Romania, Albania, North Korea, and the People's Republic of China. Small quantities were later also supplied to Yugoslavia. In North Korean service, the BA-64 engaged ground forces of the United Nations Command during the Korean War, where it received the nickname "Bobby" from American soldiers. This was a likely play on the armoured car's Russian nickname, "Bobik".

The last country known to have received BA-64s for its armed forces was North Vietnam, although it is not known whether these saw actual combat during the Vietnam War.

By the 1970s, BA-64s had been retired by all Warsaw Pact armies, being typically donated to paramilitary groups such as the East German Combat Groups of the Working Class, and similar workers' militia units. However, some remained in service with the national armies of North Korea and Albania. In 2013, the Korean People's Army continued to hold a number of BA-64s in reserve.

== Description ==
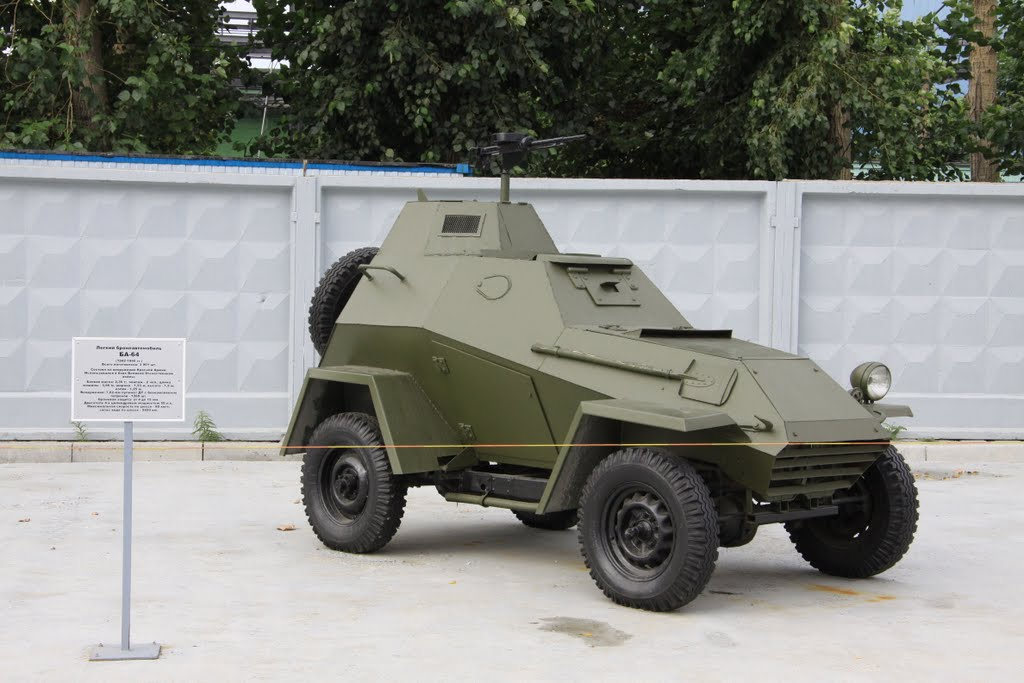
BA-64 at the UMMC Museum

The BA-64 consisted of the chassis of a GAZ-64 or GAZ-67 jeep modified to accept an armoured hull. The jeep chassis required some alterations to accept the hull; for example, the cooling, fuel, and electrical systems had to be relocated while the rear suspension was braced to accommodate the additional weight. Suspension consists of semi-elliptical springs front and rear, and steering is restricted to the front wheels. A BA-64's gearbox initially had one reverse and three forward gears on a two-speed transfer case, although a few models appear to have one reverse and four forward gears and no transfer case.

All BA-64 hulls were of all-welded steel construction and varied in armour thickness from 15mm on the hull front to 6mm on the hull sides. To provide maximum ballistic protection, most armour plates were angled at approximately 30°. Both the driving and engine compartments were located at the front of the hull. The crew members are seated in tandem, with the turret gunner seated behind and above the driver. The driving compartment is fitted with a one-piece hatch cover opening upwards. When the hatch is closed during combat, the driver continues to navigate via a triplex auxiliary sight. The sight was developed from a similar device on the T-60 light tank.

Both the BA-64 and BA-64B were powered by a four-cylinder GAZ petrol engine developing 50 hp (37 kW) at 2,800 rpm. The engine was particularly reliable and known for operating for extended periods even on low octane fuel and poor quality oil with minimal maintenance. Under wartime conditions it was capable of providing good operational service up to 15,000 kilometres without needing major repair. The BA-64 could be fitted with bullet-proof GK combat tyres, although these resulted in higher fuel consumption and reduced road speeds to 40 km/h. Red Army mechanics typically fitted standard tires from the GAZ-M1 passenger car with civilian tread to the BA-64 for use in convoys, long-distance road marches, and rearguard duties.

An open-topped turret was fitted as standard to the BA-64 series, with a 7.62mm light machine gun mounted on a pintle to the right. The machine gun mount was designed for maximum elevation so it could engage low-flying aircraft or infantry in the upper floors of a building during urban combat. A very small number of BA-64s were fitted with a 12.7mm heavy machine gun in a larger, open-topped turret. This model included splash guards and armoured fillets on the hull roofline. Personal crew weapons, such as hand grenades, were also stored inside the vehicle's hull.

The BA-64 underwent some minor modifications as the BA-64B. While the most noticeable of these changes were the new carburetor and the wider track, successive models of BA-64Bs also included firing ports, cylindrical sheet metal exhaust shields, an additional air intake atop the engine compartment, and an air intake for the driving compartment on the hull roof.

== Variants ==
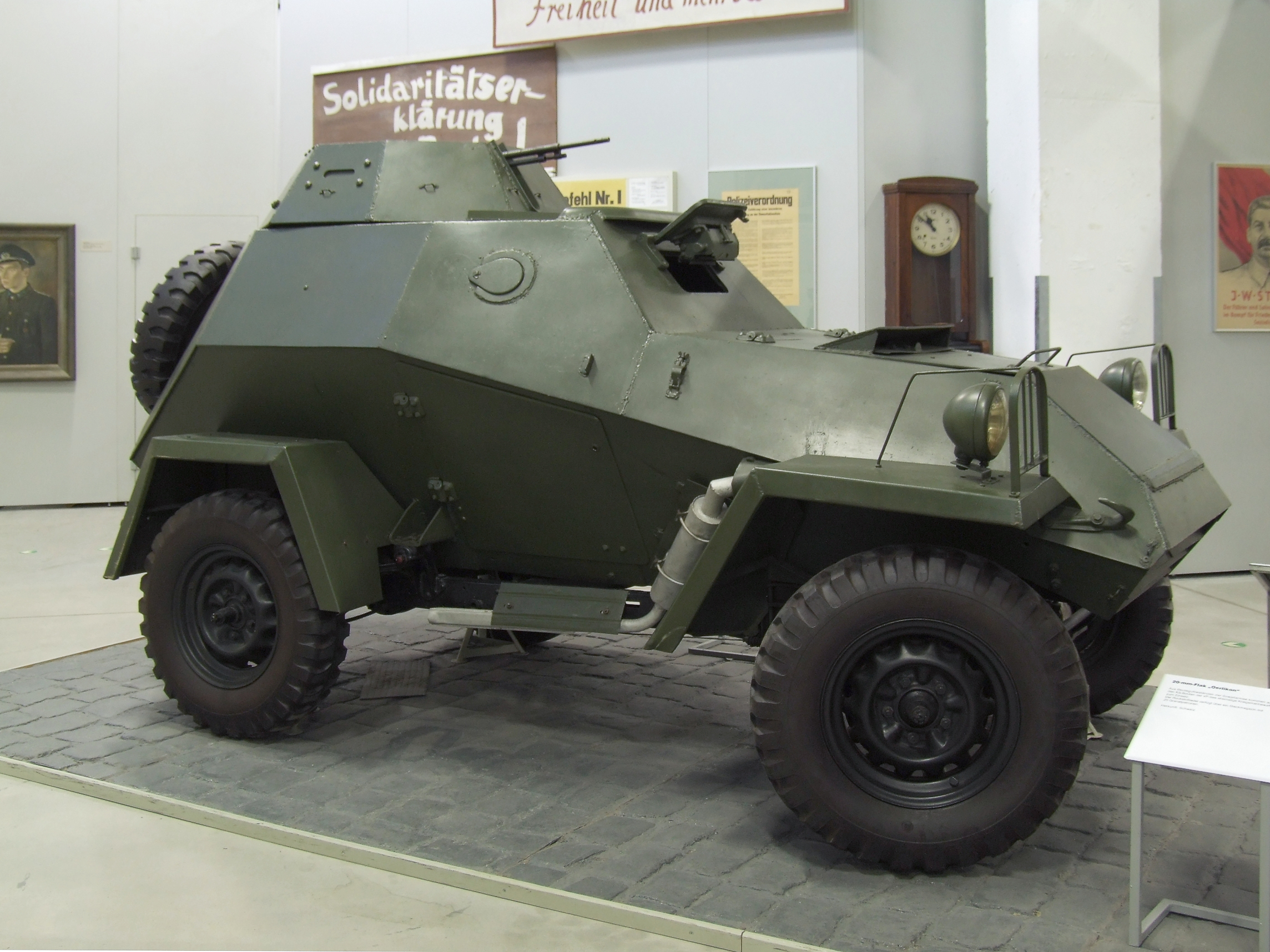
BA-64B at the Bundeswehr Military History Museum, Dresden.

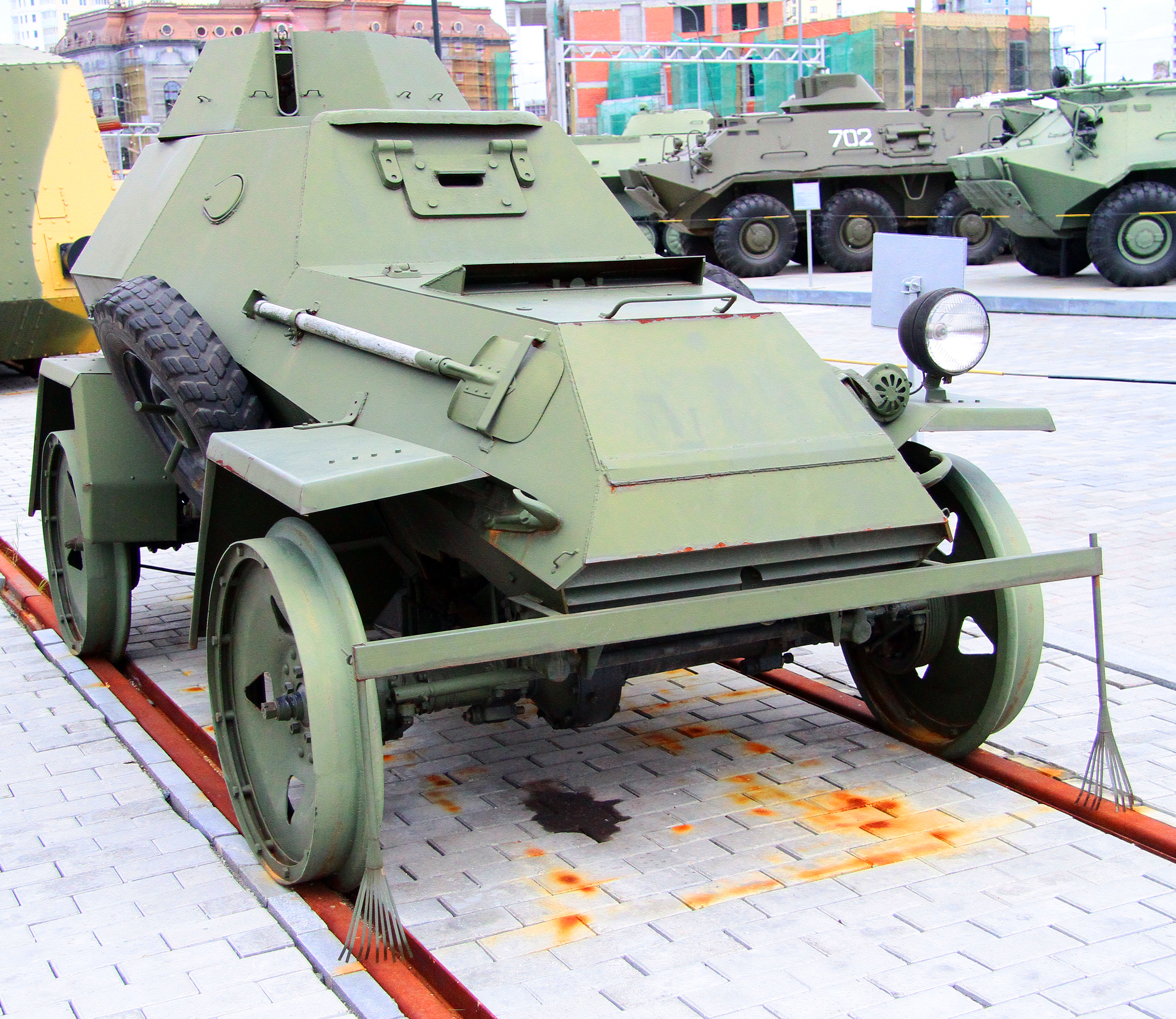
BA-64ZhD reproduction at the "Museum of military and automobile vehicles", Verkhnyaya Pyshma, Russia

- BA-64: Standard production model from 1942 to 1943, built on the chassis of a GAZ-64 jeep. Armed with a single 7.62mm Degtyaryov machine gun in an open-topped turret.
- BA-64B: Standard production model from 1943 to 1946, built on the chassis of a GAZ-67 jeep and incorporating a new carburetor, air intakes, and firing ports. Armed with a single 7.62mm Degtyaryov machine gun in an open-topped turret.
- BA-64 PTRS: Anti-tank variant of the BA-64 armed with a frame mount for a PTRS-41 anti-tank rifle in place of its turret. Field conversion, quantities unknown.
- BA-64E: Turretless armoured personnel carrier variant of the BA-64, capable of accommodating six passengers who debarked through a rear door. Nine prototypes were built in 1943 and later pressed into combat service.
- BA-64KA: Turretless armoured personnel carrier variant of the BA-64, derived from the BA-64E. This was designed as a lightweight transporter for paratroops and featured a raised hull very similar to the BA-64Sh.
- BASh-64B: Command variant of the BA-64E, which resolved the previous issues with the BA-64Sh by having sufficient room in the hull for the installation of a radio transmitter.
- BA-64D: Fire support variant of the BA-64B armed with a single 12.7mm DShK heavy machine gun. Prototype only, rejected due to space limitations.
- BA-64-126: Turretless staff car variant, did not progress beyond the concept phase. Seated a driver and two passengers. A very similar vehicle was created independently by the Red Army; this modification entailed removing not only the turret but part of the hull roofline. Fitted with windshields salvaged from captured Volkswagen Schwimmwagens.
- BA-64ZhD: Railroad patrol vehicles. Two prototypes were built, the BA-64V (Vyksinskiy) with replaceable flanged railroad wheels and BA-64G (Gorkovskiy) with auxiliary small wheels on additional axles. A very similar vehicle was created independently by the Red Army through field modifications, incorporating the flanged wheels and used for escorting armoured trains.
- BA-64Sh: Command variant of the BA-64 with a raised superstructure and increased hull roofline. It was rejected for service because it could not accommodate the radio equipment necessary for a command vehicle.
- BA-64Z: Half-track variant of the BA-64 with skis in the front and a rear track assembly for navigating deep snow. Rejected for service due to its high fuel consumption and slow speed. Also known as the BA-64SKh.
- BA-64B SG-43: Prototype of the BA-64B which replaced the Degtyaryov light machine gun with an SG-43 Goryunov medium machine gun in the same turret.
- BA-64E-37: Anti-tank and fire support variant of the BA-64E. It carried a 37mm anti-tank gun and was designed as a complement for the BA-64KA in the airborne role. Only one prototype was built.
- BA-69: BA-64 built on the chassis of a GAZ-69 jeep. Only one mock-up was created before the project was cancelled.

== Operators ==
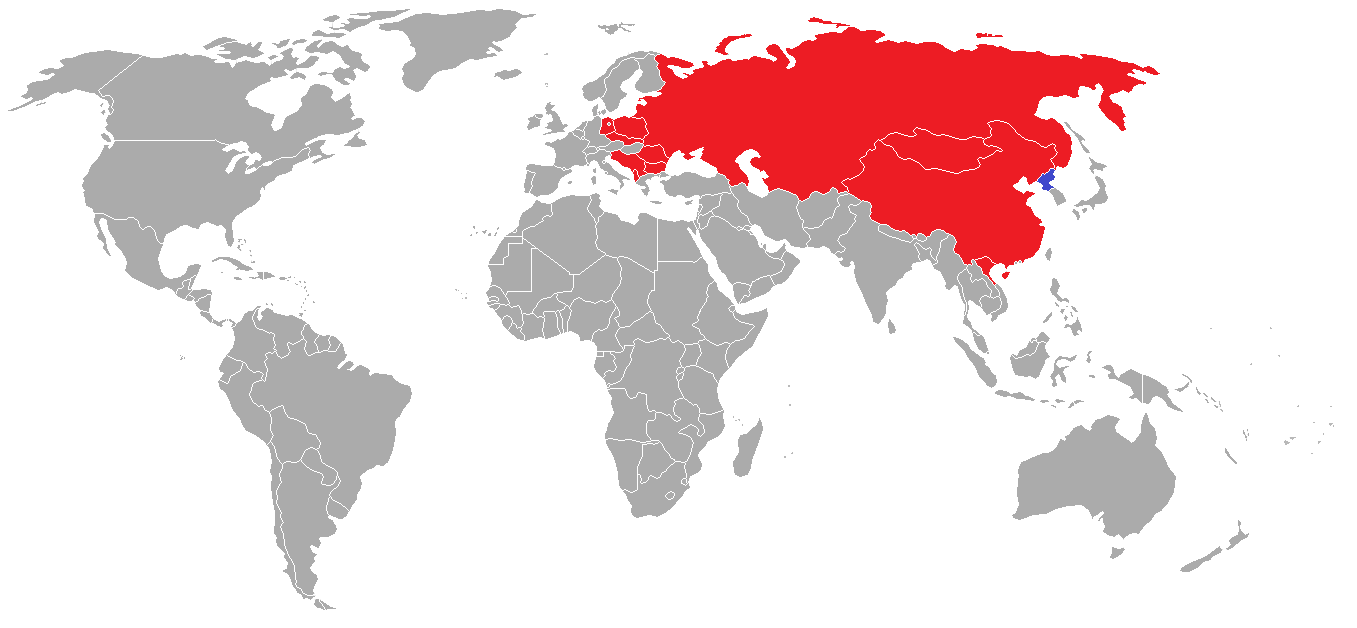
BA-64 operators

- Albania
- Bulgaria
- People's Republic of China
- Czechoslovakia
- East Germany: 115
- North Korea: 200; some in reserve storage as of 2013.
- North Vietnam
- Poland
- Romania
- Soviet Union
- Yugoslavia
