= BTR-40 =

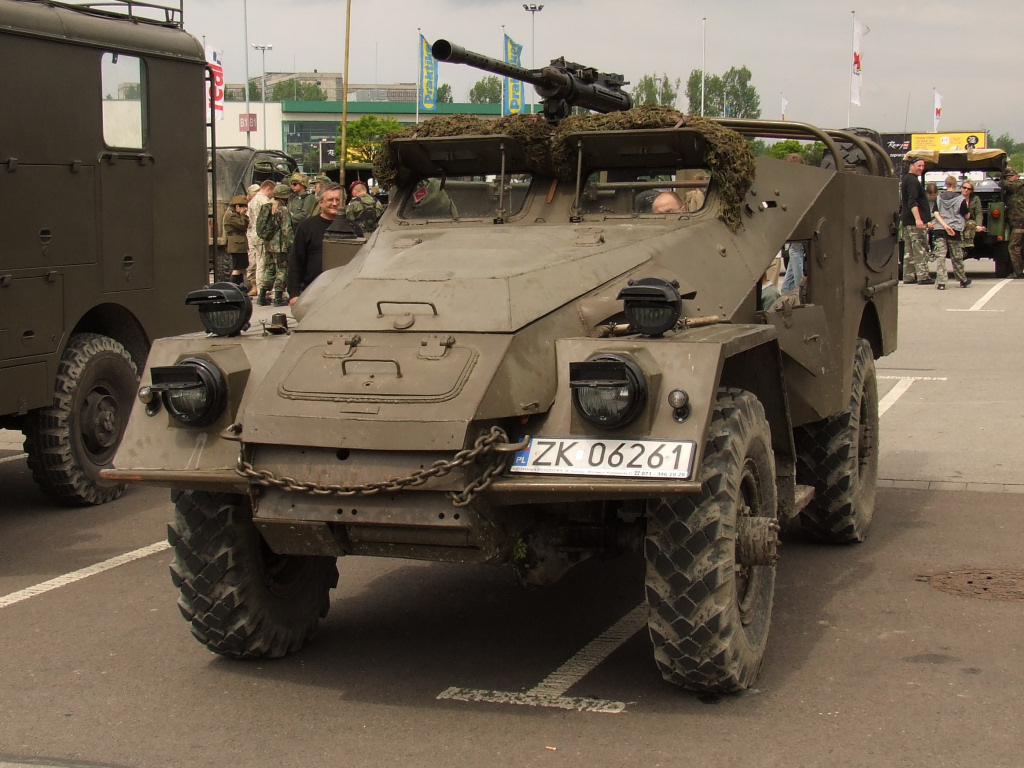
- BTR-40 at a public exhibit in Poland, 2008
- Type: Wheeled Armoured Personnel Carrier; Reconnaissance vehicle
- Place of origin: Soviet Union

Service history
- In service: 1950–1980s
- Used by: See Operators

Production history
- Designer: V. A. Dedkov
- Designed: 1947–1950
- Manufacturer: Gorkovsky Avtomobilny Zavod unknown Chinese manufacturer
- Unit cost: US$30,000 (export price to Libya, 1970-1973)
- Produced: 1950–1960 (BTR-40ZhD produced until 1969)
- No. built: 8,500
- Variants: See Variants

Specifications
- Mass: 5.3 tonnes
- Length: 5 m
- Width: 1.9 m
- Height: 2.2 m (1.83 m without armament)
- Crew: 2 + 8 passengers (BTR-40 and BTR-40V); 2 + 6 passengers (BTR-40B)
- Armor: 6-8 mm
- Main armament: 7.62 SGMB medium machine gun (1,250 rounds (total)) (optional)
- Secondary armament: 2×7.62 SGMB medium machine gun (1,250 rounds (total)) (optional)
- Engine: 6-cylinder GAZ-40; 80 hp (60 kW) at 3,400 rpm
- Power/weight: 15.1 hp/tonne (11.3 kW/tonne)
- Suspension: 4x4 wheel, leaf spring
- Ground clearance: 400 mm
- Fuel capacity: 122 l
- Operational range: 430 km (road); 385 km (cross country)
- Maximum speed: 80 km/h

The BTR-40 (БТР, from Бронетранспортёр, or Bronetransporter, literally "armoured transporter".) is a Soviet open-topped, wheeled armoured personnel carrier and reconnaissance vehicle. It is often referred to as the Sorokovka in Soviet service. It was eventually replaced in the APC role by the BTR-152 and in the scout car role by the BRDM-1.

== Development history ==
The BTR-40's development began in 1944 at the design bureau of V. A. Dedkov under the leadership of chief designer V. K. Rubstov, based on a modified GAZ-63 chassis. The concept was a successor to the BA-64B armoured car, which went out of production in 1946. The design team also included L. W. Kostikin and P.I. Muziukin. Two prototypes designated BTR-141 were completed in 1947. The first was armed with two coaxial 14.5 mm KPVT heavy machine guns on a rotatable mount that was protected by armour plate at the front and sides. The second had no fixed armament. Neither one was accepted for service. In 1950, two new prototypes were produced. Those had a different shape of armour including an upright rear armour. Again, one prototype had no fixed armament and the second was armed with two coaxial 14.5 mm KPVT heavy machine guns. These were accepted into service as BTR-40 and BTR-40A respectively.

The vehicle's drawbacks, such as its poor cross-country performance and problems with crossing water obstacles, compelled the design team to produce, in late 1954, what was planned to be an amphibious variant of the BTR-40. It received the designation BTR-40P (with the 'P' standing for plavayushchiy – "floating"). During the design process, the vehicle moved away from the APC concept and became an amphibious armoured scout car. It received a new designation, BRDM.

== Description ==
=== Overview ===
The BTR-40's design was based on the GAZ-63 four wheel drive truck, which went into production in 1946, using its chassis and most other internal mechanical components, while the six-cylinder engine was based on the design of the GAZ-12 ZIM unit. The design featured a self-bearing body, which was a new feature in Soviet vehicles. The hull has two side doors for the commander and driver and a back door. The vehicle can transport up to eight fully equipped soldiers or 1 tonne of cargo.

=== Protection ===
The BTR-40's armour is from 6 mm to 8 mm thick, which gives it protection from small arms fire and the shell splinters of its time, but does not protect it against modern artillery fragments and .50-calibre machine gun fire. The BTR-40-series tyres are not protected by armour. They are particularly vulnerable to puncture from fire of all kinds. The vehicle has no roof and is normally covered with a tarpaulin to protect the crew, transported cargo or troops from rain and snow. However, this makes it unable to mount any SGMB machine guns.

=== Armament ===
The APC variant has no permanent armament but it has pintle mounts for three 7.62 mm SGMB medium machine guns, one at the front of the troop compartment and the other two at the sides. The vehicle also has two firing ports on both sides of the hull, which allow up to four soldiers to use their weapons while being protected by the APC's armour.

=== Maneuverability ===
Like the GAZ-63 truck on which it is based on, the BTR-40 has a four-wheel drive. The chassis, however, is shorter compared to the GAZ-63. The only other thing that distinguishes the chassis of the BTR-40 from that of the GAZ-63 are additional shock absorbers. The BTR-40 also has a more powerful engine. The turning angle is 7.5 m.

=== Equipment ===
The vehicle has the 10RT-12 receiving and airing radio, which has a range of 20–25 km, and a winch at the front, with a maximum capacity of 4.5 tonnes and 70 m of cable. It has no protection against nuclear, biological and chemical (NBC) weapons. It also has no night vision equipment.

== Service history ==
=== Soviet Union ===
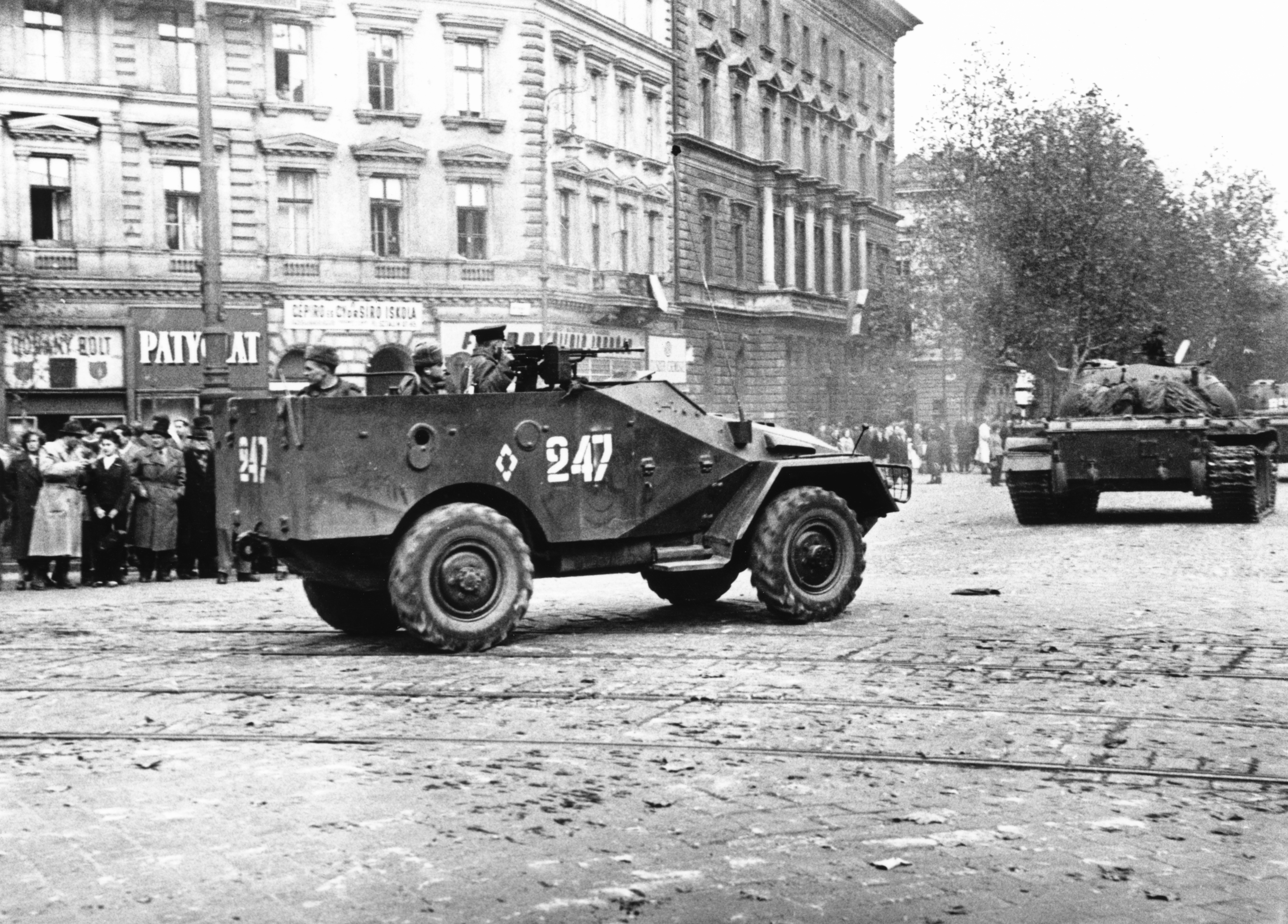
A Soviet BTR-40 in Budapest during the Hungarian Uprising of 1956

The BTR-40 was produced at the Gorkovsky Avtomobilny Zavod (Gorkovsky Automobile Factory) from 1950 to 1960. It was first shown publicly at the military parade in Moscow in 1950. It was issued to the Red Army in 1950 and was used in the APC, reconnaissance and command post roles. After several years of service, it became apparent that it did not fit the modern battlefield. It was replaced by the BTR-152.

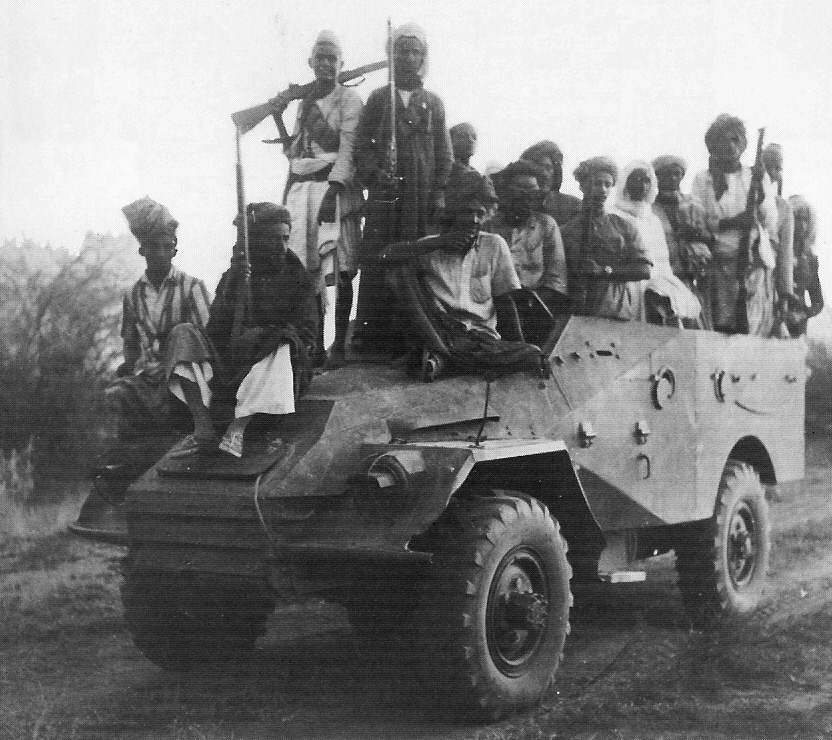
Ex-Egyptian BTR-40 captured by the royalist guerrillas during the North Yemen Civil War

=== Foreign service ===
The BTR-40 began to enter service with Soviet allies in Europe in late 1949. East Germany in particular became one of the most prolific operators of the vehicle type outside the Soviet Union, and ultimately received up to 300 as Soviet military aid. In East German service, these were designated SPW-40 and some were retained in service as specialized NBC reconnaissance vehicles as late as 1990.

The People's Republic of China (PRC) had developed a copy of the BTR-40 called the Type 55. It is unknown how many of these vehicles entered service with the PLA. The vehicle was also exported to North Korea, probably as part of a military assistance programme during the Korean War, where it saw combat for the first time. It was later used by the North Vietnamese Army during the Vietnam War.

BTR-40 also saw combat service during the North Yemen Civil War during which at least one was captured from the Egyptians by the royalist guerrillas.

=== List of conflicts ===
- 1956 – Hungarian Revolution of 1956 (Soviet Union)
- 1955–1975 – Vietnam War (Vietnam)
- 1960–1975 – Laotian Civil War (Laos)
- 1961–1962 – Operation Trikora (Indonesia)
- 1962–1970 – North Yemen Civil War (Egypt)
- 1966–1991 – South African Border War (Angola, Cuba)
- 1967 – Six-Day War (Egypt, Syria)
- 1968 – Soviet invasion of Czechoslovakia (Soviet Union)
- 1969 – Sino-Soviet border conflict (Soviet Union)
- 1970–1975 Cambodian Civil War (Cambodia)
- 1973 – Yom Kippur War (Egypt, Syria)
- 1974 – Turkish invasion of Cyprus (Republic of Cyprus National Guard)
- 1974–1991 – Ethiopian Civil War
- 1961–1991 – Eritrean War for Independence
- 1975–1990 – Lebanese Civil War
- 1975–1991 – Western Sahara War (Polisario)
- 1975–2002 – Angolan Civil War (Angola)
- 1977–1978 – Ogaden War (Somalia)
- 1978–1987 – Chadian–Libyan conflict
- 1979–1988 – Soviet–Afghan War (Soviet Union, Afghanistan)
- 1980–1988 – Iran–Iraq War (Iran)
- 1982 – 1982 Ethiopian–Somali Border War
- 2003–2005 – Insurgency in Aceh (Indonesia)

== Variants ==
=== Soviet Union ===
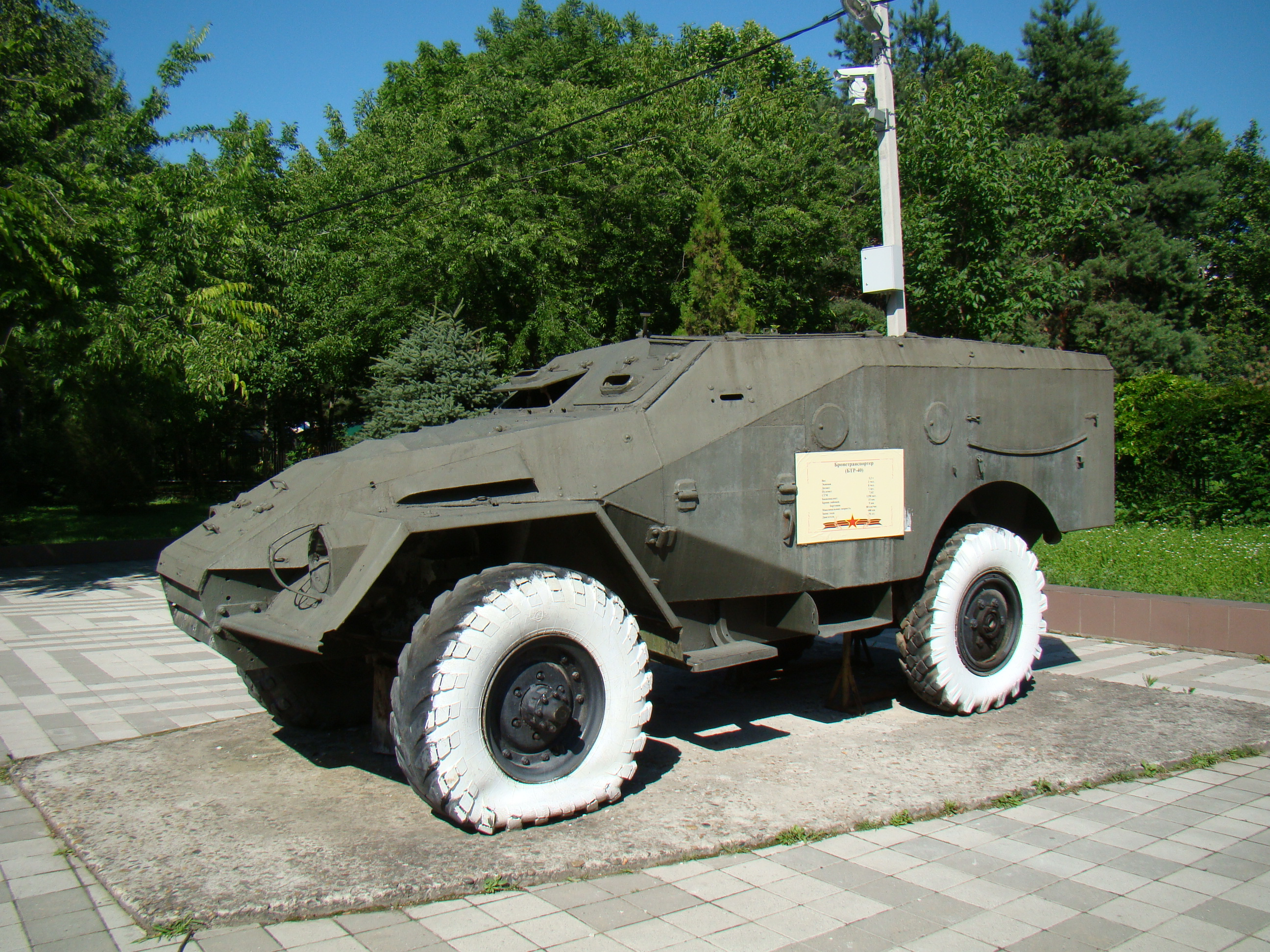
BTR-40B

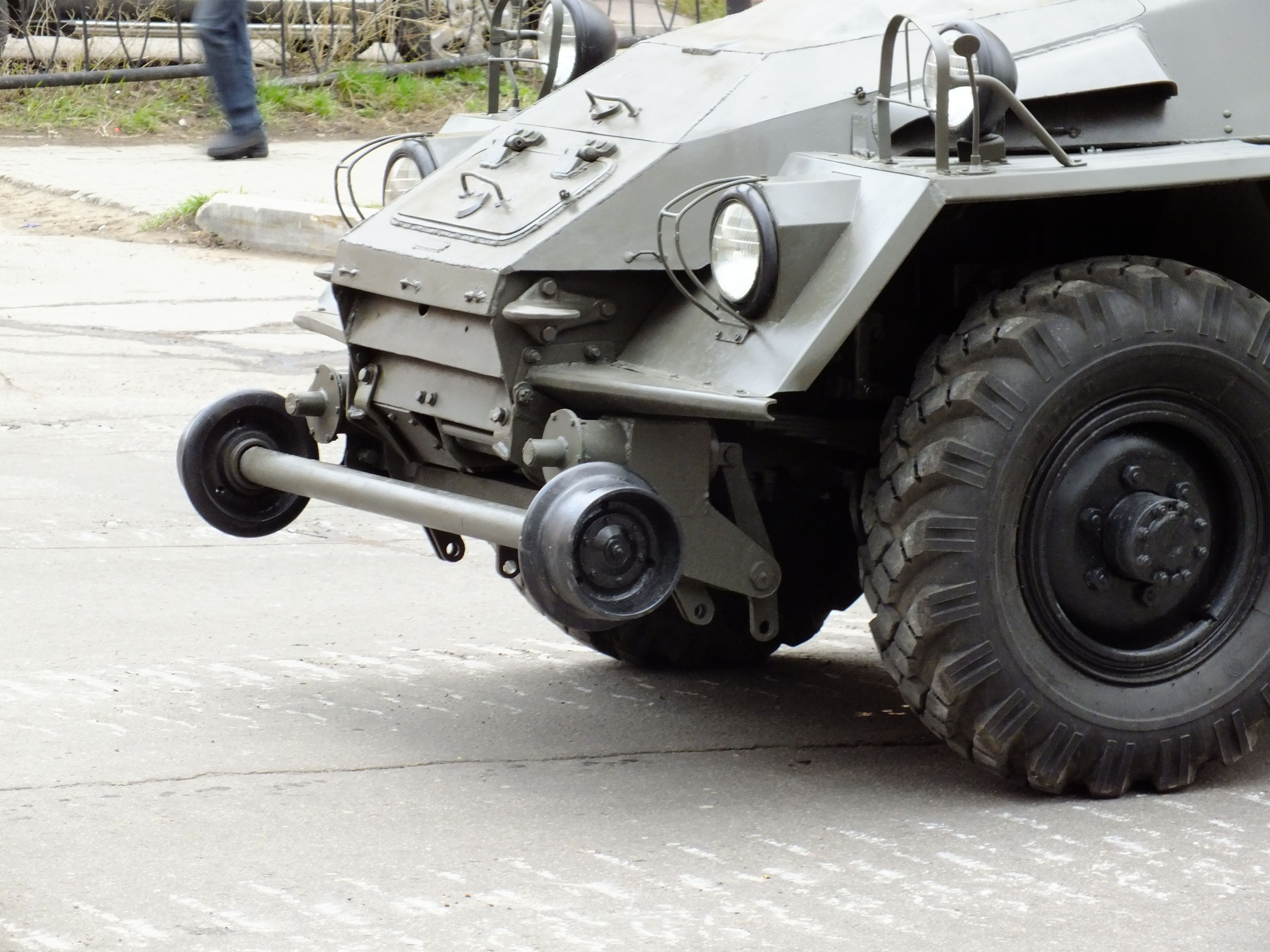
BTR-40 as road–rail vehicle.

- BTR-141 (1947) – The original prototype with a faceted rear hull had two variants. The first was armed with twin ZPTU-2 14.5 mm KPV heavy machine guns placed in a rotary platform with armour protection at the front and sides. The second version had no permanent armament but later became the BTR-40.
  - BTR-40 (1950) – Original production model.
    - BTR-40A (1950) – BTR-40 converted into a SPAAG armed with twin ZPTU-2 14.5 mm twin anti-aircraft gun (2400 rounds) in a turret, later also used in the BTR-152A, manually operated by a single soldier. The turret is placed inside the troop compartment. It can make a full turn and its guns can elevate between -5 and +80 degrees. This variant does not have the firing ports in the hull sides.
    - BTR-40V (1956) – BTR-40 fitted with an external tyre pressure regulation system.
    - BTR-40B (1957) – BTR-40V with an armoured roof with four hatches. The vehicle has a filtering/ventilation system, NBC protection system and central tyre pressure regulation system. It also has a pintle mount for a 12.7 mm or 14.5 mm heavy machine gun, although the standard version of the BTR-40B had no fixed armament. It was designed for use as a reconnaissance vehicle. Crew was reduced from 2 + 8 passengers to 2 + 6.
    - BTR-40Kh – NBC reconnaissance vehicle.
    - BTR-40ZhD (1959) – BTR-40 equipped with small rail wheels mounted to the front and rear of the vehicle on special supports.
    - BRDM-1 – Armoured car which uses a number of BTR-40 components. Originally planned to be an amphibious variant of the BTR-40 and therefore it received the designation BTR-40P.

=== People's Republic of China ===
- Type 55 – Chinese copy of the BTR-40. Possibly also a designation for the Soviet-supplied BTR-40s.

=== Cuba ===
- BTR-40A-AA – A Cuban air defence vehicle. It uses the chassis and the armoured front of the BTR-40 but the troop compartment has been removed in favour of a square sided platform mount with drop down sides and rear on which twin ZPTU-2 14.5 mm KPV heavy machine guns are placed.
- BTR-40A-PB – A Cuban BTR-40 armed with an anti-tank guided missile (ATGM) launcher. While travelling, the launcher is hidden in the superstructure so that from a distance, the vehicle cannot be easily distinguished from a normal BTR-40. The superstructure also provides the launcher with armour protection. When in position, the roof of the superstructure is opened sideways and the launcher is elevated.
- Jababli – Is a Cuban BTR-40 fitted with a 3M11 Falanga (AT-2 Swatter) ATGM launcher on a launch platform in a cut-down superstructure. Only a limited number were built. NATO gave it the designation M1975/4.

=== East Germany ===
- SPW-40 – The East German designation for a BTR-40.
  - SPW-40A – The East German designation for a BTR-40A.
  - SPW-40Ch – The East German designation for a BTR-40Kh. After the reunification of Germany, these were removed from East German reserve storage and sold to Egypt.
  - SPW-40 converted into a tank destroyer armed with an elevatable ATGM launcher capable of firing six 9M14 Malyutka ATGMs with an armoured roof over it in a cut down troop compartment. This variant does not have the firing ports in the hull sides.

=== Indonesia ===
- BTR-40 converted into an armoured car armed with a medium machine gun in a cube-shaped turret on top of the superstructure inside the troop compartment. It also has four smoke grenade launchers on both sides of the hull.
- BTR-40 converted into an armoured car armed with a 40 mm gun in an angular turret on top of the superstructure inside the troop compartment, it also has four smoke grenade dischargers on both sides of the hull. It has a searchlight on the left hand side of the hull. It is intended to be used for fire support.

=== Israel ===
- BTR-40 fitted with pintle mounts for the US M1919A4 7.62mm light machine guns, one in the forward part of the troop compartment and two on either side as well a large number of equipment holders on the hull.
- BTR-40 fitted with TCM-20 anti-aircraft turret.

== Operators ==
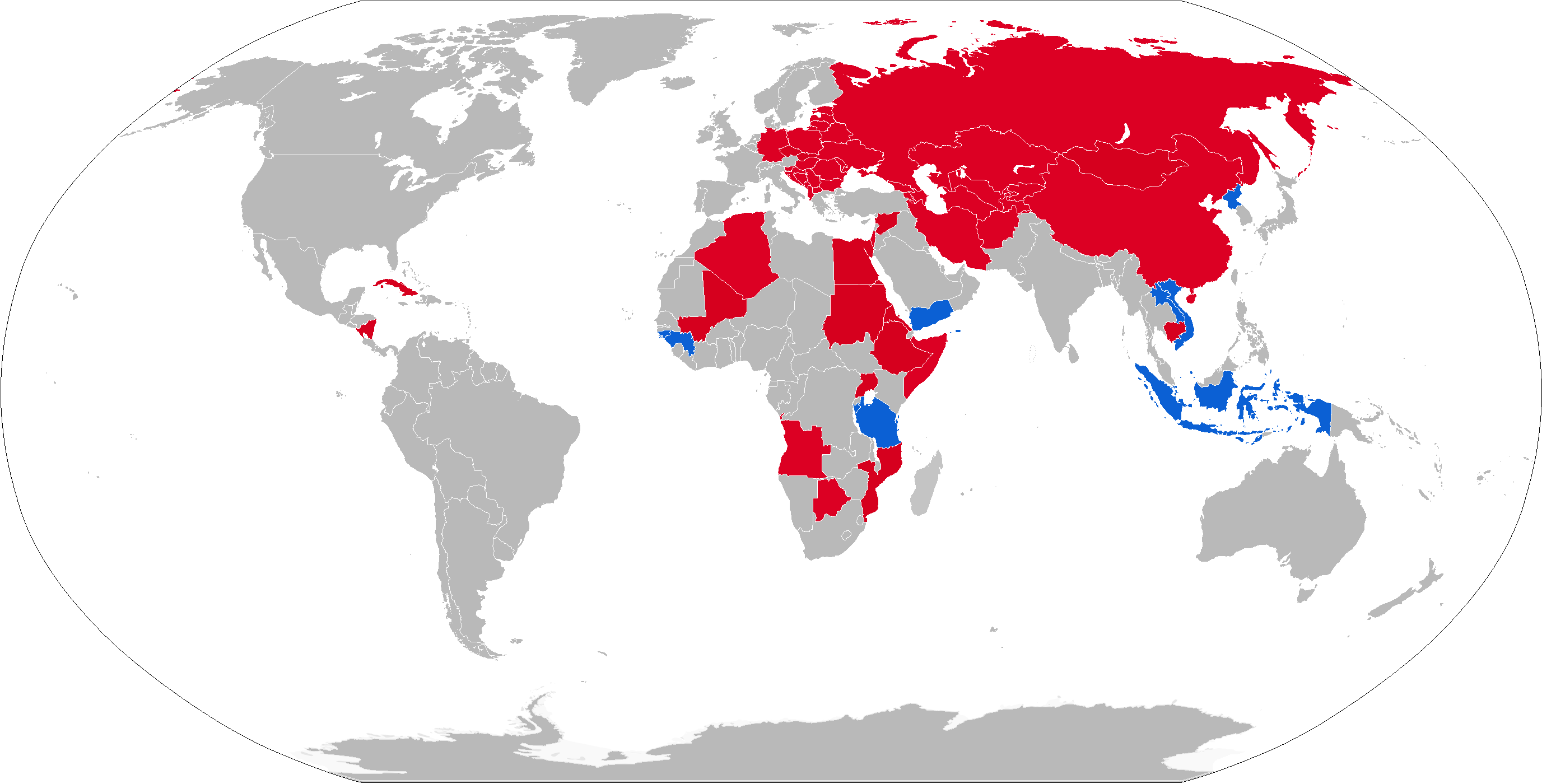
Operators Current Former

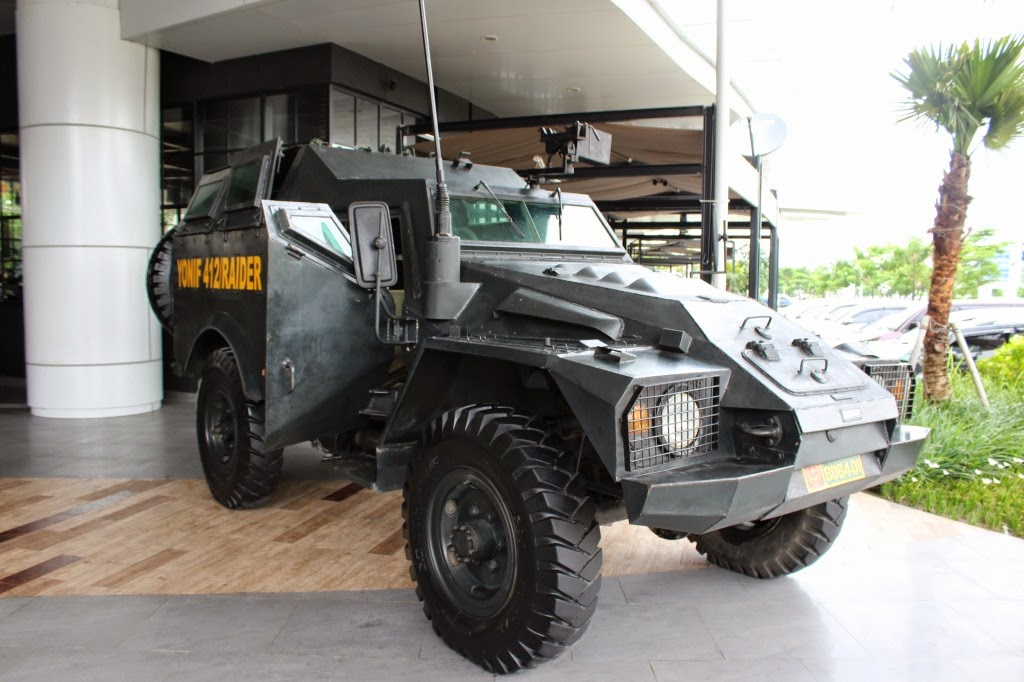
Modernized BTR-40 of the Indonesian security forces.

=== Current operators ===
- Burundi: 20
- Guinea: 16
- Guinea-Bissau: 15
- Indonesia: 100; 85 operational.
- Laos: 10
- North Korea: 450
- Tanzania: Type 55 variant.
- Vietnam: 100
- Yemen

=== Former operators ===
- Angola: 32
- Afghanistan: 100
- Albania
- Algeria: 100
- Botswana: 3
- People's Republic of Bulgaria: 150
- Cambodia
- People's Republic of China: Unlicensed variant designed Type 55; retired in the 1990s.
- People's Republic of the Congo: 20; Type 55 variant.
- Cuba
- East Germany: 300
- Egypt
- Estonia: Used by Estonian Defence League.
- Hungarian People's Republic: 200
- Iran
- Israel: Used by the Israel Border Police.
- Laos
- Mongolian People's Republic: 200
- Mozambique
- Polish People's Republic: 400
- Somalia: 60
- Soviet Union
- Uganda: 60
- North Yemen: 70
- South Yemen: 60
- Yugoslavia: 40

== See also ==
- BRDM-1
- BTR-152
