= GAZ-64 =

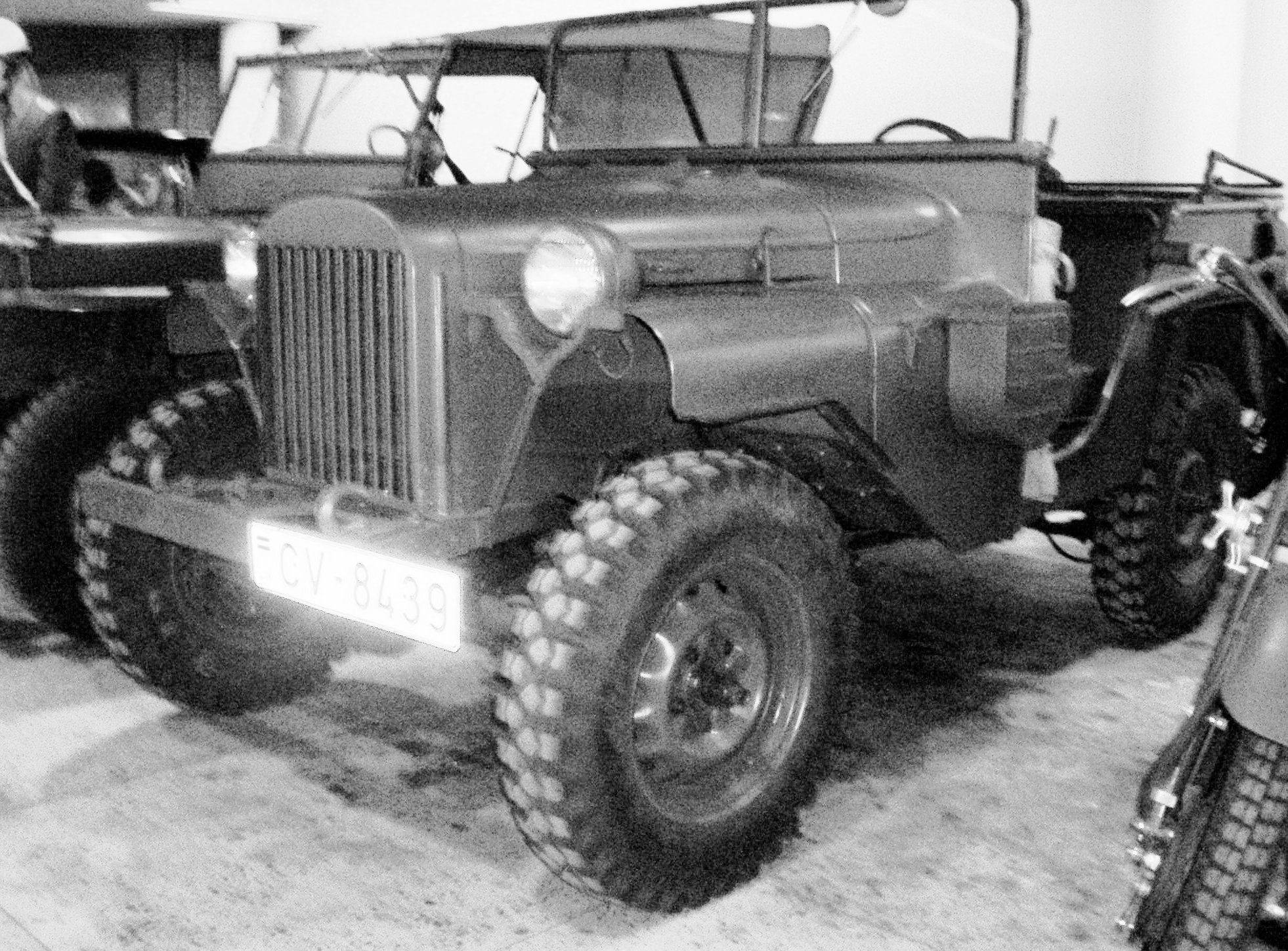
- A 1941 GAZ-64

Overview
- Manufacturer: GAZ
- Production: 1941–1942; 646 produced
- Assembly: Soviet Union: Gorky, Ulyanovsk

Body and chassis
- Body style: jeep
- Layout: F4 layout
- Related: BA-64

Powertrain
- Engine: 3.3L GAZ M1 I4

Chronology
- Predecessor: GAZ-61
- Successor: GAZ-67; GAZ-67B

The GAZ-64 was a 4x4 vehicle made by GAZ (Gorkovsky Avtomobilny Zavod, translated as Gorky Automobile Plant, which originally was a cooperation between Ford and the Soviet Union), succeeding the earlier GAZ-61. Its design was led by Vitaliy Grachev. The design process was exceptionally quick, taking only a few weeks.

== Design ==
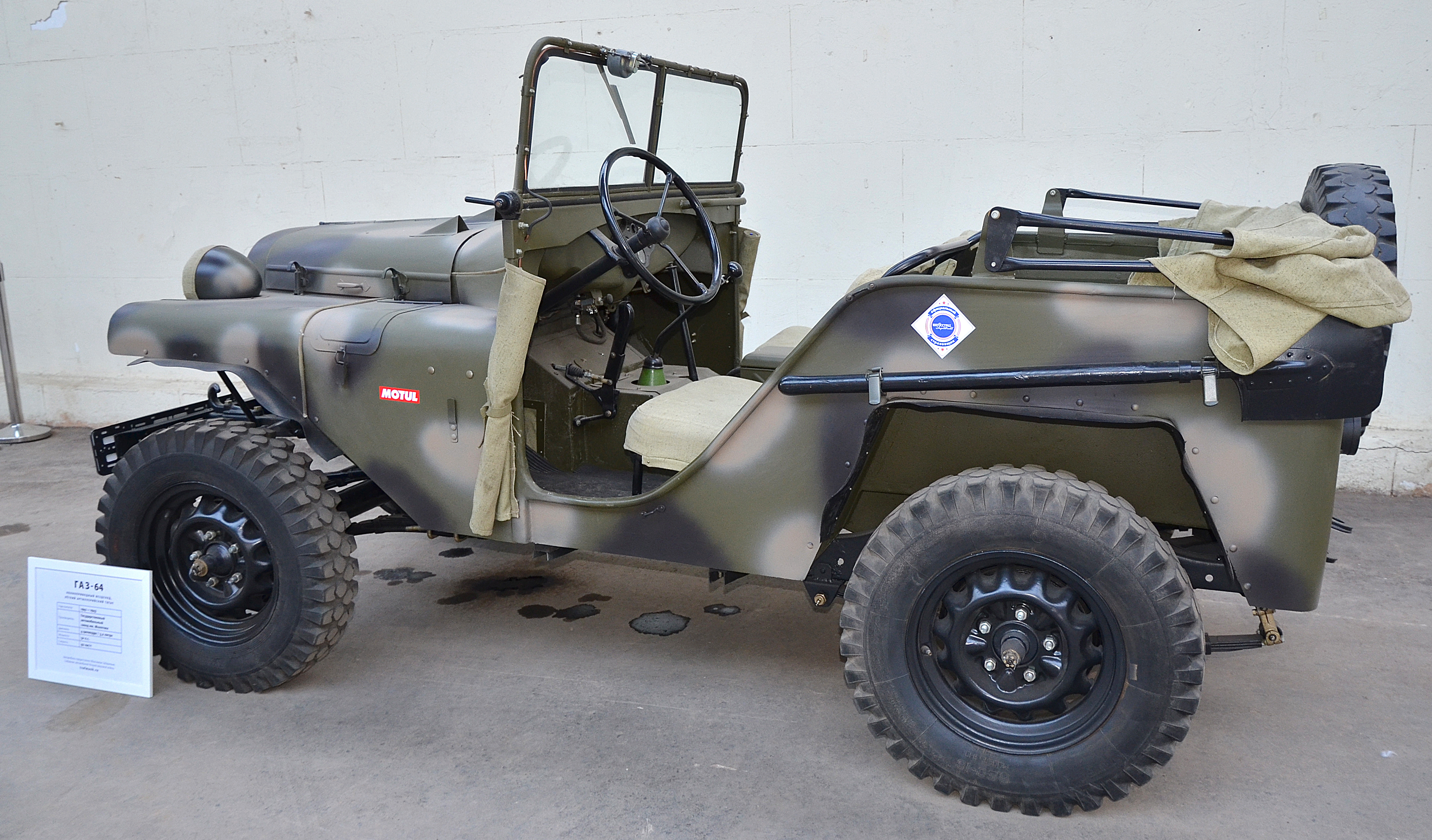
Left side / rear of GAZ-64

The curb weight of the car was 1,200 kg (2,646 lb). It was powered by a 3285 cc, inline-4 engine giving 50 hp (37 kW) and a top speed of 100 km/h (62 mph). It was produced using existing commercially available parts. As such, it was based on a shortened GAZ-61 chassis, while the engine came from the GAZ-MM truck.

== Development ==
The GAZ-64 was developed from a requirement developed during the 1939-1940 war between the Soviet Union and Finland. Although it appears outwardly similar to the American Bantam / Willys jeep, it was developed using parts already commercially available in the Soviet Union, and built in a plant that was originally set up with Ford.

It was designed to replace the earlier GAZ-61, which was totally reconstructed in a very short period (3 February – 25 March 1941) under the leadership of Vitaly Grachev to create a 4×4 jeep, which was named the GAZ-64. During WWII, it was succeeded by the more successful GAZ-67 and GAZ-67B. The GAZ-64 and GAZ-67 formed the basis for the BA-64 armoured cars.

=== Production ===
646 GAZ-64s were made between March 1941 and summer 1942 by the GAZ or Gorkovsky Avtomobilny Zavod company. The name translates as the Gorky automobile plant, and the factory was originally a cooperation between the company Ford and the Soviet Union.

Due to the availability of American made jeeps provided by the American Lend-Lease program, the majority of wartime production of the GAZ-64 was dedicated to the BA-64 armored cars. Due to GAZ-64 (and GAZ-67(B) from 1943/1944) production being tied to BA-64 production, only around 2,500 regular units were produced during the war. Post-war production increased greatly, and more than 90,000 GAZ-67Bs were produced by the time production ended in 1953.
