= GAZ-61 =

Four-wheel drive car

GAZ-61V / GAZ-61B (ГАЗ-61B / ГАЗ-61Б)
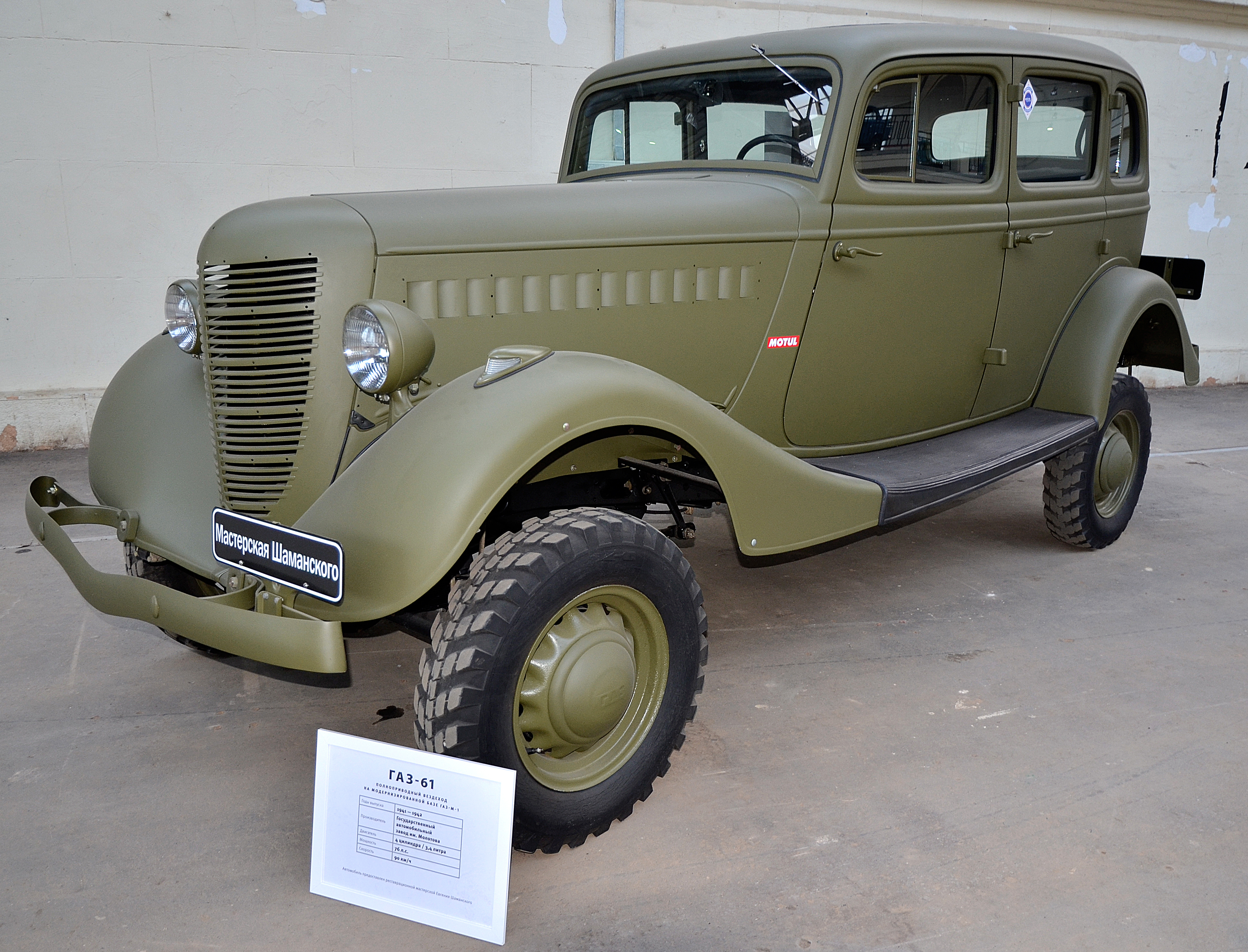

Overview
- Manufacturer: GAZ
- Production: 1938–1945; 238 made
- Assembly: Soviet Union: Gorky, Ulyanovsk

Body and chassis
- Class: Full-size car
- Body style: Five-seat, four-door phaeton
- Layout: F4 layout

Powertrain
- Engine: 3.4L GAZ-11 I6
- Transmission: 4-speed manual

Dimensions
- Wheelbase: 2,845 mm (112.0 in)
- Length: 4,670 mm (183.9 in)
- Width: 1,750 mm (68.9 in)
- Height: 1,905 mm (75.0 in)
- Curb weight: 1,650 kg (3,638 lb)

Chronology
- Predecessor: GAZ-M21
- Successor: GAZ-64

The GAZ-61 is a four-wheel-drive car from USSR manufacturer GAZ first introduced in 1938 by designer V. A. Gratchev, to replace his too-complex model GAZ-M21.

== History ==
It was essentially a GAZ-M1 with a higher stance and all-wheel drive (one of the world's first all-wheel drive passenger cars). It could climb angles up to 38 degrees and cross water up to 72 cm (28 in) deep.

The first version, produced from 1940 until 1941, was a five-seat four-door phaeton. It was powered by a 3,485 cc (212.7 cu in) six-cylinder four-stroke engine with 85 hp (63 kW) and a top speed of 100 km/h (62 mph). Many supreme commanders of the Red Army headquarters used this car in 1941.

In 1941, the updated GAZ-61-73 was introduced. It became a five-seat, four-door six-light saloon with the same engine, but now rated at a top speed of 107 km/h (66 mph).

The GAZ-61 was produced not only in civilian black but also in blue and Russian 4BO green, together with the typical cross-country tread tires.
