= Monte Vesta =

Mountain in Italy

Coordinates: 45°48′14″N 10°37′43″E

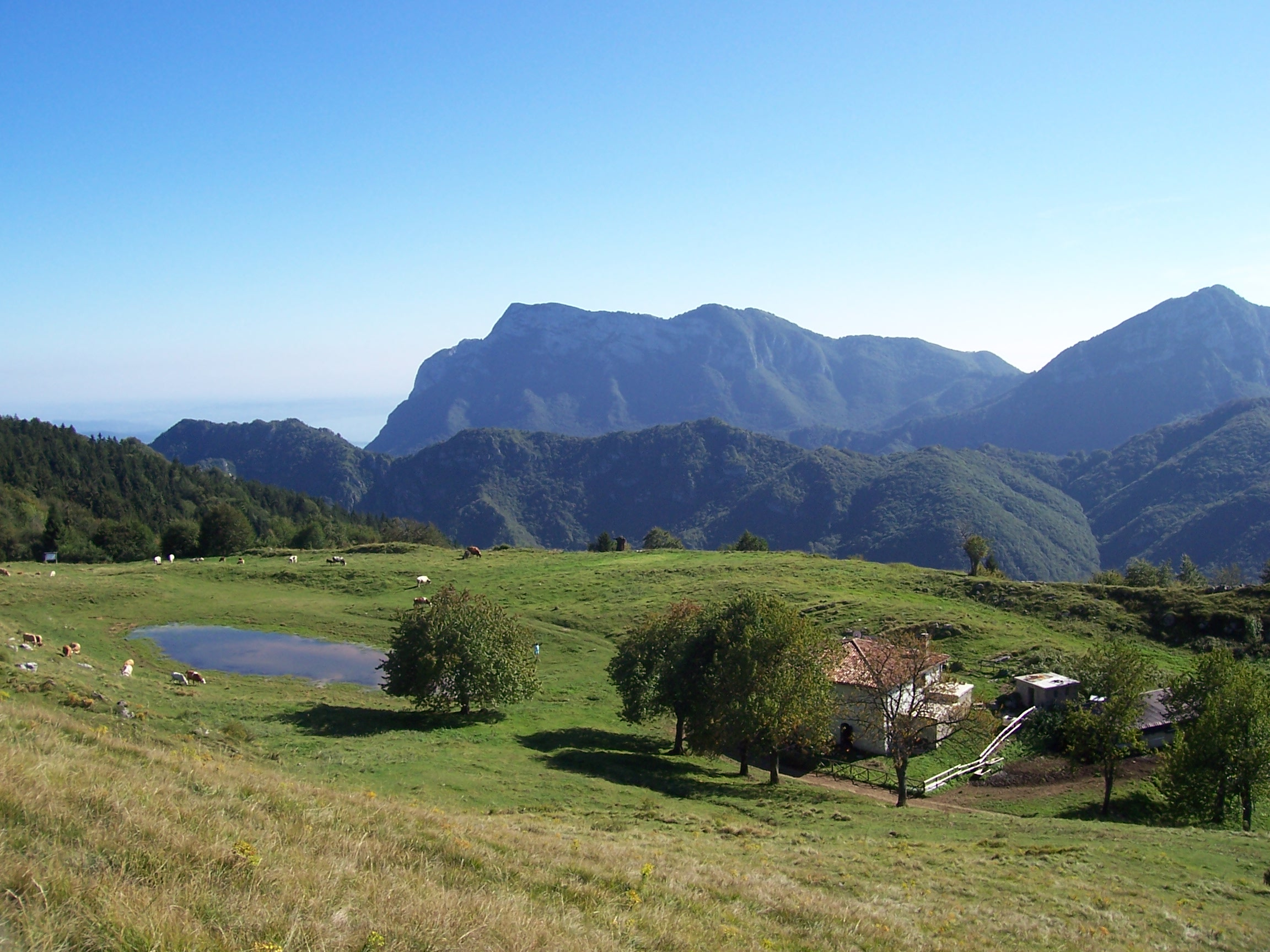

Highest point
- Elevation: 1,400 m (4,600 ft)

Geography
- Location: Lombardy, Italy
- Parent range: Brescia and Garda Prealps

Monte Vesta is a mountain of Lombardy, Italy. It administratively belongs to the province of Brescia.

== SOIUSA classification ==
According to the SOIUSA (International Standardized Mountain Subdivision of the Alps) the mountain can be classified in the following way:

- main part = Eastern Alps
- major sector = Southern Limestone Alps
- section = Brescia and Garda Prealps
- subsection = Prealpi Gardesane
- supergroup = Prealpi Gardesane Sud-occidentali
- group = Gruppo Tombea-Manos
- subgroup = Gruppo della Cima Tombea
- code = II/C-30.II-B.5.a
