= Vestal =

Vestal may refer to:

== People ==
- Albert Henry Vestal (1875–1932), American lawyer and politician
- David Vestal (1924–2013), American photographer, critic, and teacher
- Ina Vestal (1903–1983), American politician
- Janet Vestal Kelly (born 1976), née Vestal, American civil servant, former Virginia Secretary of Health and Human Resources and former Secretary of the Commonwealth of Virginia
- Samuel Vestal (1844–1928), American politician
- Scott Vestal (born 1962), American banjoist, songwriter, and luthier
- Shawn Vestal, American author and former newspaper columnist
- Stanley Vestal (1887–1957), American writer, poet, biographer, and historian
- Vestal Goodman (1929–2003), American gospel singer
- Vestal McIntyre, American 21st century author

== Ships ==
- HMS Vestal, eight Royal Navy ships
- USS Vestal, a US Navy repair ship
- HCS Vestal (1809), an East India Company Bombay Marine ship

== Insects ==
- Vestal moth
  - Rhodometra sacraria, a moth of Europe, Africa and Asia of the family Geometridae
  - Antaeotricha albulella, a moth of the United States of the family Depressariidae
  - Cabera variolaria, a moth of North America of the family Geometridae
- Spilosoma vestalis or Vestal tiger-moth

== Other uses ==
- Pertaining to Vesta (goddess), a Roman goddess
  - Vestal Virgin, a priestess of Vesta
- Vestal, New York, United States, a town
  - Vestal High School
- Vestal Peak, Needle Mountains, Colorado, United States
- Vestal Parkway, a portion of New York State Route 434
- The Vestal, a ballet by Marius Petipa and Mikhail Ivanov
- "The Vestal" (Plebs), a 2016 television episode
- Vestal Watches, a fashion watch brand

== See also ==
- Vestale (disambiguation)
- Vesta (disambiguation)
