= GAZ-69 =

Soviet four-wheel drive light truck

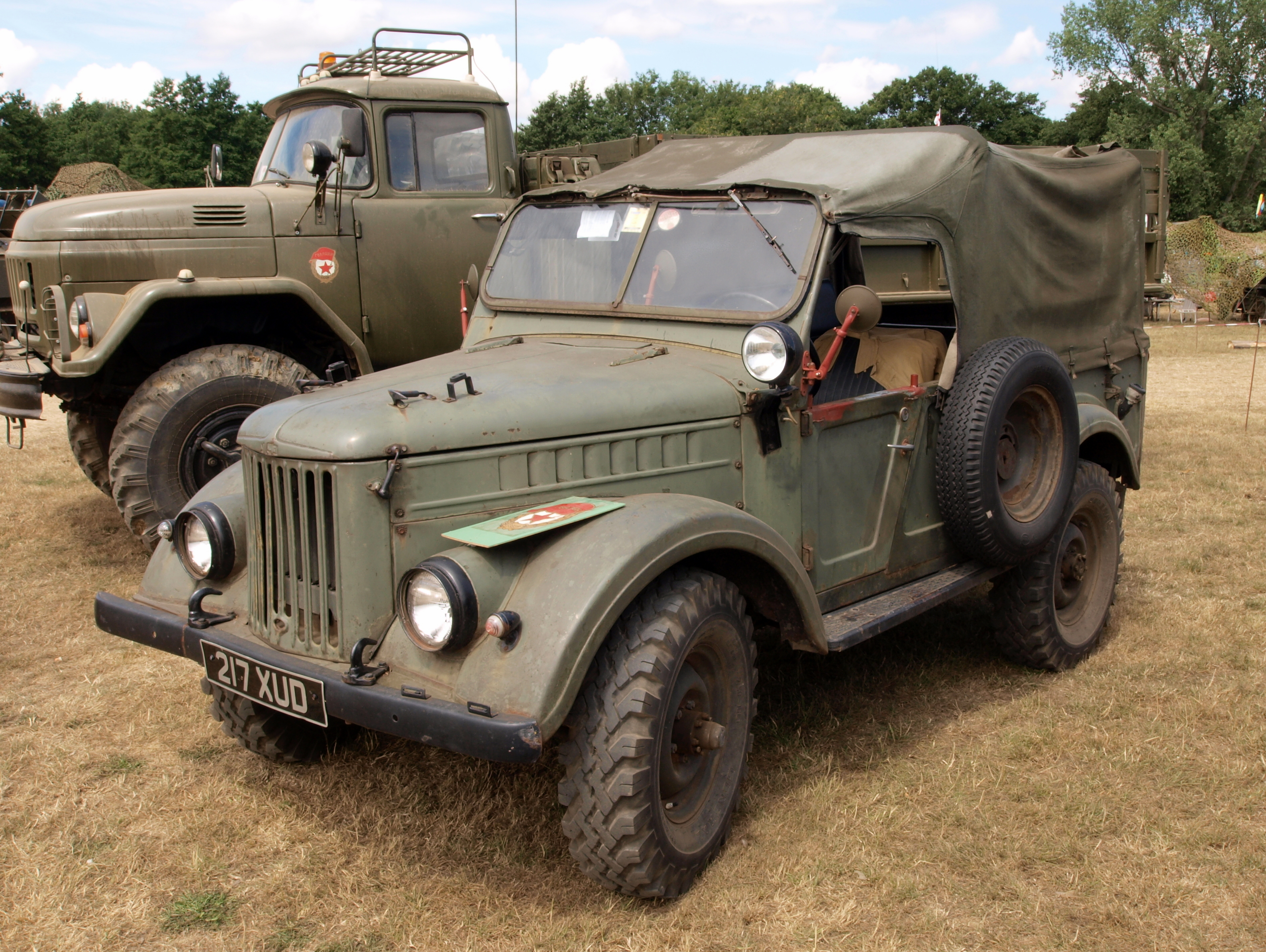

Overview
- Manufacturer: GAZ (1953–1956); UAZ (1956–1972)
- Also called: Kaengsaeng 68 (North Korea); Sungri 4.10/25 (North Korea); UAZ-69
- Production: 1953–1972 (1975 for Romania)
- Assembly: Soviet Union: Gorky, Ulyanovsk; Romania: Câmpulung (spare parts only)

Body and chassis
- Class: Light truck
- Body style: 2-door cargo, 4-door field car
- Layout: Front-engine, four-wheel-drive
- Related: IMS-57, M59, ARO M461; UAZ-452

Powertrain
- Engine: 2.1 L GAZ-69 I4
- Transmission: 3-speed manual

Dimensions
- Wheelbase: 2,300 mm (91 in)
- Length: 3,850 mm (152 in)
- Width: 1,750 mm (69 in)
- Height: 1,950 mm (77 in)
- Curb weight: 1,535–1,589 kg (3,384–3,503 lb)

Chronology
- Predecessor: GAZ-67; Willys MB
- Successor: UAZ-469

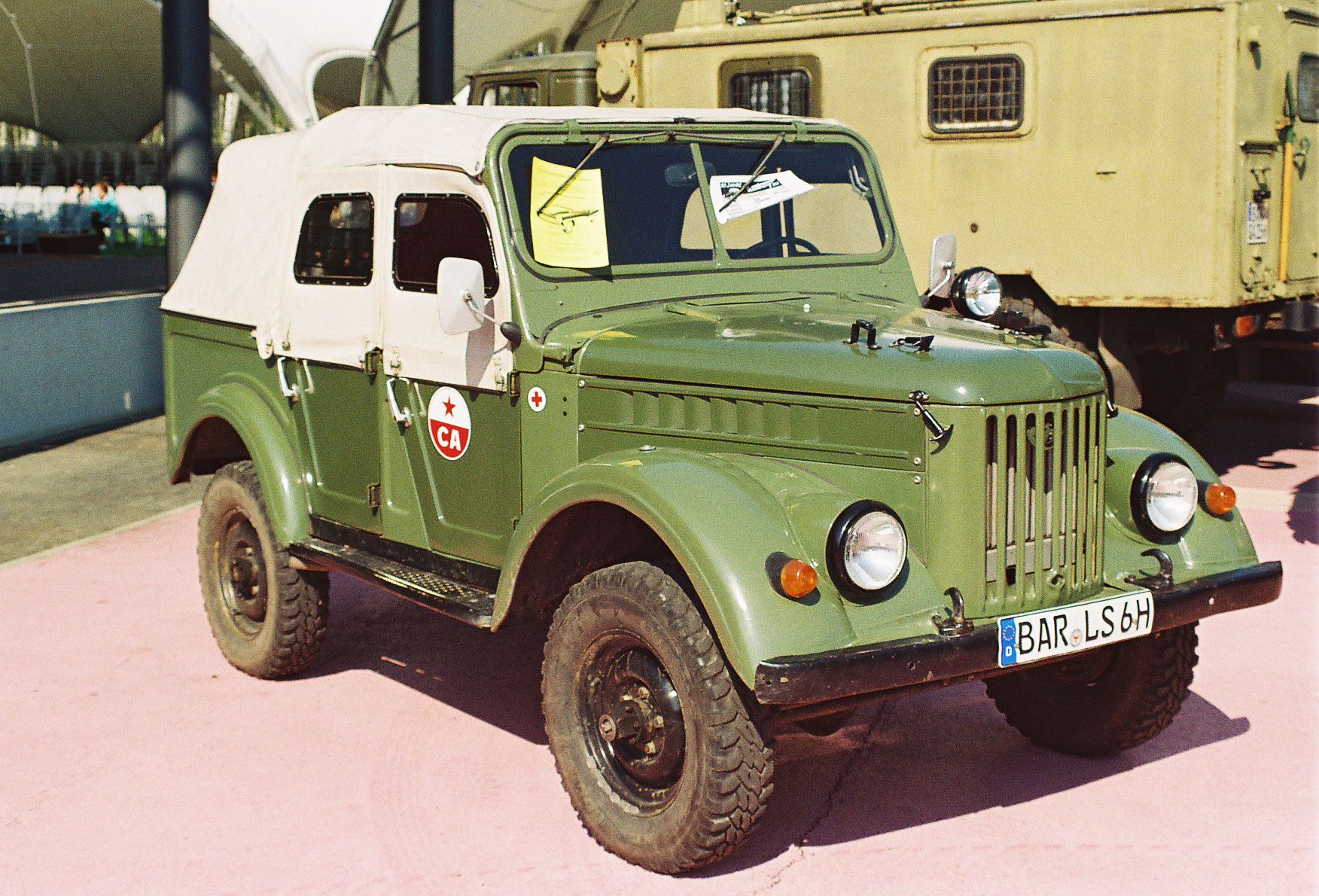
GAZ-69A

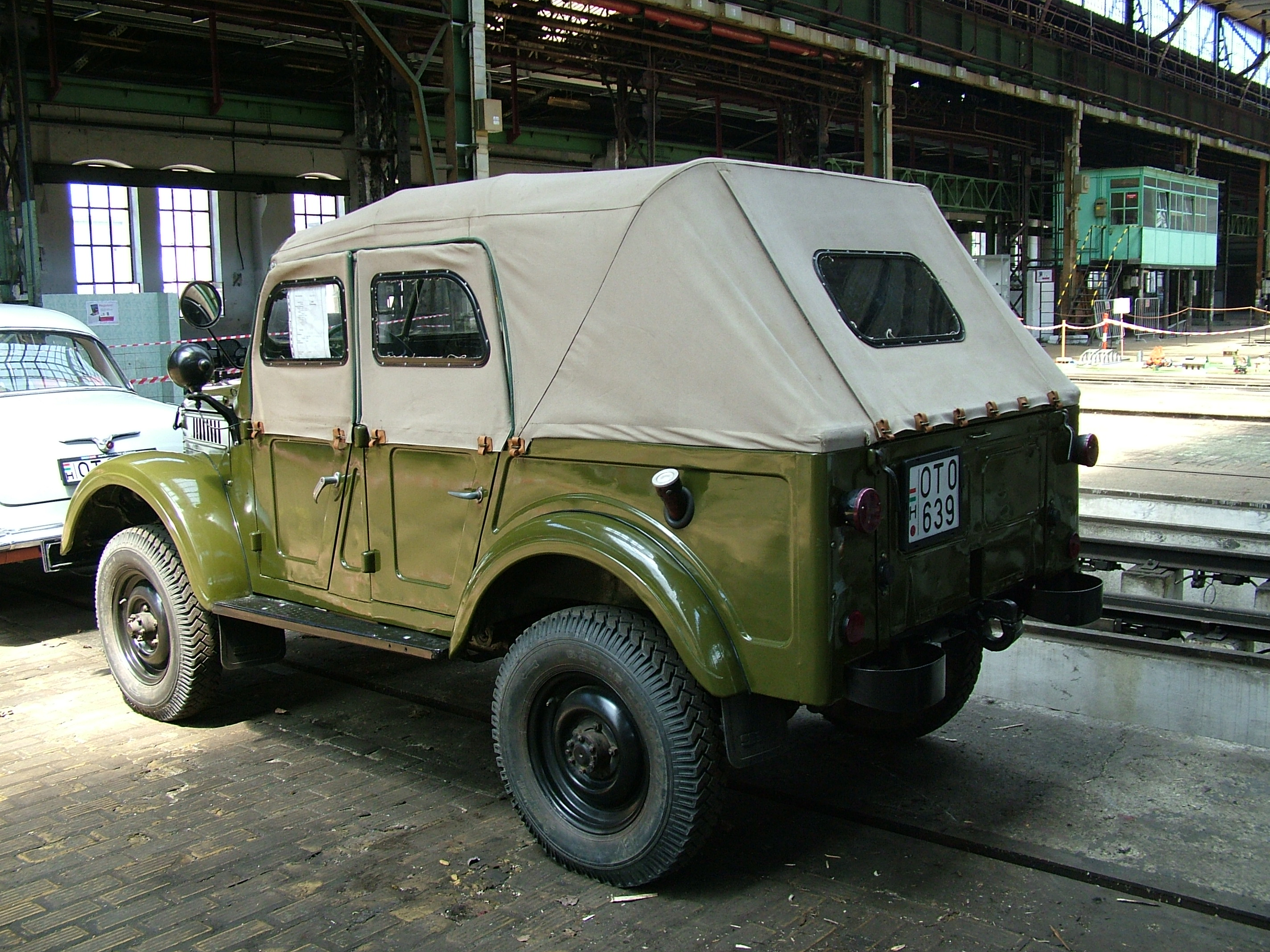
GAZ-69A rear

The GAZ-69 is a Soviet four-wheel drive off-road vehicle produced by GAZ (ГАЗ, or Gorkovsky Avtomobilny Zavod, Gorky Automobile Factory) between 1953 and 1956 and then by UAZ between 1956 and 1972, though all of these light truck class vehicles were known as GAZ-69s. It was also produced in Romania until 1975.

== Development and production ==
The GAZ-69 was created by the team of chief designer Grigoriy Vasserman as a replacement for the GAZ-67B that would have lower fuel consumption than its predecessor and use the same 55 hp (41 kW; 56 PS) 2.1 L (130 cu in) inline four and three-speed transmission as the GAZ-M20 Pobeda. The axles and some other parts were taken from the GAZ-67B. The development process started in 1946 and the first prototypes known under the name "Truzhenik" (Toiler) were built in 1947. After extensive on-road testing, the new off-road vehicle went into production on August 25, 1953. Over 600,000 GAZ-69s had been built by the end of production in the USSR in 1972. A copy of the GAZ-69 with some modifications was produced by ARO in Romania until 1975, first as the IMS-57, then heavily redesigned as the IMS M59, and later modernized as the ARO M461. GAZ-69s were standard military jeeps of the Eastern Bloc and client states, except Romania that mainly used the locally built ARO models.

=== Design ===
The standard GAZ-69 was able to reach 56 mph (90 km/h), but more powerful versions, with 2,400 cc (derived from the basic 2,100 cc) 65 h.p. engines and the same three-speed gearbox, could reach 100 km/h (62 mph). They were known as the GAZ-69M, or GAZ-69AM for the four-door version.

It featured two fuel tanks, one of 47 litres (12 US gal; 10 imp gal) under the floor, one of 28 litres (7 US gal; 6 imp gal) beneath the passenger's seat. All civilian models also had to meet Army requirements, in case of wartime requisitioning. (This is also why a hardtop version was not available until 1993) The basic variant GAZ-69 has a pair of doors and usually has standard canvas top and upper sides; there are two seats in front and two folding benches for three passengers each on sides. The further variant GAZ-69A (UAZ-69A) has four doors, folding canvas top and two rows of seats.

It was used as the basis for the rear-wheel drive van GAZ-19 that was built in 1955 but did not pass the prototype stage. The off-road van and light truck UAZ-450 and the newer UAZ-469 also traced their origins to the GAZ-69.

== Military use ==
The GAZ-69 had been the basic light off-road vehicle of the Soviet Army, replacing GAZ-67s and Willys Jeeps, before the army adopted the UAZ-469. It was also used as the basis for the 2P26 tank destroyer, as well as for the GAZ-46 MAV, a light 4x4 amphibious vehicle inspired by the Ford GPA 'Seep'.

== Users ==
- Afghanistan
- Albania
- Armenia
- Cambodia
- China
- Cuba
- Colombia
- Czechoslovakia
- East Germany
- Egypt
- Finland
- Hungary
- India
- Indonesia − around 4400 units ordered in total; first batch 4000 units ordered by government, second batch 400 units ordered by Indonesian Air Force
- Iraq
- Iran
- Israel − Captured vehicles
- Laos
- Lebanon
- Mali
- Nepal
- North Korea − built locally as the Kaengsaeng
- Poland
- Romania − built locally
- Russia
- Soviet Union
- Syria
- Vietnam

== In popular culture ==
In the film Indiana Jones and the Kingdom of the Crystal Skull a GAZ-69 appears in one of the chases of the film involving Spalko and the main characters. It is also seen briefly in the 1977 film In The Zone of Special Attention

== Gallery ==
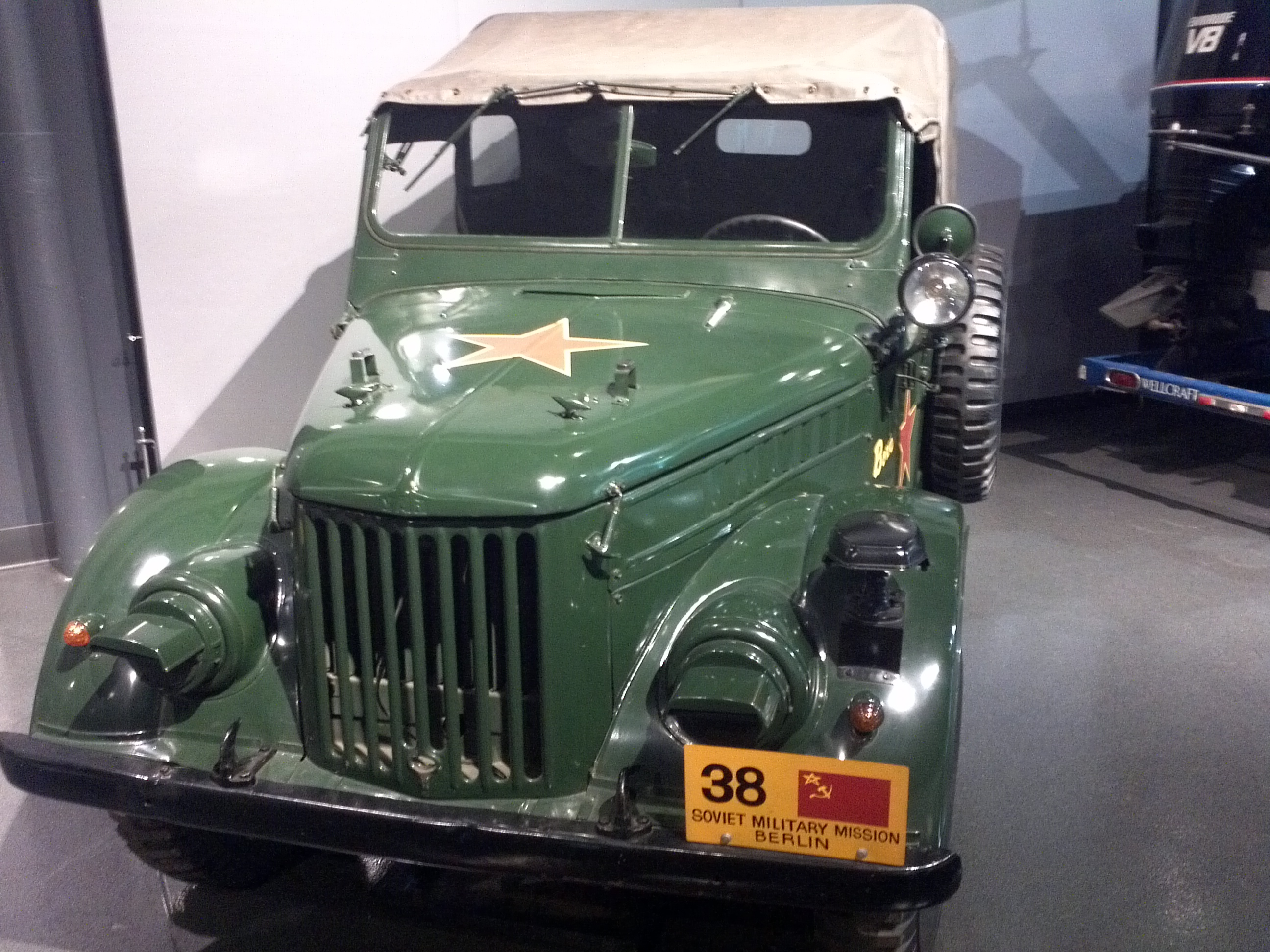
A retired GAZ-69 in the National Museum of Transportation in St. Louis, Mo, United States

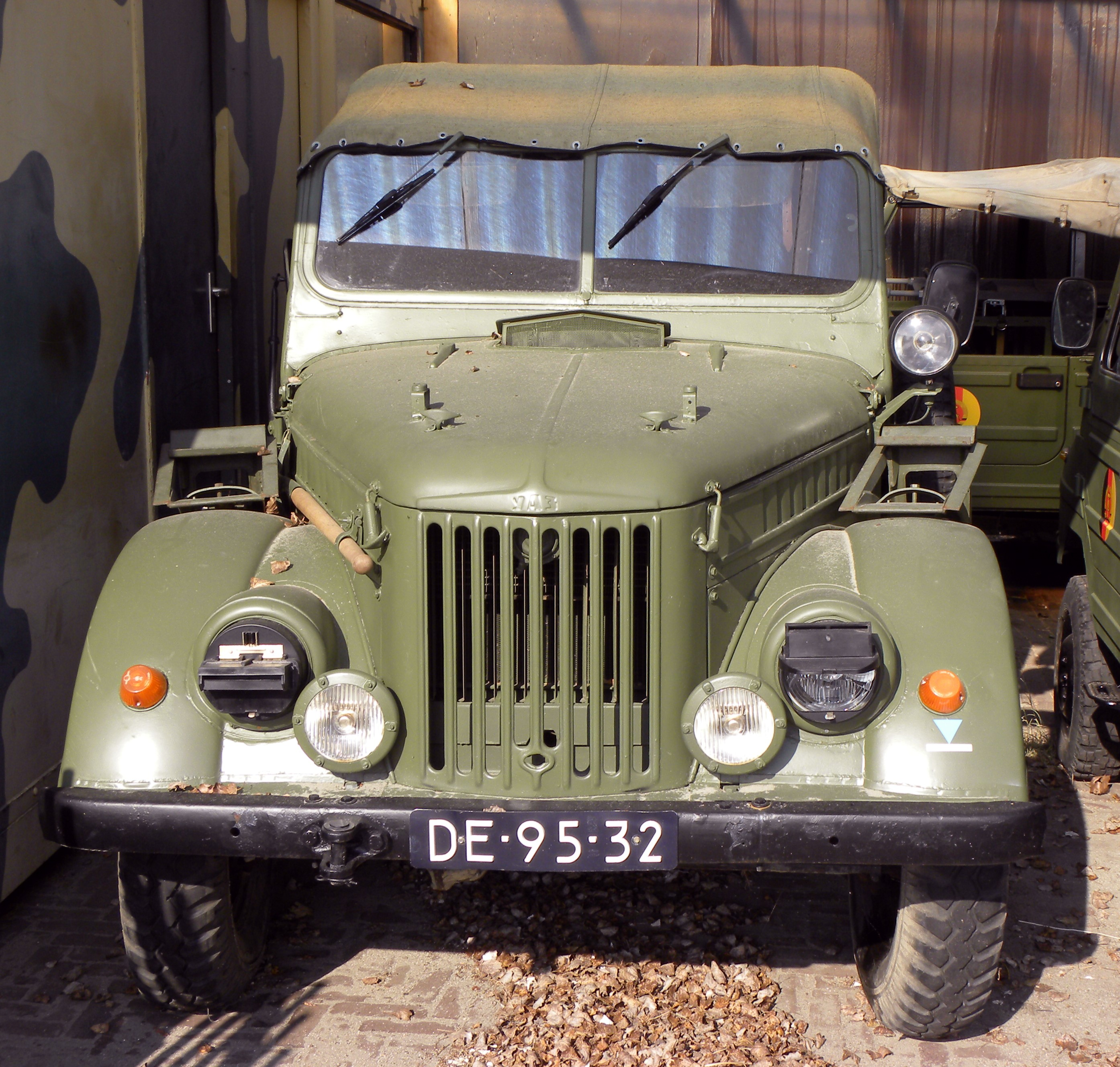
A retired GAZ-69 in the Fort aan den Hoek van Holland in Hook of Holland, Netherlands

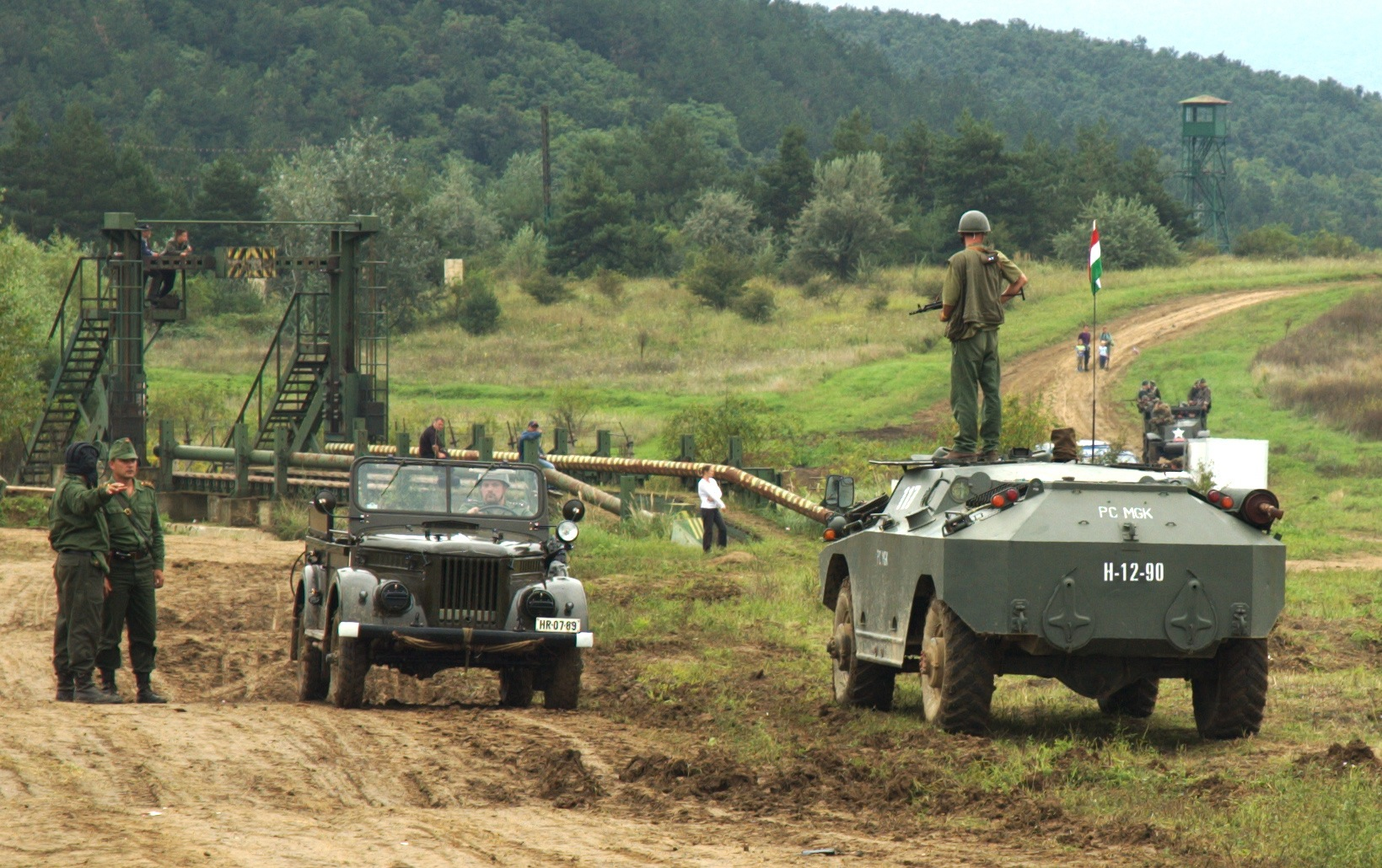
A GAZ-69 of the Hungarian Army

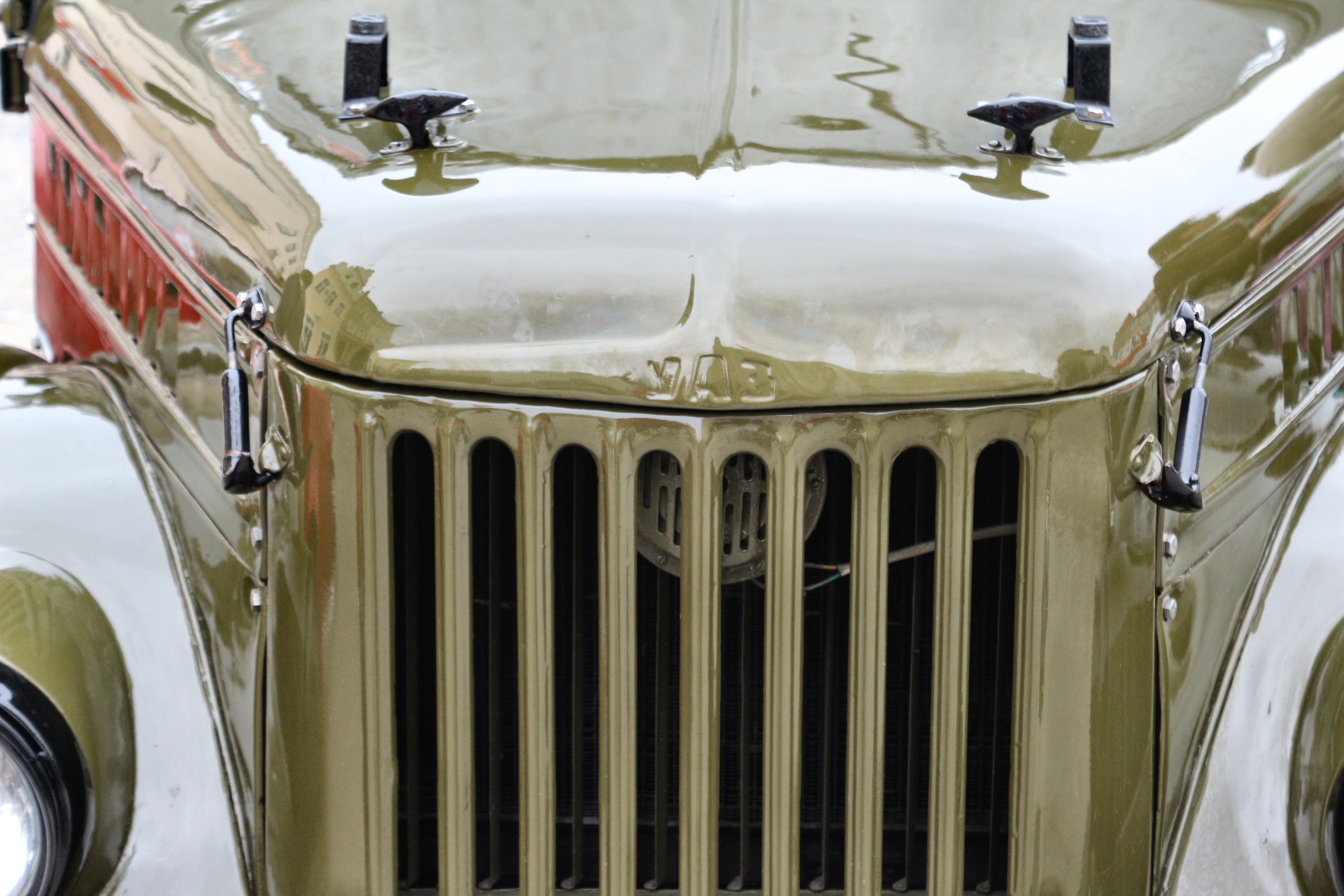
UAZ-69M, front view

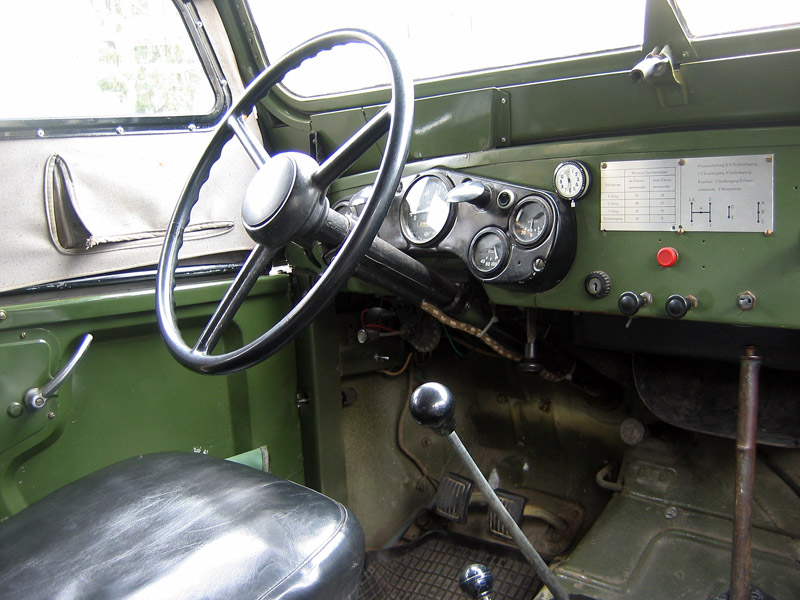
GAZ-69, interior

== See also ==
- Einheits-PKW der Wehrmacht
- Stoewer R200 light off-road car

== Bibliography ==
- Foss, Christopher F. (1976). Military vehicles of the world. New York: Charles Scribner's Sons. ISBN 978-0-684-14678-2 – via Internet Archive.
- Foss, Christopher F.; Gander, Terry J., eds. (1985). Jane's Military Vehicles and Ground Support Equipment 1985 (6th ed.). Jane's Information Group. ISBN 978-0-7106-0811-6.
- United States Department of the Army (1960). Handbook on the Satellite Armies. Headquarters, Department of the Army.
- Kenneth Conboy and Simon McCouaig, The War in Laos 1960-75, Men-at-arms series 217, Osprey Publishing Ltd, London 1989. ISBN 9780850459388
- Zachary Sex & Bassel Abi-Chahine, Modern Conflicts 2 – The Lebanese Civil War, from 1975 to 1991 and Beyond, Modern Conflicts Profile Guide Volume II, AK Interactive, 2021. EAN 8435568306073
