= Vesta Creek (Alberta) =

- Location of the mouth of the creek in Alberta

Location
- Country: Canada
- Province: Alberta
- Region: Northern Alberta
- Census division: No. 17
- Municipal District: County of Northern Lights

Physical characteristics
- Mouth: Keg River
  - coordinates: 57°44′56″N 118°03′59″W
  - elevation: 480 m (1,570 ft)

Basin features
- Progression: Vesta Creek–Keg River–Peace River–Slave River–Great Slave Lake–Mackenzie River
- River system: Mackenzie River drainage basin

Vesta Creek is a stream in the County of Northern Lights in Northern Alberta, Canada. It is in the Mackenzie River drainage basin and is a right tributary of the Keg River.
