= French ship Vestale =

Many ships of the French Navy have been named Vestale including:

- French frigate Vestale launched in 1705 and broken up in 1739
- French frigate Vestale launched in 1756, captured in 1761 and renamed HMS Flora
- French frigate Vestale launched in 1780, captured in 1796 but retaken, captured again in 1799
- French submarine La Vestale launched in 1934 and scrapped in 1946
