= Rocar De Simon 412E =

Romanian trolleybus model

Rocar De Simon U412E
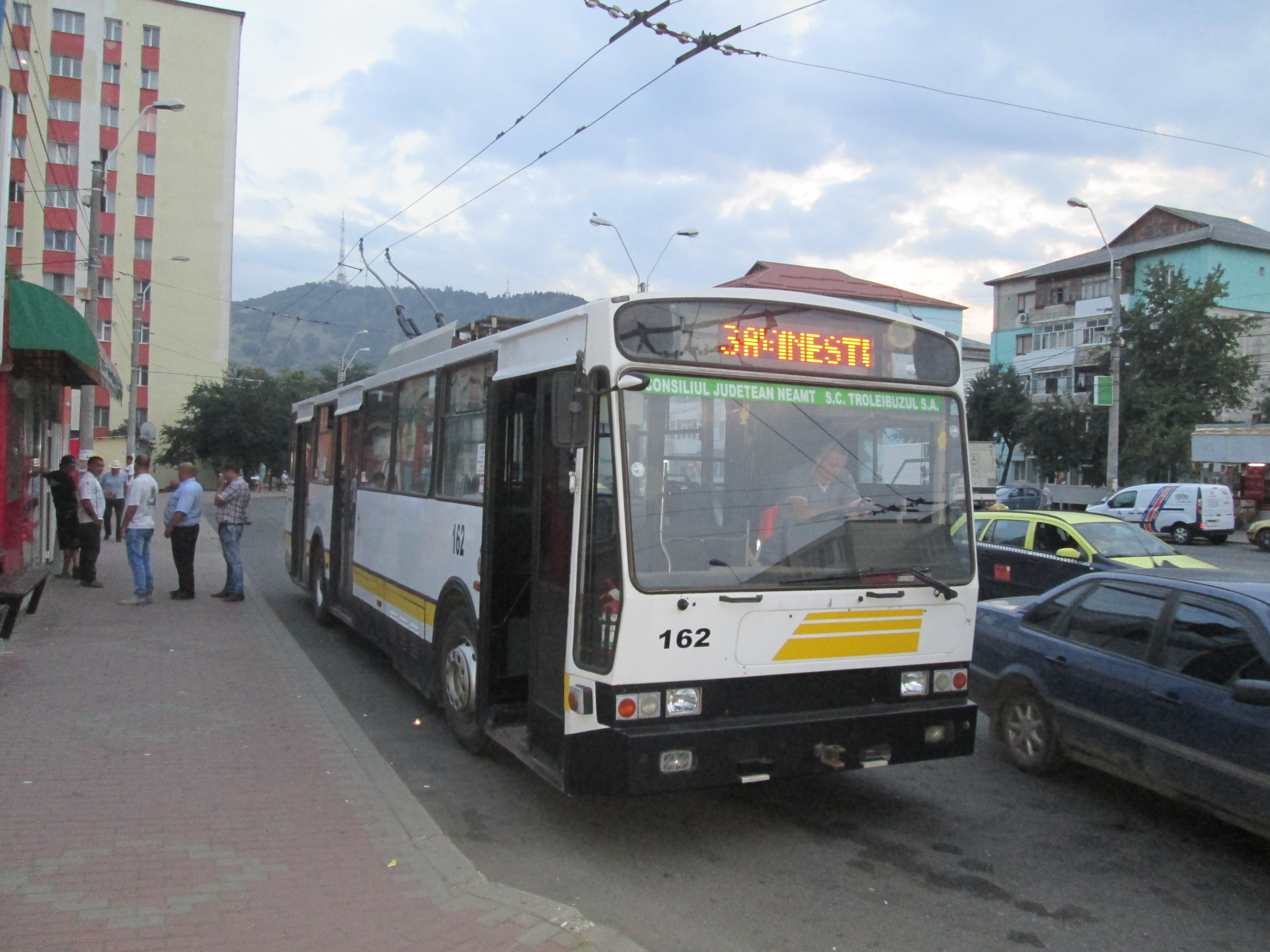
- 162, one of the few remaining examples, seen at the Dărmănești route end, in Piatra Neamț. This is one of the trolleybuses brought from Constanța.

Overview
- Manufacturer: ROCAR

Body and chassis
- Doors: 3 doors
- Floor type: step entrance

Powertrain
- Engine: TN76 or TN81/96
- Power output: 125 or 150 kW
- Transmission: Roman Brasov

Dimensions
- Length: 12 m
- Width: 2.5 m

Rocar De Simon 412E was a model of trolleybus that was manufactured by Rocar in Romania, in 1997 and 2002. A total of only 19 were produced, 18 equipped with DC motors and one with an AC motor. Two were delivered to the Bucharest trolleybus system, #7454 and #7459 (the one on AC), another two were delivered to Cluj and the remaining 15 were delivered to Constanta. Models sent to Constanta are equipped with resistor controller instead of electronic chopper.

Although the bus version was also available with 2 doors, the 412E was only built with the 3-door body. Transmission of all 412E is from Autocamioane Brașov, probably because the motor is somehow identical to the Rocar DAC 112/117/212/217 series. Although it was meant as a replacement for 112/117/212/217 series, they were built in parallel. Like its bus counterpart, it had no articulated version built by ROCAR. Low floor 812E or/and ROCAR Solaris Urbino were designed as its successors, but ROCAR went bankrupt.

5 412E Trolleybuses were sent from Constanta to Piatra Neamt in early 2015, as Constanta shut down its system use in 2010. All 5 are in operation and it is expected for the other 10 to be sent to Piatra Neamt or other cities if needed. They are numbered 158–163. RATB still operates one, #7459, but it was put in storage along with Rocar 812E Trolleybus #7460 due to high maintenance costs. #7454 was scrapped since 2009.

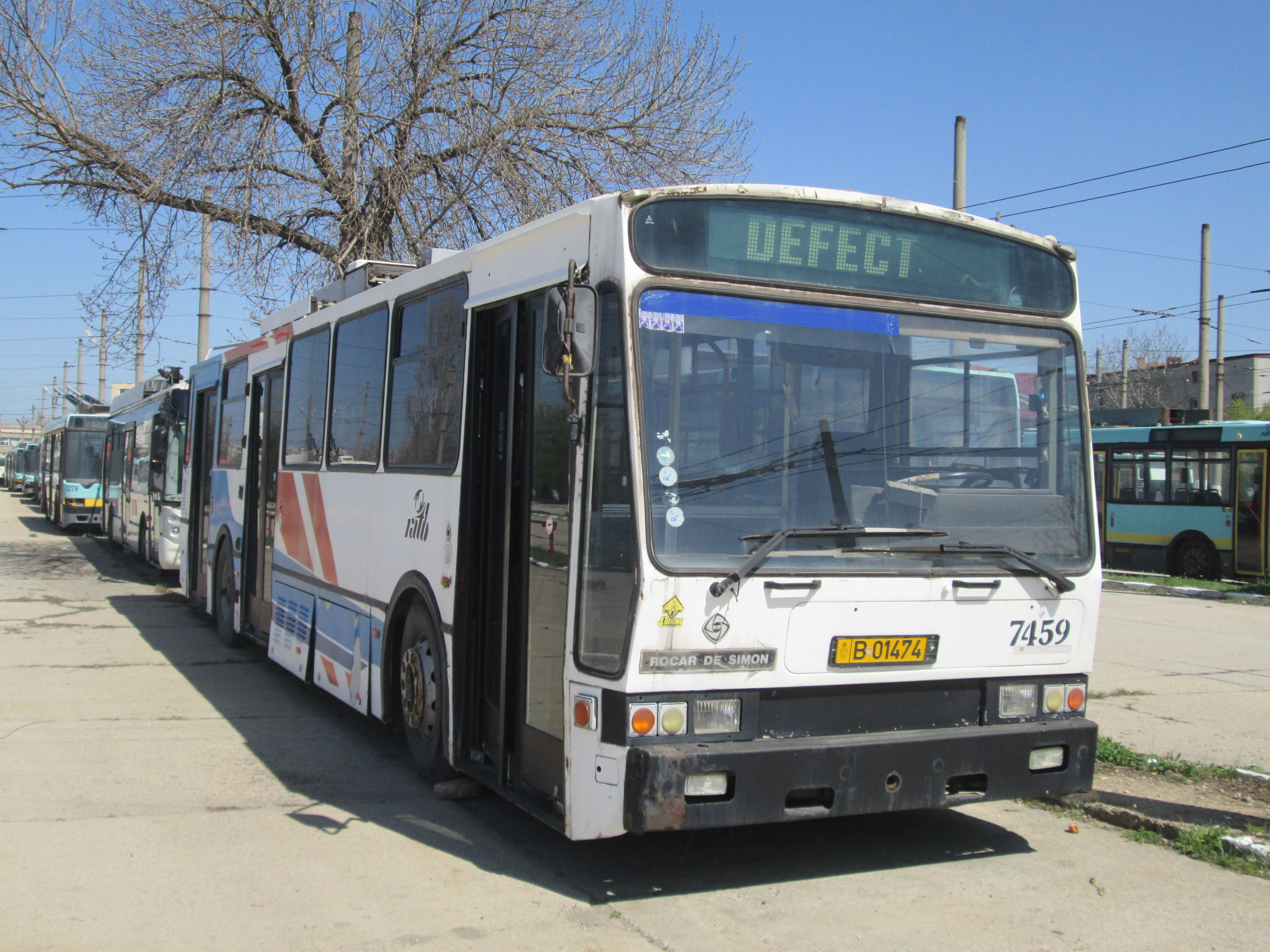
RATB 7459 in the Bujoreni depot, April 2018.

A similar trolleybus was the Inbus F140, built in 1981, scrapped in 2008. The Rocar De Simon bodywork design was based upon multiple De Simon-bodied buses in Italy, including some Inbus designs. Inbus was a collaboration firm between Breda and De Simon, being a popular choice for Italian bus companies in the 1980s.

== See also ==
- Rocar De Simon U412
- Rocar De Simon U412-220
- Rocar De Simon U412-230
- Rocar De Simon U412-260
- Rocar De Simon U412-DAF
