= Rocar De Simon U412-DAF =

Series of Romanian city buses

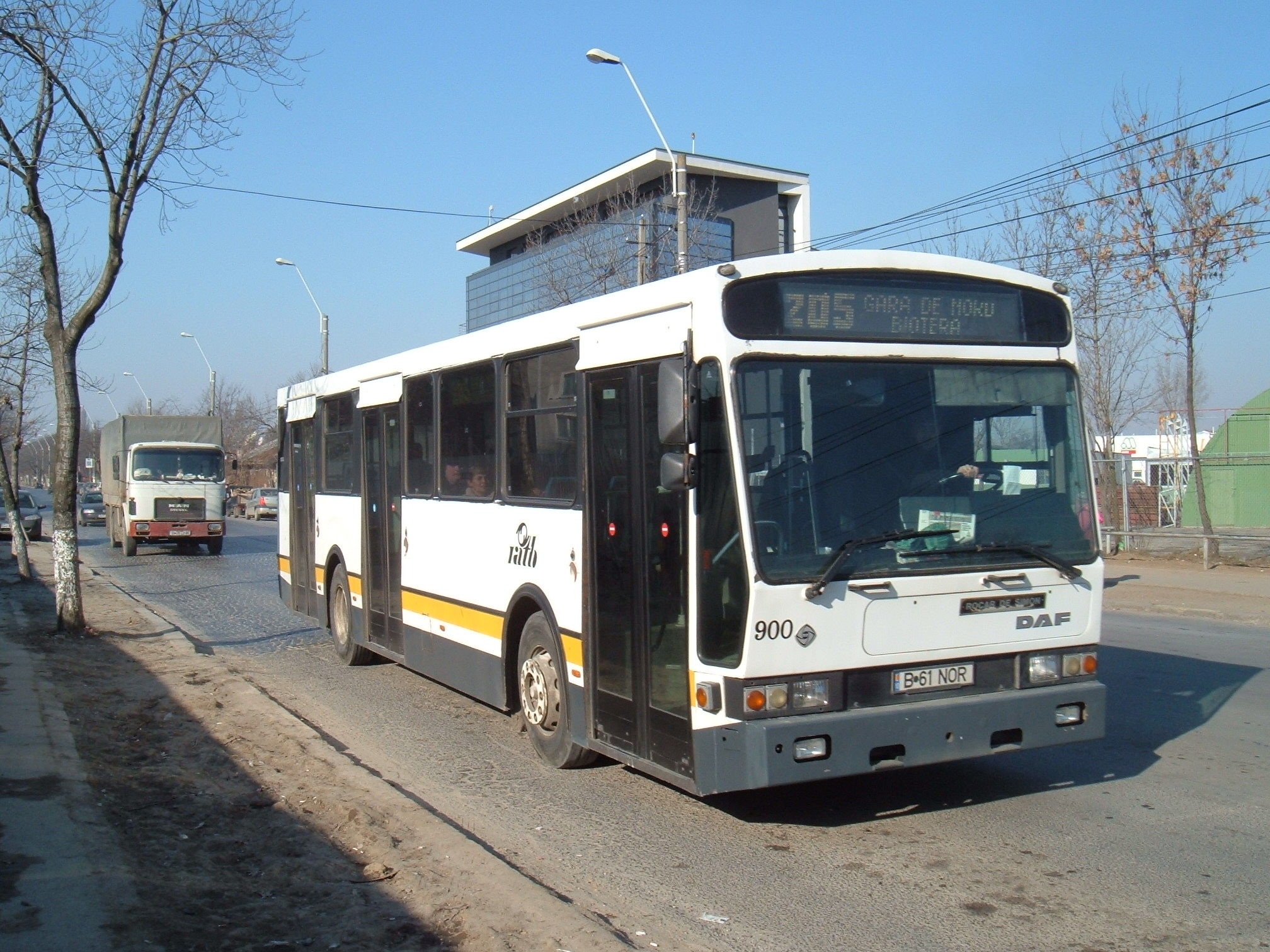

Overview
- Manufacturer: Rocar

Body and chassis
- Doors: 3
- Floor type: Step entrance

Powertrain
- Engine: DAF

Rocar De Simon U412-DAF was a model produced by the Romanian bus and trolleybus manufacturer Rocar. It had De Simon bodywork and DAF engine. Only two U412-DAF were produced, operating in Bucharest with park numbers #900 and #901. They were scrapped in 2008 and 2009.

== See also ==
- Rocar De Simon U412
- Rocar De Simon U412-260
- Rocar De Simon U412E

== Gallery ==
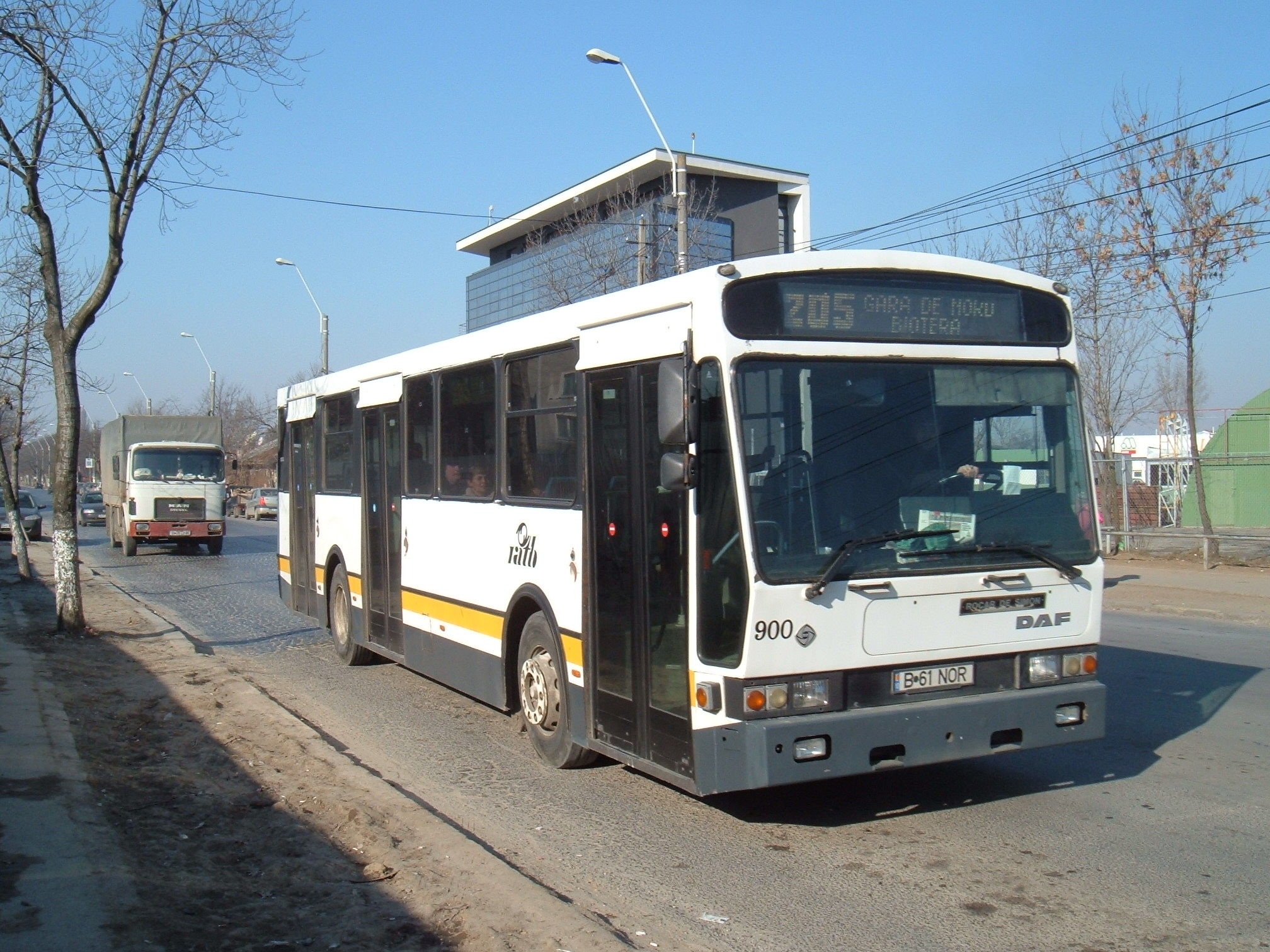
Rocar De Simon U412-DAF #900.

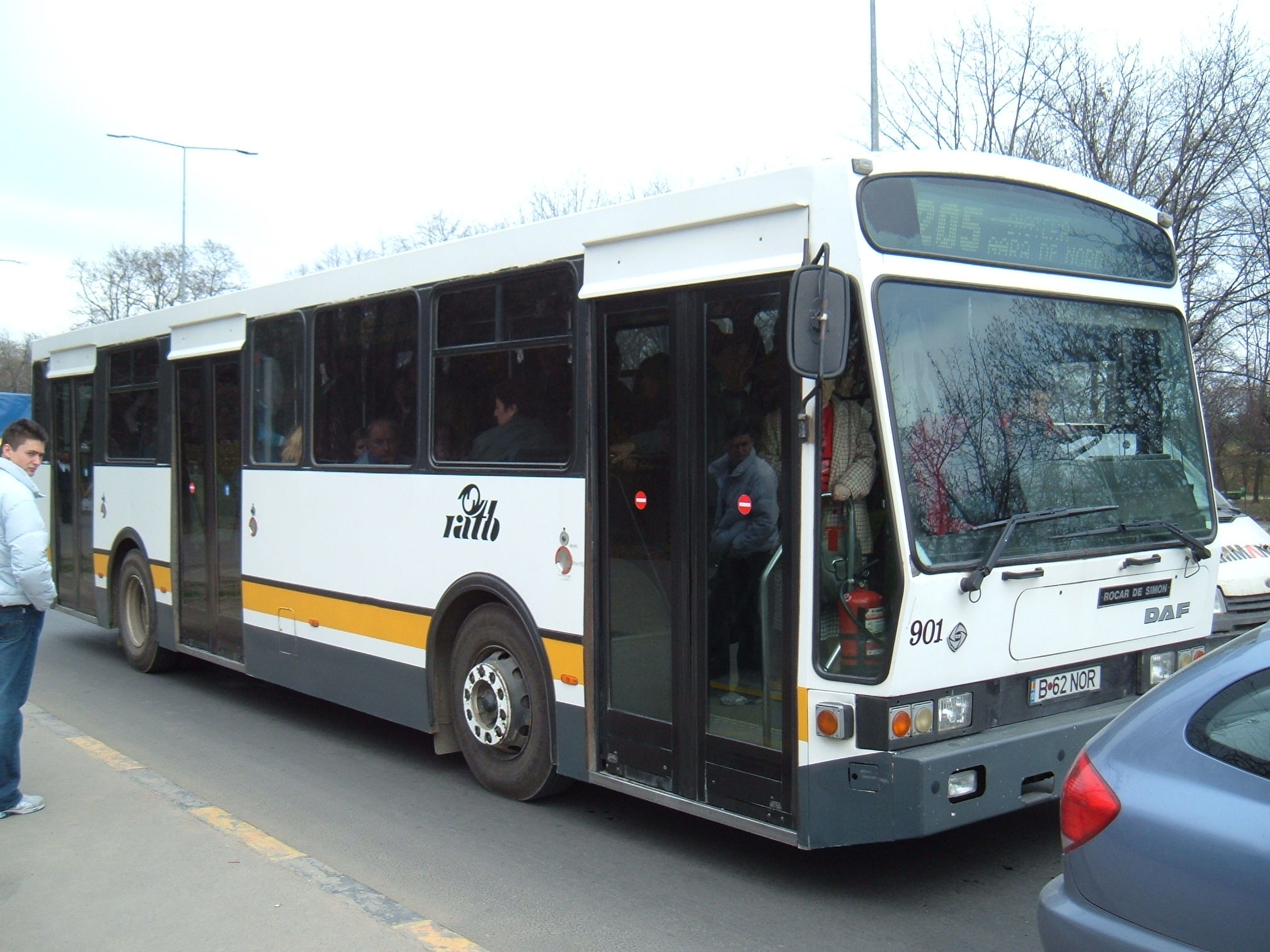
Rocar De Simon U412-DAF #901.
