= Rocar De Simon U412 =

Romanian city bus

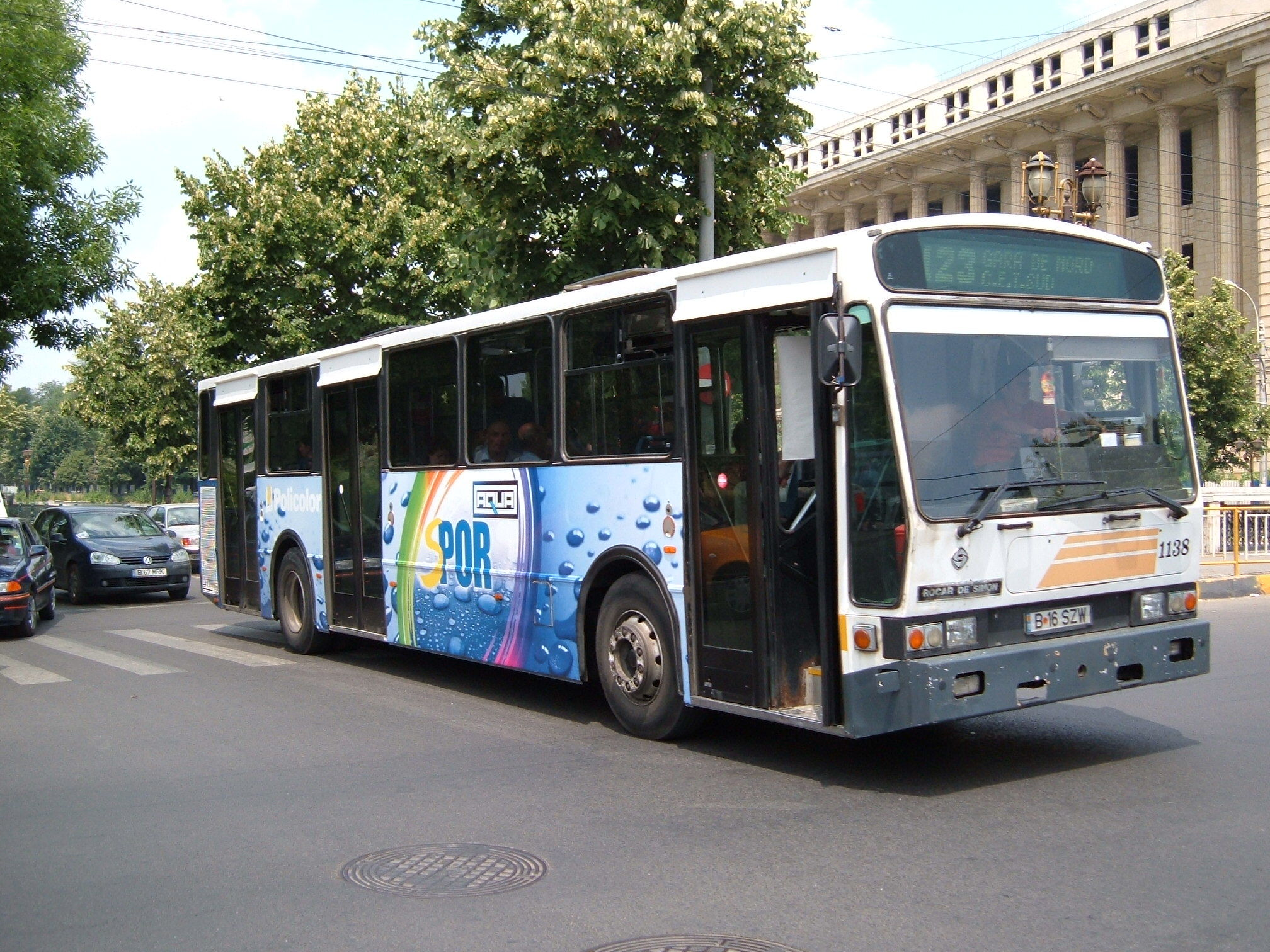
- Rocar de Simon U412-260 in Bucharest (operated by RATB)

Overview
- Manufacturer: Rocar/De Simon

Body and chassis
- Doors: Available with 2 and 3 doors, slightly reduced wheelbase on 2-door versions
- Floor type: Step entrance

Powertrain
- Engine: MAN engine
- Power output: 220 hp, 230 hp and 260 hp
- Transmission: Automatic, Voith Diwa. On 220 and 230 hp and 412E rear axle made by ROMAN BRASOV, 260 Version with RABA axle; also versions with manual transmission were manufactured

Chronology
- Predecessor: Rocar DAC
- Successor: None. It was meant to be replaced by E/U812 Autodromo BusOtto or Solaris Urbino, but Rocar went bankrupt

The Rocar De Simon U412 was a city bus model manufactured jointly by Rocar and De Simon in Romania with an Italian constructed bus body (Inbus 210).

== History ==
The model, introduced early 1994 (UL70 series also called U412-220 UL70) and produced until 2002, was mostly used in Bucharest's bus network operated by RATB even though some U 412-260s are also used in other Romanian cities such as Braşov, Cluj-Napoca, Galati, Craiova, and Oradea.

Rocar De Simon buses also were used by the army and the MAI. Used as a coach, it was also equipped with air conditioning, and it had 2 doors (front and mid). Also some Rocar De Simon buses were sold to some particulars, mainly versions with 2 doors, but also with 3 doors. 2-door versions are also available with a slightly shorter wheelbase. Rocar De Simon was built in 7 versions: U412-220 UL70, U412-220, U412-230, U412-260, U412E (trolleybus), U412 DAF (with DAF platform), and some 2-door versions based on U412-260, with slightly lower wheelbase.

STB has withdrawn all of them from service (including trolleybus 7454), because some of them were severely worn out, but also because RATB wanted to operate solely low-floor busses with air conditioning. The only vehicle remaining at STB based on Rocar De Simon is trolleybus #7459. Some of them were scrapped (the most severely worn out), but some of them are still in some garages of STB in conservation, not in regular use for public transport, they are used for internal purposes or are proposed either for scrapping or sale.

A major problem RATB discovered at these buses after a few years of operation, was the broken chassis, either the rear console was bending, either some busses were bending at the mid, probably because frequently overloading them. It is one of the main reasons RATB removed them from regular service, apart from the fact that RATB wanted solely low-floor buses. RATB removed Rocar De Simon buses from operation in mid to late 2011. All of them were replaced with low-floor buses, Mercedes-Benz Citaro type.

Rocar De Simon was quite a modern vehicle at its time, actual design, having MAN Euro 2 engines, automatic transmission (although vehicles with manual transmission also existed), ABS, electronic controlled air suspension (ECAS), tubeless tires (although some were delivered with tube type wheel assembly), Fluorescent lighting of the saloon, plastic (sometimes with upholstery) seats, Blaupunkt sound system with public address with bus vox system announcing the stations, electrical ventilating rooftops, heated saloon, STOP button in the saloon (for announcing the driver to stop at some desired stations) and some safety features (like hammer for crashing the windows in case of fire), and many of them were equipped with electronic display (few of them were even equipped with luminescent display). Despite these advantages, it didn't prove very successful, mainly due to low number of manufactured vehicles, as only about 400 vehicles were manufactured between 1994 and 2002 (taking in consideration all its versions (220, 230, 260) and derivate vehicles – coach, trolleybus, shorter wheelbase version), and probably by concurrence (mainly second hand vehicles but also some new busses) and high price. However, it was bought in low numbers by other public transport companies around Romania and some particulars.

It had no successor because ROCAR went bankrupt, although its successors were meant to be either Rocar 812 series (based on Autodromo BusOtto platform) only one bus and one trolleybus were made in 1998, or ROCAR SOLARIS URBINO in 2002 (the last attempt before ROCAR went bankrupt, only one piece was spotted, but unknown if it was badged ROCAR or it was really built by ROCAR). Rocar De Simon was meant to be the successor of DAC/Rocar 112/212 and 117/217 series based on the older Roman 112 UD, but they continued the production of the later in parallel with De Simon until 2000. De Simon bus series, although originally had an articulated version, ROCAR never built articulated De Simon. It was the last bus ever made by ROCAR, its production ceased in 2002 some months before ROCAR officially declared Bankruptcy. Unlike Rocar 112/117/212/217 series which were exported to some countries, Rocar De Simon was not officially exported (at least no model is known to be sold outside Romania). All built vehicles, were delivered and operated in Romania. Rocar de Simon busses (so for Rocar 812 Autodromo BusOtto) were unaffected by the bankruptcy of its mother factory, ROCAR, compared to many other ROCAR products (apart from the fact they were outdated), as spare parts were (and sometimes are) widely available, because it was produced with components also used by many other manufacturers, some of them being interchangeable. Body parts like panels, glasses, tail lights and headlights could be brought from Italy or other countries which were operating De Simon Buses.

== Subtypes ==
- Rocar De Simon U412-220 UL70: It was operated only by RATB, and there were 6 vehicles. It can be easily recognized by the window under the windshield, on the right side. It was equipped with MAN engine, 220 Hp, Automatic transmission, and rear axle was IABV. It had no electronic display, only with painted board. Stood at Militari Garage. First series of Rocar De Simon, built in 1994.
- Rocar De Simon U412-220 and U412-230: mainly the same with U412-220 UL70, or slightly more powerful engine, 230 hp at U412-230. Had electronic display, like UL70 had the front spoiler built from 2 sections, and some of them had the front spoiler painted orange (mostly U412-220). Stood at Militari garage, and operated solely by RATB. The window under the windshield which was present on UL70 was removed. Built between early 1995 and late 1996. Craiova also received 2 Rocar De Simon U412-230.
- Rocar De Simon U412-260: the most popular version of Rocar De Simon, and the most numerous, operated by several other transport companies in Romania, but RATB was its main operator. Rear axle is RABA type with no gear reducer, it is equipped with WABCO ABS. Front spoiler built in one piece. Like other Rocar De Simons, it had Electronic Controlled Air Suspension, leaning a little when doors ere open to facilitate getting in and out. This version was also sent to Brasov (1 vehicle), Galati (2 vehicles), Cluj (6 vehicles), Oradea (5 vehicles), built from late 1996 to 2002. Also sold to some particulars. To be mentioned that vehicles with manual transmission also existed.
- Rocar De Simon U412-DAF: only two versions built, operated solely by RATB; can be easily recognized by shorter wheelbase
- Rocar De Simon U412E: Trolleybus version, only 19 built, between mid 1997 and 2002. Rear axle is the same with De Simon U412-220/230, and has an engine of 125-150 kW. Operated by RATB (Bucharest) - 2 vehicles (one with chopper, one with AC Motor and Kiepe Electric Equipment), RATUC (Cluj Napoca) - 2 vehicles, RATC (Constanta, not equipped with CHOPPER!) - 15 vehicles, Piatra Neamt (5 vehicles - from Constanta).
- Rocar De Simon U412-260 2 doors, painted green. 2 vehicles were spotted, one belongs to MAI, ARMY, used as coach, equipped with A/C, the other was a particular bus. It had a slightly shorter wheelbase than 3-doors model and 2 doors (front and mid). Probably built as custom vehicle or designed for interurban lines, however no such vehicle is known to be operated by any public transport company in Romania.
