= Rocar =

Defunct Romanian bus manufacturer

Rocar S.A.
- Type: Public company
- Industry: Bus manufacturing
- Founded: 1951
- Defunct: 2004
- Headquarters: Bucharest, Romania
- Products: Buses, trolleybuses, vans

Rocar (also T.V. or Autobuzul) was a van, light truck, bus and trolleybus manufacturer based in Bucharest, Romania. The firm also produced light offroad vehicles and later heavy road vehicles. During its existence, the company produced over 350,000 vehicles.

== History ==
Tudor Vladimirescu (T.V.) Works (Romanian: Uzinele Tudor Vladimirescu), named after the revolutionary Tudor Vladimirescu, was created in 1951, and the first production lines were made for rolling-stock equipment and agricultural machinery. From the 1960s much of T.V.'s motor vehicle production was based on use of domestic parts like components and mechanicals sourced from other Romanian manufacturers like ARO, Brasov, DAC, and SR.

In 1956, the first bus was built on a truck frame, and in 1957 the production program was enlarged also for trolleybuses, mini-buses and pick-ups made after T.V.'s own designs. Beginning with 1968, Rocar started exporting vehicles in Eastern Europe, Africa, South America and Middle East and, in 1971, it bought a license from MAN, Germany. In 1974, its name changed to Întreprinderea "Autobuzul" (English: "The Bus" Company).

During the 1980s, due to harsh economy and shortages, the quality of ROCAR (Autobuzul) products decreased a lot, only export vehicles were of better quality. ROCAR issued a lot of prototypes, but very few of them went into series production. Also, with few exceptions, Autobuzul/ROCAR vehicles were almost omnipresent in Romania in the domain of passenger transport vehicles and light-to-medium weight charges, as imports were banned in Romania. In the late 1990s, all 19 trolleybus systems then operating in Romania had ROCAR trolleybuses in their fleets. This situation would change after 1990 with the fall of communism in Romania. Until the 1990s, "Autobuzul" made exports to Bulgaria, Hungary, Soviet Union (later Ukraine), East Germany, Madagascar, Benin, Burundi, Iraq, Colombia, and the United States.

After 1990, Rocar (as it became known from 1991) started a cooperation with the bodywork company De Simon from Italy. During the 1990s, ROCAR lost most of its customers (urban transport companies), mainly because of the old technology which led to low quality, low production capacity, and high prices – therefore many of their former customers bought second-hand buses and trolleybuses from the west, causing ROCAR high losses around the turn of the millennium until 2002, when it went bankrupt. In an attempt at building market share they launched a low-floor bus and low-floor trolleybus in cooperation with the Italian company Autodromo in the 1990s, named 812, but because of low production capacity leading to a high price, it proved unattractive. ROCAR lost many employees between 1990 and 2002, either retired or found another job (in RATB, Truck & Bus services, car service, etcetera). Between 1990 and 2002 very few exports were made, while domestic demand was also very low.

However, in 1996 ROCAR signed a contract with RATB and Bucharest Local Council for buses, therefore over 300 buses Rocar De Simon U412 were delivered between 1996 and 2002, and also renewed some manufacturing technologies, but the number of built vehicles was still too low, however after the moment when RATB hurt ROCAR some years before, by acquiring new DAF buses and some second hand buses, and later new Ikarus 415T trolleybuses. Trolleybuses were not any more from ROCAR, however 14 ROCAR trolleybuses were delivered to RATB. However, the contract with RATB and Bucharest local Council did not improve the deteriorating situation of ROCAR of the mid to late '90s, because other public transport companies (and other customers like The Army or Interurban Transport Operators) in Romania completely refused to buy its products (main reason stated by them being the low-quality products, prices are too high, low availability due to low production capacities, outdated, and they were acquiring instead second hand or other new vehicles mostly (except for The Army, which were buying GRIVBUS or other new vehicles). ROCAR was also affected by competition of two new Romanian manufacturers of buses, trolleybuses and light weight transport vehicles, the same profile of ROCAR: ASTRA BUS ARAD, a new Romanian bus and trolleybus manufacturer, under IRISBUS and Grivbus – another new Romanian bus and light weight transport vehicles manufacturer. They took some of ROCAR's customers, like RATB, Army, and some public transport operators as these two newer manufacturers were using newer technologies, manufacturing more actual vehicles, and with a better quality, and a higher capacity of production and lower prices. In 2001–2002, ROCAR signed a contract with Constanta Council for 100 buses and 40 trolleybuses, but only 15 trolleybuses were delivered, two of them in half assembled state. Few buses were delivered to Constanta but were having major manufacturing deficiencies, therefore they were returned. However, Constanta Council paid for the undelivered buses. Massive second hand bus imports from west which continued in Romania even after 2000, and also contracts with ex-Soviet manufacturer MAZ and some other manufacturers (Irisbus, Isuzu, BMC) gradually sent ROCAR to lack of demand and finally to bankruptcy. Rocar, after 1990, also suffered from technology retard, using outdated technologies, manufacturing outdated products (some of them even 30 years old!) in low capacity, and at high prices, thus leading ROCAR to huge losses and loss of employees. Although Rocar De Simon U412 was a fairly modern vehicle with EURO 2 engine and automatic transmission, and chopper in case of some trolleybuses it did not prove a very big success, as many other transport companies still preferred second hand buses/trolleybuses or other new buses/trolleybuses (MAN, Mercedes, MAZ, Ikarus, BMC), accentuating the deteriorating situation of ROCAR. Rocar De Simon (E/U 412) remained in production until the factory went bankrupt. As a last attempt in their struggle, ROCAR was courted by SOLARIS BUS, for a partnership to assemble URBINO buses from Poland as CKD, but eventually cooperation between ROCAR and SOLARIS BUS failed, only one vehicle is supposed to be built (other said that only the badge ROCAR was attached to it, the bus was in fact made in Poland). However, in the past, many other well known manufacturers (like Scania, DAF, Renault, Volvo, Mercedes, even MAZ (they wanted a partnership with ROCAR in mid to late 2000, just like the one with De Simon, to assemble buses as CKD delivered by MAZ, models 103, 104, 105,107 were proposed) wanted to buy ROCAR or wanted partnership with ROCAR for assembling buses, trolleybuses and light commercial vans, but eventually gave up, and after 2000, no company showed any interest. In Romania, ROCAR was the only bus, trolleybus and small commercial vehicle manufacturer, until ASTRA BUS ARAD and GRIVBUS appeared on the market. Rocar officially stopped production in early 2002 as there was no more demand for their products (however, production was restarted in the summer of 2002, but very few vehicles were built), exports were down, many workers left because they were unpaid for months, and by the late 2002 production fully ended and ROCAR went into bankruptcy, however not before last vehicles were delivered to companies which acquired them. Debts were at a very high level as were the losses. In the early 2003, while ROCAR was in its last days of life they made some repairs and reconditioning to some old buses belonging to the army and some other bigger companies (like Dacia), however no new demands were registered, and losses increased. In late 2003 and early 2004, the company was liquidated and removed from the registry of commerce, ending 52 years of bus manufacturing in Romania. Its successors are from now on, Grivbus and Astra Bus Arad. Some half assembled vehicles were sold to (or taken by) some customers together with spare parts and assembled by the customer, some other unassembled vehicles were sold as spare parts to customers which had previously acquired ROCAR products. Spare parts remaining in the factory were also taken by companies which were operating ROCAR vehicles, probably as a debt, or by companies which were selling spare parts. It is rumored that some of these were sold by liquidators in order to recover some losses. Other old type vehicles remained unassembled in the factory were scrapped as they had no value, however many of their former customers were, by now, affording new modern vehicles.

Some ROCAR trolleybuses remained in service long after the company's demise. The fleet of the small trolleybus system in Târgu Jiu was still composed entirely of ROCAR trolleybuses in 2017, and ultimately that system was the last anywhere to operate ROCAR trolleybuses in service. The last active vehicles were retired in early 2022.

ROCAR also had a football team called Rocar Football Team, and had a football terrain and stadium. Also it had a high school, today named Grigore Cerchez.

== Product line ==
=== City buses ===
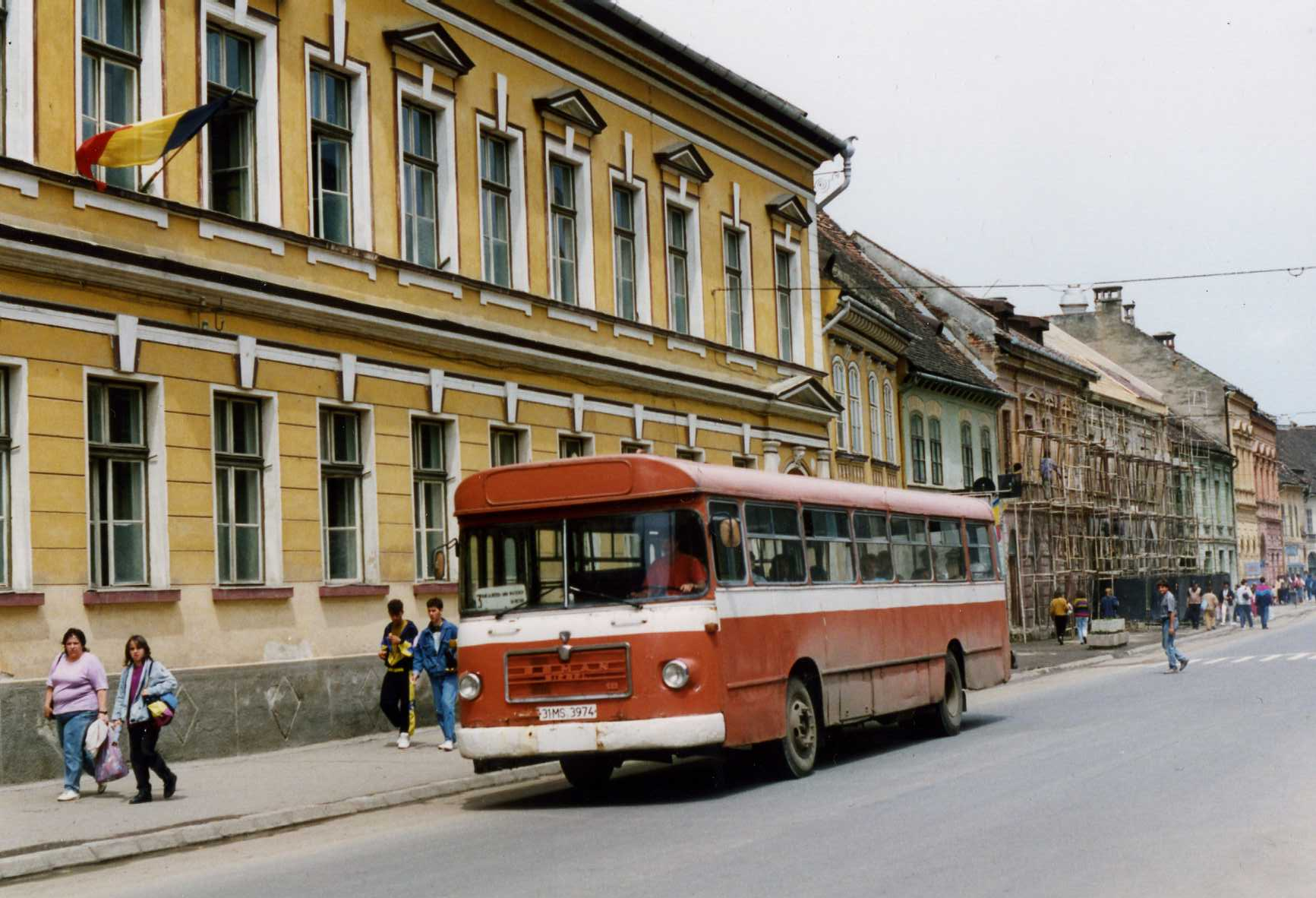
Roman 112U in Sighișoara

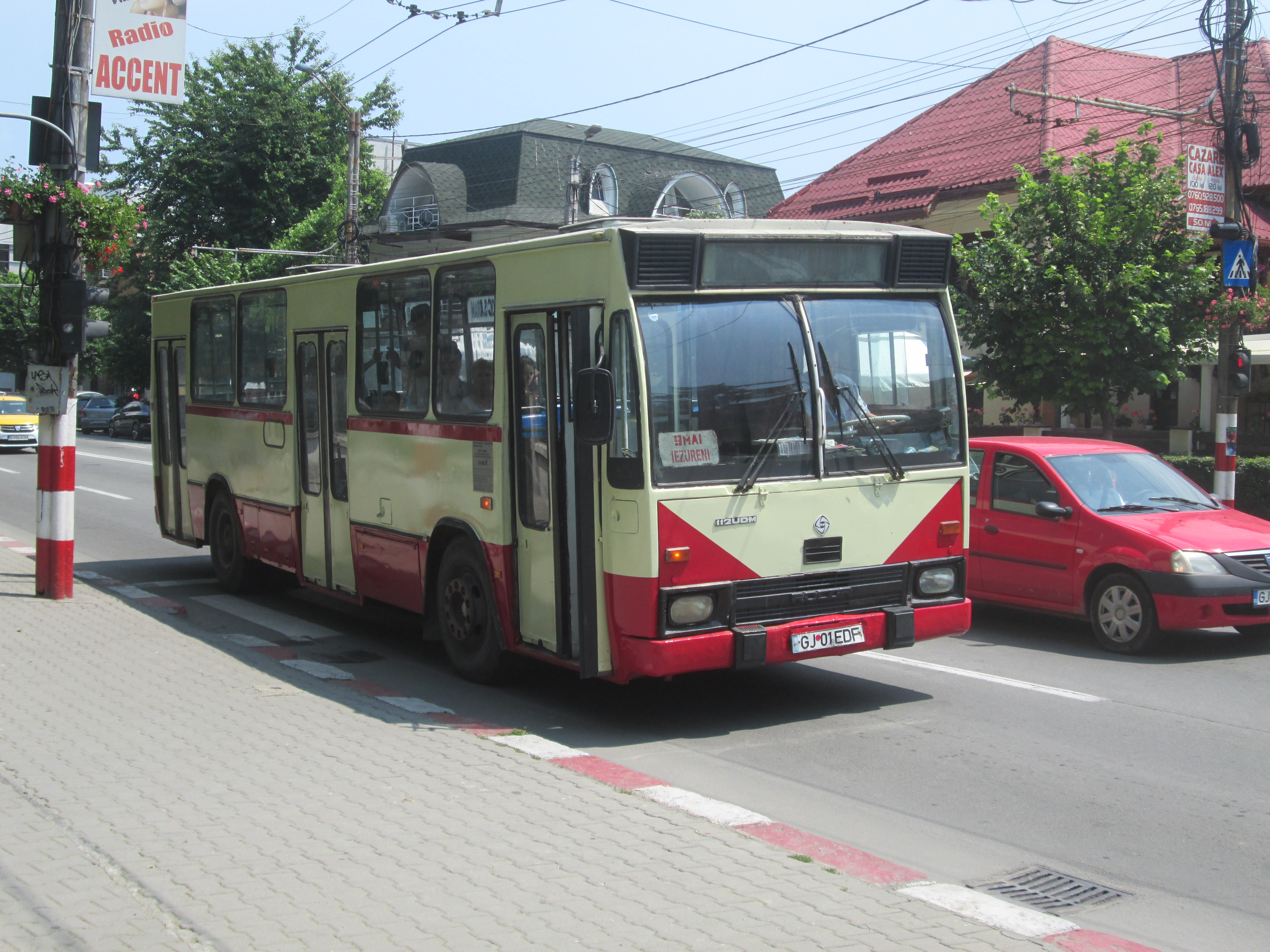
DAC 112UDM in Târgu Jiu

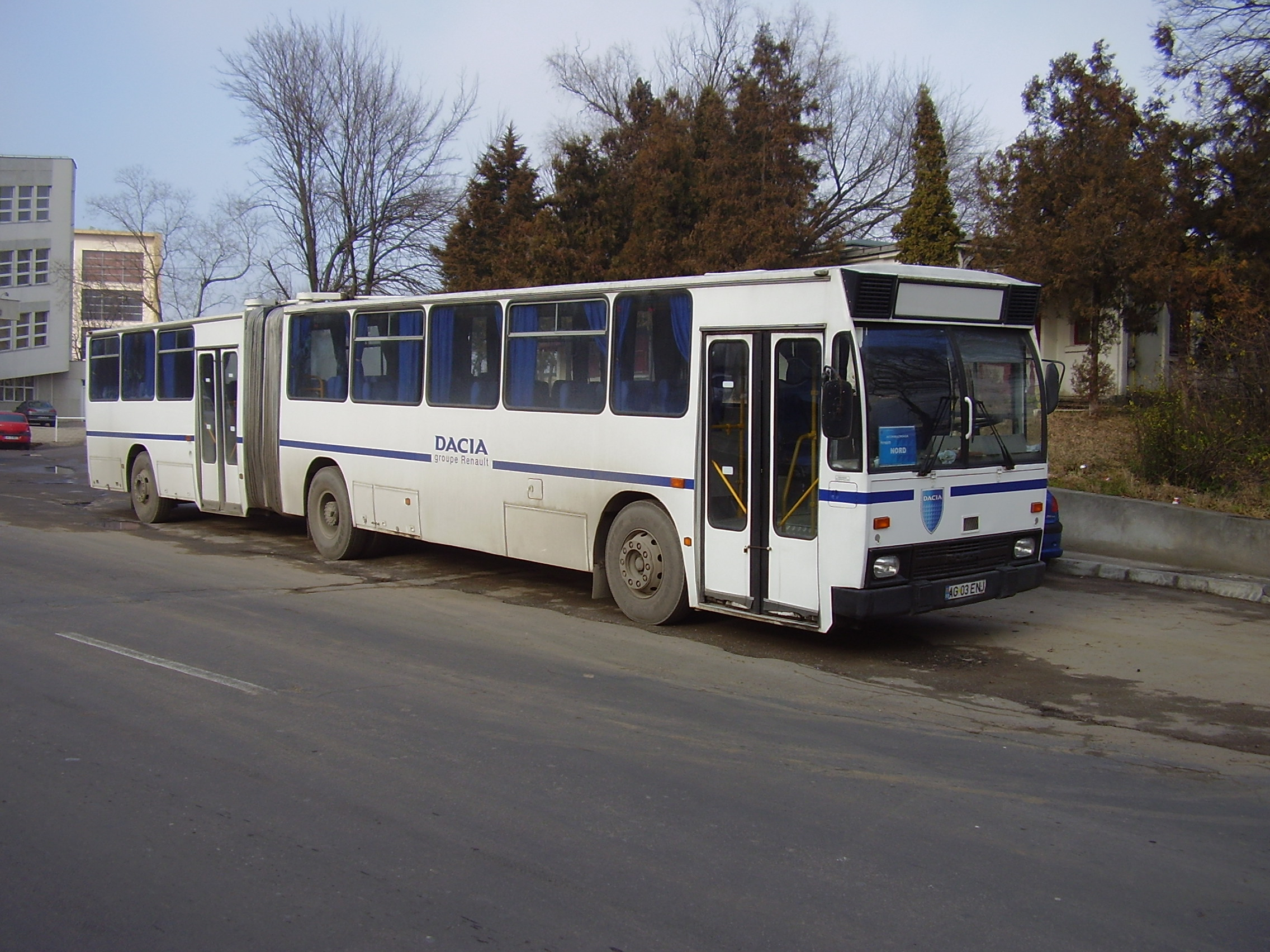
DAC 117UD in Pitești

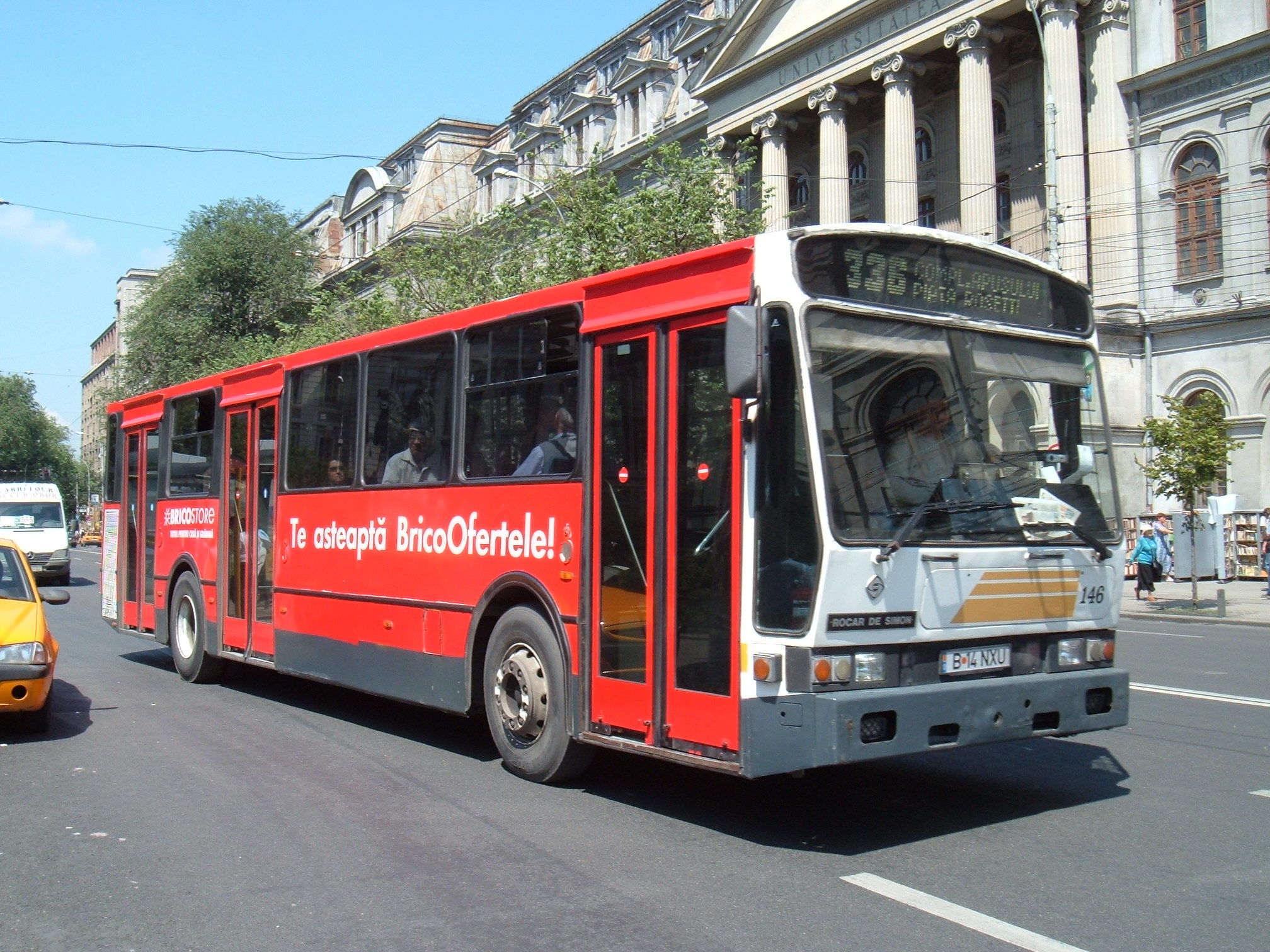
Rocar De Simon U412 in Bucharest

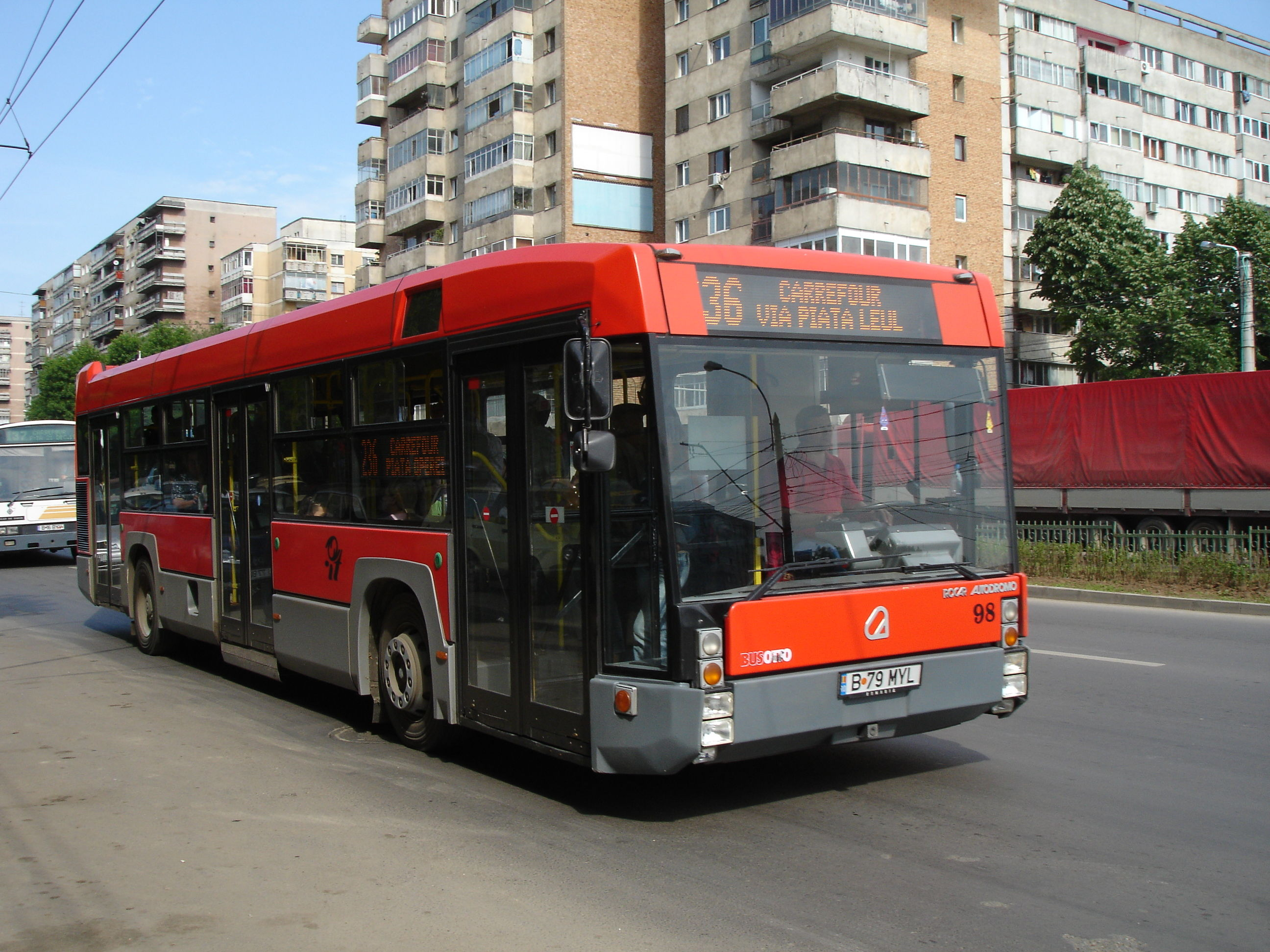
Rocar U812 Autodromo

- M.T.D. – Also called Mao Tze Dun, is the first bus manufactured between 1955 and 1958. It was first built at Vulcan Works in cooperation with URAC ITB, and then the production was moved to Rocar. It was mounted on a SR 201 truck chassis, and equipped with a SR101 engine (or ZIS120), 90 HP. 8 metres long, 85 passengers.
- T.V. 1 – built from 1959 to 1960 on the chassis of a SR101 truck. One of the first buses from ROCAR (Autobuzul). It had a capacity of 86+1 passengers. Equipped with a 5.5 liters engine and 95 Hp gas engine from SR101. It was about 10 metres long. Top speed:6 0 km/h
- T.V. 2 – based on the SR101 truck chassis, but with a more modern architecture, with the engine mounted on the rear. Built between 1960 and 1968. Until 1962 it was equipped with the SR101 engine of 95 hp, but later was equipped with the SR114 engine of 140 hp. Top speed: 65 km/h and 80 km/h respectively. 87 passengers capacity, 10 metres long. It was available in urban version (TV 2 U), interurban version (TV 2 R), and trolleybus version TV 2 E. In the 1970s, some of these buses were converted to diesel, using a SAVIEM D797-05 engine, or surviving models in the 1980s were converted to methane gas powered vehicles. Some higher comfort coach versions were equipped with 4 round headlights.
- T.V. 7/71 R (Midibus) – A mid-sized bus, 7 metres long and about 29+30 passengers, built in 1964-67 (T.V. 7), and 1967–73 (T.V. 71R). Designed for interurban operations, or mountain routes. Equipped with a SR 113/114 gas engine. Top speed: 70 km/h. TV71 R is a slightly modernised variant in 1967.
- T.V. 20 U/R (Urban/Rutier) – A bus manufactured between 1968 and 1975. It is mainly identical with its predecessor, TV 2. Built in Urban, interurban and trolleybus version. 10 metres long, 90+1 passengers. Bus versions were equipped with SR114 gas engine, 140 hp. In the 1970s, some of these buses were converted to diesel, with D797-05 SAVIEM engine. Some other models, were converted to operate on methane gas in the late 1970s early 1980s on surviving models. Top speed: 75 km/h. It was replaced in ROCAR's line up in 1974 with much more modern MAN based buses.
- Roman Diesel A8 (1974–78), A-83 (1983–87)
- Roman 109 RDM (1976–78) – is a mid-size coach, equipped with a Saviem D797-05 engine. It has a capacity of 37 passengers. 9 metres long
- Roman 108 RD – Midsize coach, based on 109 RDM. 7,8 metres long. 37 passengers. Available with 4x2 and 4x4 transmission.
- Roman 112 UD – the predecessor of DAC U112, with mainly the same technical specifications as its successor. It was manufactured under MAN Metrobus (de) licence. No articulated version. It was produced between 1974 and 1980, and operated by many transport companies in Romania.
- DAC U112 UDM – 27+78+1 passengers; independent suspension; engine: D 2156 HM 81 U – 192 HP between the axles; mechanical gear box, 4 + 1 gears or 6+1 gears; top speed: 71 km/h; Also available with turbo charged 240 HP engine.
- DAC U117 UD (articulated city bus) – 42+102+1 passengers; engine options: D 2156 HM 81 U – 192 HP / D 2156 MT 81 U – 240 HP; mechanical gear box, 4 + 1 gears or 6+1 gears; top speed: 71 km/h
- ROCAR 211 UD and 211 R – Probably a partially low-floor vehicle from ROCAR (only front and mid door were low-floor) manufactured between probably late 1980s and early 1990s. Built in very small numbers, probably 2, served in RATB for a short time as test vehicles. It was equipped with D2156HMU TURBO 240 HP engine, and had a capacity for 86+24+1 passengers. Engine placed in the rear. Also called PELICAN. 211R version probably equipped with import engines. In the presenting flyers it was also shown with A/C unit. Probably did not enter mass production due to low capacity of ROCAR, lack of investments and researching, but also probably due to low demand and lack of interest from other possible customers. One has the older sign of ROCAR while it was named Autobuzul (a T included in a V, TV from Tudor Vladimirescu) suggesting it was made somewhere in the 1980s or very early 1990s and the other had the name ROCAR on its front, suggesting it was made after 1993.
- U312 – 25+78+1 passengers; rigid front axle; engine: RABA D 10 UTS – 245 HP – Euro 2 between the axles; automatic transmission, Voith DIWA D863.1, 3 + 1 gears; top speed: 67 km/h. Many models were also built with manual transmission and D2156 HM 81U- 192 HP, also the 240 HP turbocharged version was available.
- U412 (De Simon bodywork) – 25+75+1 passengers; rigid front axle; engine: MAN D 0826 LUH 13 – 260 HP – Euro 2; located in rear hang; automatic transmission, Voith DIWA D851.2, 3 + 1 gears; top speed: 75 km/h. However, some models were also delivered with manual transmission.
- Rocar U512 – a single vehicle was seen (and probably the only one built) and sold to a particular customer (unknown if more than one were built). It was powered by a MAN engine, identical to Rocar 412, but 230 hp, according to front badge. Unknown whether it was equipped with manual or automatic transmission. It was probably a prototype, however it resembles closely a De Simon. Painted in yellow and white. The rest of the bodies were used probably for E512 trolleybus counterpart. Totally 10 "512 type" ROCAR's are known to be built, 1 bus and 9 trolleybuses
- Rocar 612U – Only one vehicle built, with Mercedes-Benz motor.
- Rocar Solaris Urbino (Rocar 712) – Romanian version of Solaris Urbino that was to be assembled by ROCAR; it is rumoured that Urbino series was going to be coded by ROCAR as 712 series. The buses were to be sent as CKD kits from Poland, and assembled by ROCAR, to be used as bus and trolleybus, but cooperation eventually failed shortly before ROCAR went bankrupt. Only one vehicle named ROCAR SOLARIS URBINO ever existed but unknown whether it was assembled by ROCAR or assembled in Poland and only badged ROCAR. It is rumored that this series was to be named 712, in ROCAR code. It never entered into series or mass production, as ROCAR went bankrupt.
- Rocar U812 – built under licence from Autodromo, of Italy. It was the only low-floor bus made by Rocar which entered in regular service. Only one was built, number in RATB #98. It was built in 1998. It was not assembled in series, probably due to low capacity, high costs and lack of interest from potential customers (public transport companies mainly). It is equipped with MAN engine D 0826 LUH 13 – 260 HP – Euro 2 found on De Simon U260, located in rear. Transmission is Voith DIWA D851.2, 3 + 1 gears, automatic. 25+82+1 places, 108 passengers in total. Still in use at RATB, along with Mercedes Citaro. Painted in red. This bus was presented at SAB (Automobile show of Bucharest) in 1998. It was also built as trolleybus.

=== Intercity buses & coaches ===
- Roman/Rocar 111/112 RD/RDT (MAN Metrobus licence) – 43+(27 for I 111)+1 seats; engine options: D 2156 HM 81 U – 192 HP (I 111 only) / D 2156 MT 85 U – 240 HP / D 2156 MTN 8 – 256 HP; mechanical gear box, 5 + 1 gears; top speed: 110 km/h
- Rocar 311 – powered by homemade and foreign-made engines – Euro 1 & 2; 43+1 seats; engine: Mercedes-Benz OM 442 A – 340 HP; mechanical gear box, 6 + 1 gears; top speed: 110 km/h

=== Trolleybuses ===
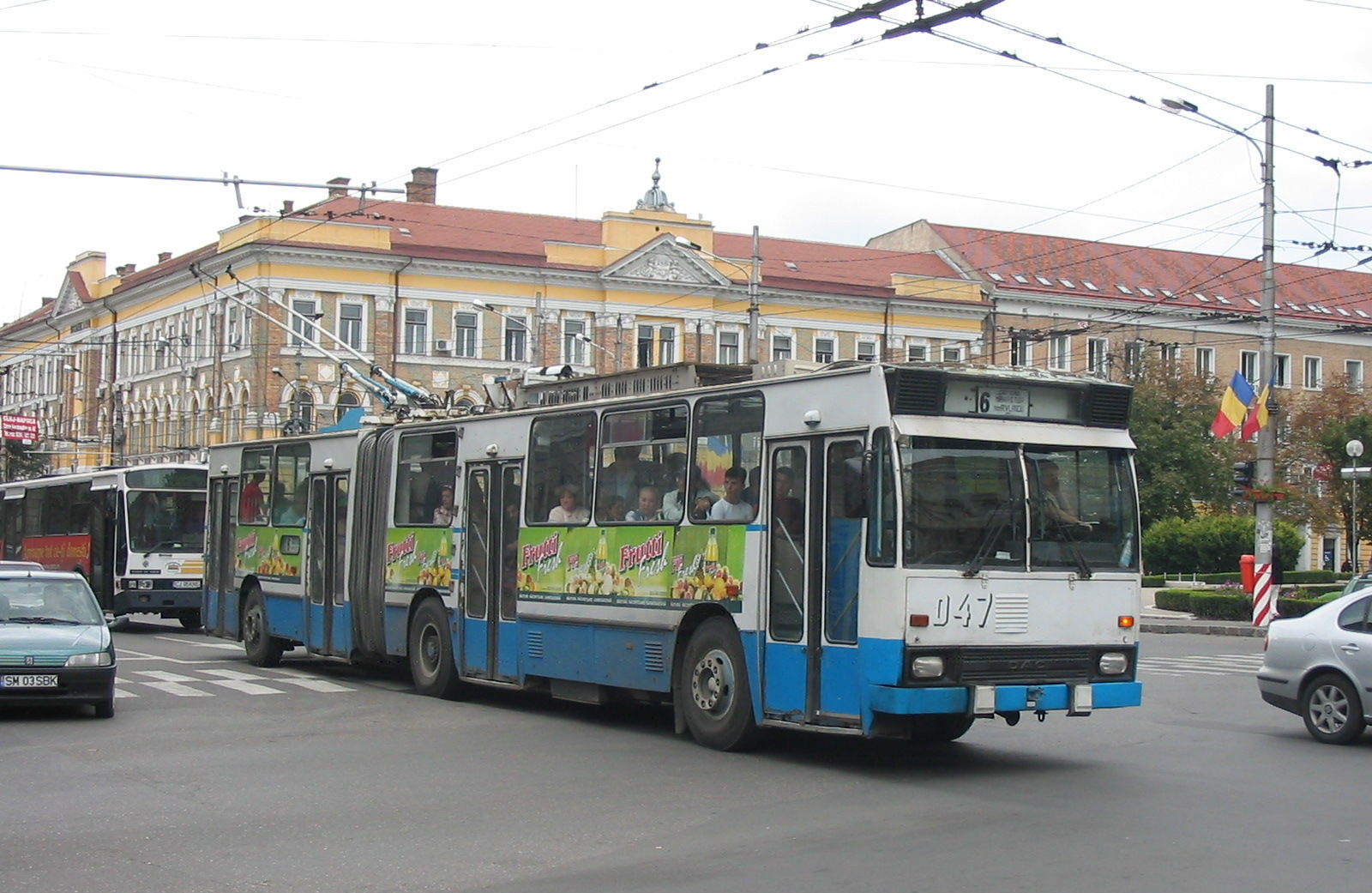
Rocar DAC 217 E trolleybus in Cluj-Napoca

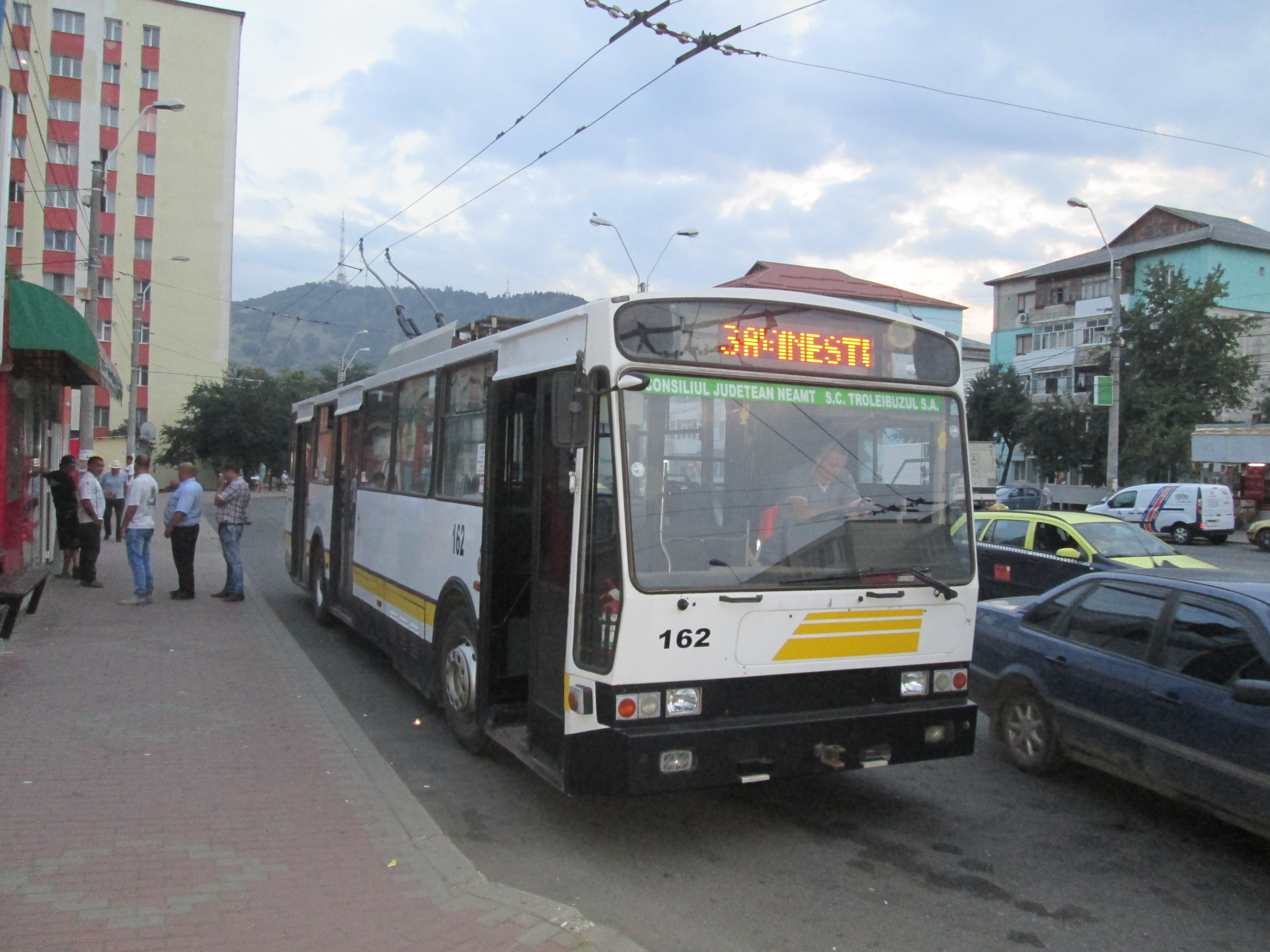
Rocar 412E trolleybus in Piatra Neamț

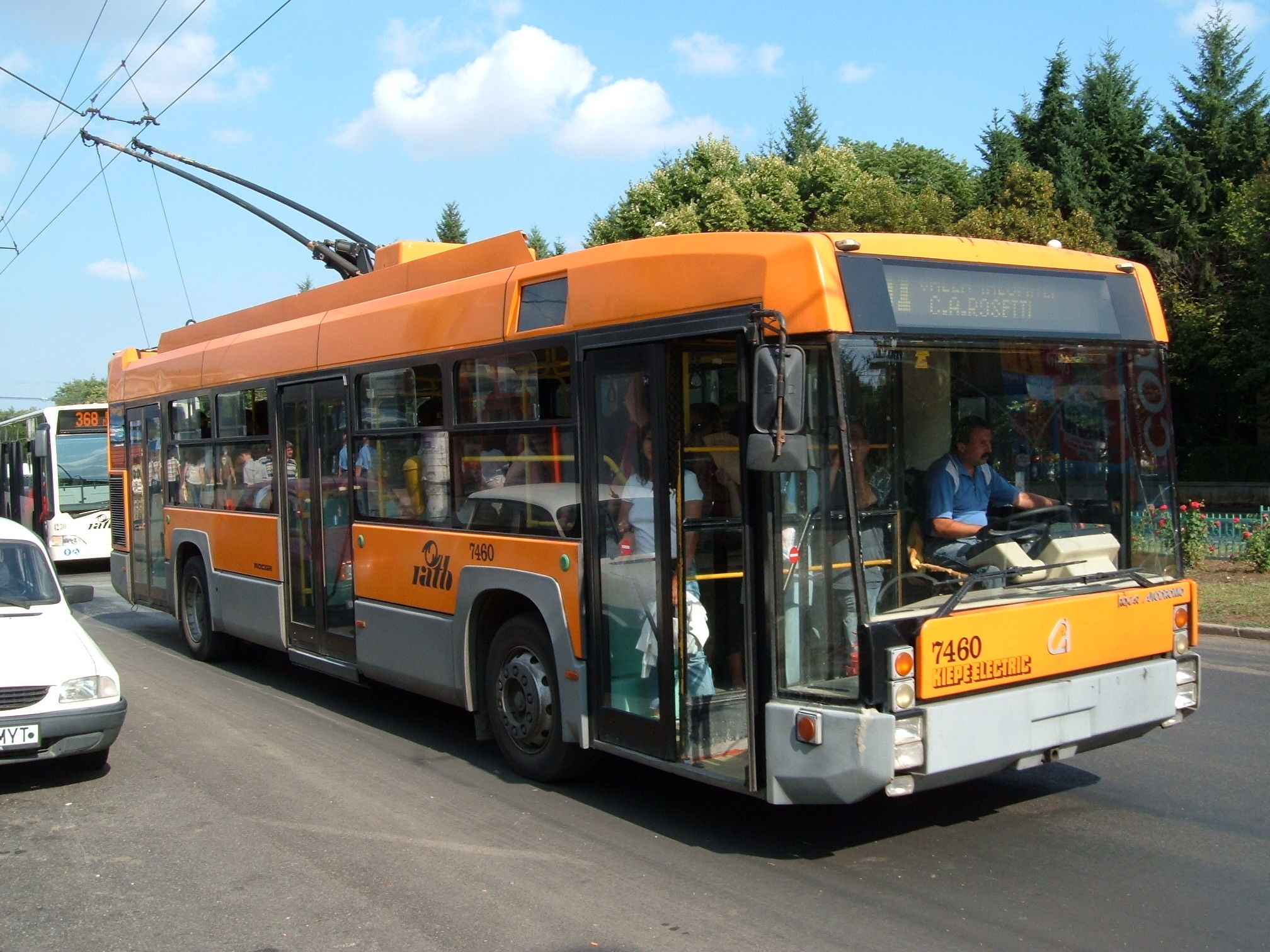
Rocar 812E low-floor trolleybus in Bucharest

- T12 (1955–58) – reconstructed version of old trolleybuses.
- T.V. 2E; T.V. 20E – Mainly the same vehicle, however different in appearance. Built between 1958 and 1968 (TV 2E) and 1968 and 1975 (TV20E). Were replaced starting in 1974 by more modern MAN based vehicles. Their technical specifications are mainly the same, but they are different in the exterior aspect. Both were 10 metres long, 87+1(T.V. 2E) passengers or 90+1(T.V. 20E) passengers capacity including the driver, 2 doors, and a 75 kW motor; top speed was 40–45 km/h. Last vehicles T.V. 20E were also built with an 85 kW motor, speed increased to 50–55 km/h. However, they were modified in some cities where they were operated in parallel with DAC 112 E ROMANIA, with 125 kW motors. It was not equipped with pneumatic suspension, it was instead equipped with leaf springs and 2 rigid axles (however it was built on a truck chassis). The compressor was working intermittently, not continuous, as it was used solely for braking and door actuating. 15 articulated versions of this trolleybus (T.V. 2E based) were also built in 1964 (presumably by URAC- ITB) and rarely operated until 1967 by ITB but withdrawn from service, probably because of some deficiencies, high costs of manufacturing and low production capacities. Named T.V. 2E-A, 15 metres long. About 120 passengers capacity. T.V. 2E and 20E were withdrawn from operation between 1975 and 1982, however in some cities, they continued to be used as service or driver school vehicles until early to mid 1980s.
- DAC 112 E ROMANIA – sometimes mistakenly called ROMAN 112E, was a trolleybus based on ROMAN 112UD body. Same technical specifications as Rocar DAC 212E. ROMAN 112 E name is used to differentiate it from classical DAC 112 E. Manufactured between 1975 and 1982. No articulated version. Operated in the past in: Constanta, Bucuresti, Brasov, Cluj, Timișoara, Cities with trolleybus system before 1980. They were withdrawn from service in the late 1980s and during 1990s. Built with TN76 125 kW motor, but also with a lower power version of this motor, producing 110 kW, probably economical versions.
- DAC 112 E – Trolleybus version of DAC 112 bus; Different body from DAC 112 E ROMANIA. Same specifications as DAC 212, however, DAC 112E was one of the first models, usually low height. It was available both with TN76 125 kW and TN81 150 kW motor, but also a 110 kW economical version was available. Pneumatic suspension. DAC 112 E were built in fewer exemplars than DAC 117 E which had a higher demand. Some 117E were transformed in 112 E. Some of these busses were having a contact and relays big box behind the driver, but these models were rare, however causing crowding between passengers. Top speed: 60 km/h. As a result of the harsh economy in the period it was manufactured, some of these models were not fitted with power steering, although originally designed to have power steering. Some of them were retrofitted with power steering after 1990.
- DAC 117 E/EA – Articulated, 17 m version of DAC 112E. First models were equipped with TN76 125 kW motor, but also TN81 150 kW versions existed. No 110 kW motor fitted. Many of them were low height. 36+112+1 passengers. Pneumatic suspension Some of them were later fitted with electronic choppers. Some of them were fitted with 180 KW motors, but these were modified at the owning garage, the motor being imported. Slightly lower number of passengers, because many of these vehicles were having a big contacts and relays box inside the saloon behind the driver. This is one of the particularities of DAC 117 which makes it easy identifiable. However, this big contact and relays box was also specific to some DAC 217, but to a lower extent. Top speed: 55–60 km/h. As a result of the harsh economy in the period it was manufactured, some of these models were not fitted with power steering, although originally designed to have power steering. Some of them were retrofitted with power steering after 1990.
- DAC 122E or 123E – Double-articulated trolleybus based on DAC 117E. It could transport more than 170 passengers. To be mentioned that this vehicle was built by URAC RATB ITB, not by ROCAR (ex Autobuzul)! It was built by adding another section between the first and the last section of the vehicle. It was a prototype, but was operated by ITB (later RATB) under the number #7091. However, take into account that the name DAC 122 or 123E is not official, it is simply derived from DAC 117 ( 17 metres versions) and DAC 122/123 was 22 or 23 metres long ! It was built in the early 1980s and operated until late 1990s even early 2000s. Only one was built although some more were to be built, but the project was abandoned due to the multitude of disadvantages of this vehicle (difficult to be driven, low power of the motor – the TN76 125 kW from early 117E, low speed) and higher costs, its only main advantages being high number of passengers to be transported.
- 212E – (single trolleybus with logical control unit) – 28+64+1 passengers; motor: TN 76 – 125 kW; top speed: 60 km/h. Versions with TN81 150 kW motor also existed.
- 217E – (articulated trolleybus) – 39+117+1 passengers; motor: TN 81 – 150 kW; top speed: 60 km/h. Similar in appearance with DAC 117, but it was taller. Also available with chopper.
- 312E – single trolleybus with chopper); 26+69+1 passengers; motor: TN 76 – 125 kW; top speed: 60 km/h. Used in: Cluj, Iasi (1 vehicle numbered 512), Bucharest (2 vehicles 7447 and 7448), Timișoara.
- Rocar 317EC – It is not the articulated version of ROCAR 312 E as many will suppose, it is in fact very similar in appearance with DAC 117E and 217E, but it is a taller model like 217. It is equipped with 150 kW engine TN96 and, usually, chopper and thyristors. Has the same number of passengers as 117 and 217. Many went to export, however, a few were used in Romania. Built after 1990 usually. Top speed: 60 km/h. It can be identified as having a slightly thicker second pillar on the left side near by the driver on the saloon side and the second thicker pillar after the articulation.
- DAC 318ET – A trolleybus with 2 motors TN 76 – 125 kW and 2 motor axles, one behind and one in the front of the articulation. Only built as prototype. 18 metres long, 200 passengers. Top speed 60 km/h.
- 412E (single trolleybus with chopper, traction motor located in overhang) – 25+68+1 passengers; motor: TN 96R – 150 kW; top speed: 60 km/h. Also available with AC traction system, with a three phase 155 KW motor, only one built. Used in: Bucharest (7454 and 7459 with AC traction system), Constanta (15 vehicles), Cluj (2 vehicles), Piatra Neamt (brought from Constanta 5 vehicles). Models from Constanta were in fact equipped with rheostatic controller and adapted for 825 V operation.
- 512E – single trolleybus with chopper, traction motor located in overhang; 20+68+1 passengers; motor: TN 76 – 125 kW; top speed: 60 km/h. Used only in Bucharest. Not any more in use. Numbered 7449-7453 and 7455-7458. Only 9 vehicles built. There was also a single U512 Bus.
- Rocar 812E – Low-floor trolleybus, made in 1998. It was the only low-floor trolleybus from Rocar to enter in regular service. It belongs to RATB and it is numbered #7460. Like U812, its bus counterpart, it was made under Autodromo licence. Among its particularities were AC traction, with alternating current motor, frequency converter-inverter. The electronic traction equipment was made by KIEPE ELECTRIC. The entire vehicle is assembled by Rocar. 155 KW alternating current, three-phase motor, top speed 58 km/h. Same specifications as U812 regarding passengers number. Was painted in orange.

=== Light commercial vehicles and minibuses ===
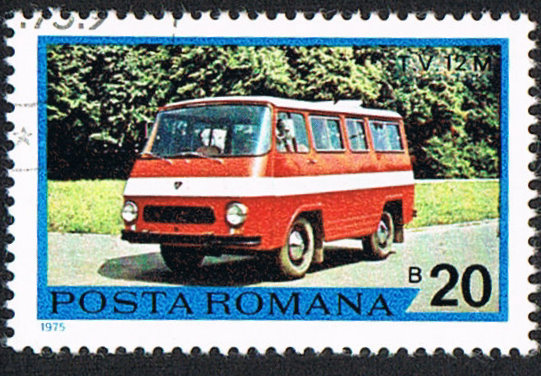
Stamp with T.V. 12 M

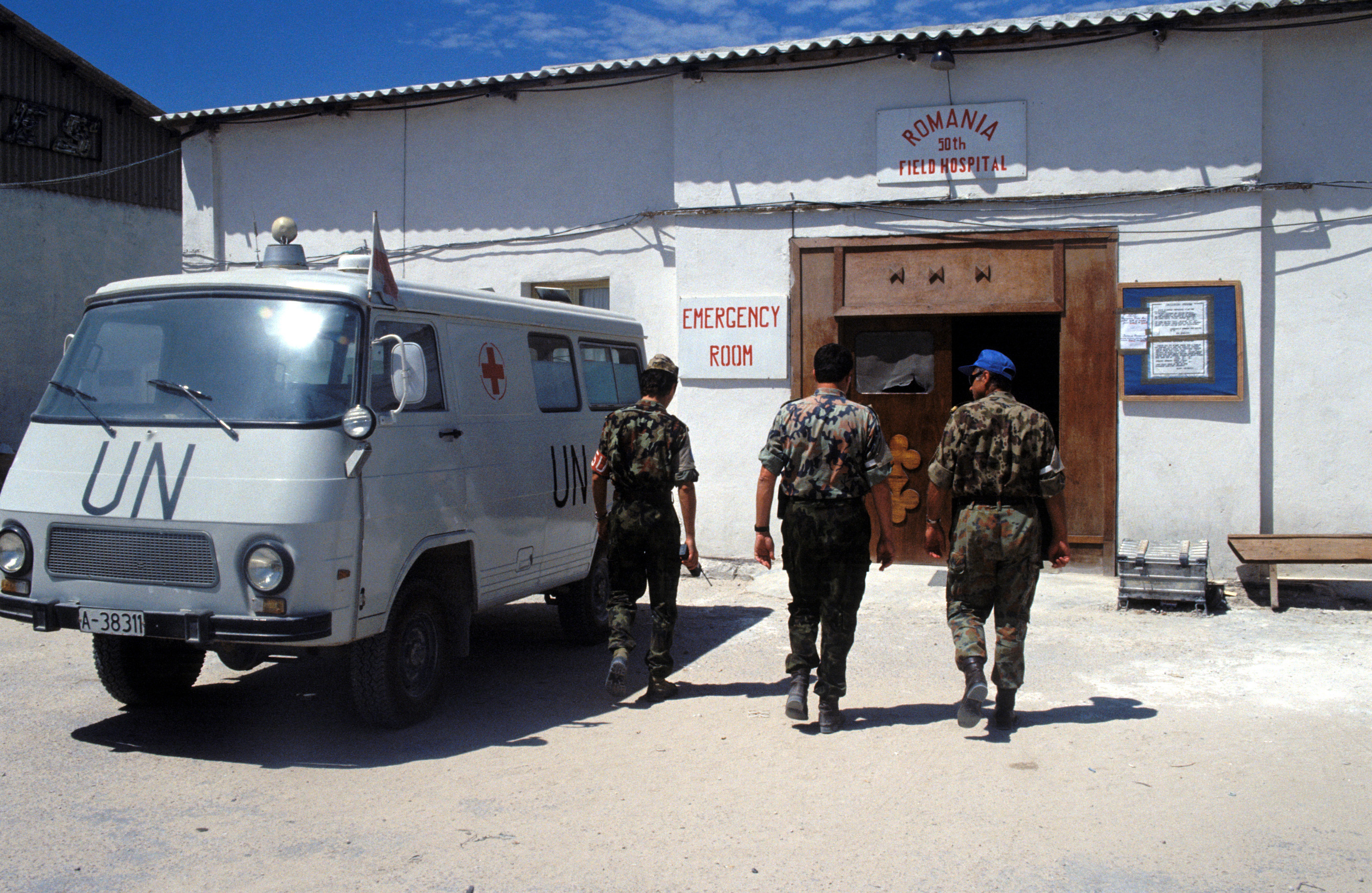
T.V. 12 S ambulance in front of the United Nations field hospital in Mogadishu, 1993

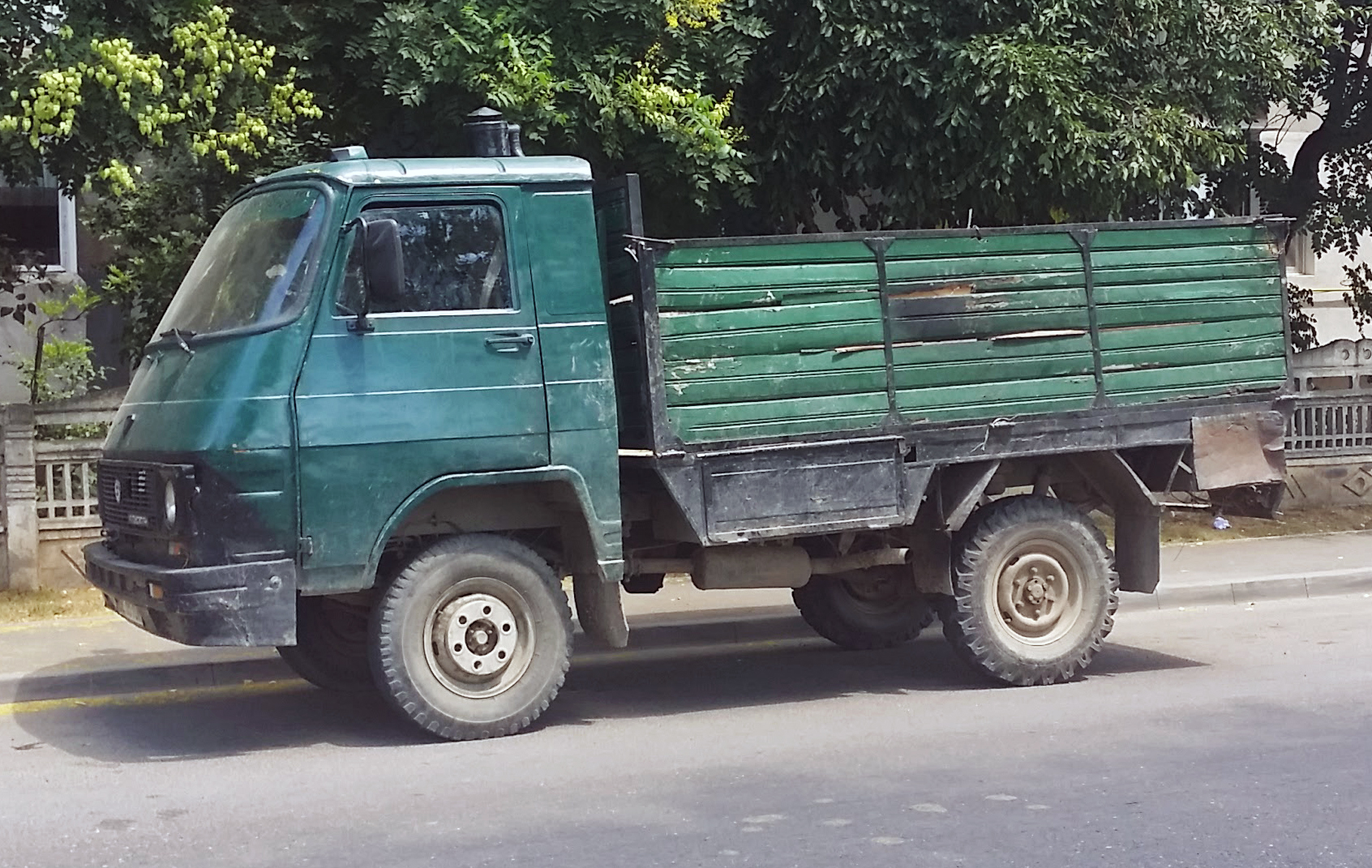
ROCAR 40 C truck

- T.V. 33 – F-vans / M-minibuses / C-pick-ups / A-chassis / FA-workshop vans / S-ambulances; up to 14+1 seats (for minibuses); g.v.w.: 3350 kg / payload: 1200–1400 kg; engine options: ARO D 127 – 68 HP – Diesel / ARO L 25 – 83 HP – gasoline; mechanical gear box, 4 or 5 + 1 gears; traction options: 4 x 2 and 4 x 4; top speed: 100 km/h
- T.V. 40 – F-vans / M-minibus / C-pick-ups / A-chassis / I- frigorific vehicles / CD-double cab pick-ups; up to 14+1 seats (for minibuses); g.v.w.: 4000 kg / payload: 1200–1800 kg; engine options: ARO D 127 – 68 HP – Diesel / ANDORIA – 90 HP – Diesel – Euro 2; Renault – 106 HP – Diesel – Euro 2; mechanical gear box, 4 or 5 + 1 gears; rear axle with twin wheels; top speed: 110 km/h

Other models:

- T.V. 4/41 (M, F, C, S) – the TV-4 was launched in 1959, based on an IMS chassis, and bodied as a panel van, minibus and ambulance. Later on, a tipper was also manufactured, for use by the Bucharest taxi service. In 1962 the TV-4 was comprehensively restyled, using a modern, more angular bodywork. Special versions were made for milk delivery and - as prototypes - as seaside transport. No TV-4s of either kind are known to survive.
- T.V. 41 (M, F, C, S) The TV-4's further restyling in 1967 was launched under the model name of TV41. Like the TV-4 before it, it was built on IMS M461 platform, and had a separate chassis. It was available in 4x2 (and 4x4 configuration as TV51), both in pickup(C) truck and van(F). It was also available as a minibus with 9 seats (M). It was powered by a M207 70 hp engine from IMS M461. Top speed: 95 km/h, 4+1 step gearbox. Later, many of these models were fitted with a 3 cylinders U445 tractor engine, 45 hp, top speed was about 70–75 km/h, or sometimes with ARO diesel engines, D127 and D27. These models were never built with diesel engines, they were retrofitted in the mid 1970s after the oil crisis. S was the ambulance version, with modified suspension.
- T.V. 5/51/52 (M, F, C, S) – Mainly the same with TV4/41, but were equipped with 4WD, 4x4, and higher ground clearance.
- T.V. 12 (M, F, C, S) – The successor of TV41 and 51 series. Built on a monocoque body, with the separate chassis design being abandoned. T.V. was an early adopter of this solution, when the TV 12 appeared in 1973. Available as a van (F), pickup (C), and Minibus (M). First models were available only with the ARO L25 petrol engine, but later were produced with diesel engines, mainly ARO D127 and D27. Four-speed manual transmissions. Payload was 1200 kg, top speed 100 km/h in all versions. Towable weight was about 1000 kg. Also available with 4x4 drivetrain, thanks to its ARO roots. Suspension, both front and rear was rigid axle and leaf springs. The model S was the ambulance version, which had a modified suspension and a higher top speed due to modified gearbox. In export markets, these were also offered with the popular Peugeot (Indenor) 2.1-litre diesel engine. In the United Kingdom the T.V. 12 was sold as the "Tudor Panel Van." Between 1978 and 1982 this same vehicle was also manufactured in Portugal in small numbers by the SEMAL company in Lisbon, sold under the brandname of TAGUS GV250 Diesel 4X4 Series a LUV model but also produced the earlier and more successful PORTARO 4X4 Offroad Series since 1976 until the early 1990s. Both of them are powered by original Daihatsu Diesel running gear although were entirely developed in Romania. In the UK they were available by a firm called TVI Tudor Vehicle Imports UK Limited based at Glossop in Derbyshire who imported both ARO 4X4 models and ROCAR TV models sold locally as the TUDOR TV Rocar 4WD Series in 10 different optional versions all powered by original ARO 4X4 2500 petrol mechanicals or else using Peugeot 2100 Diesel engines already fitted with RHD for the British automobile market since 1979.
- T.V. 14/15 (M, F, C, S) – Mainly the same specifications with TV 12 series, but payload increased to 1400 respectively 1500 kg. Built after 1982 until late 1990s. Also available with 24V electrical system. Equipped with ARO D27 and D127 engines. Also available with Andoria engines after 1990. On these models, 5+1 gears gearbox was optional. Top Speed between 100 and 110 km/h, depending on the transmission and engine. Power steering was also optional.
- T.V. 35 – Was built since early 1980s until late 1990s. It was available in truck version, van version, and 22 passengers minibus, which was used in public transport on lower demand routes, but also by factories and institutes for employees transport. It can be easily recognized by rear axle with twin wheels, it is longer than TV 12/14/15 series, has lower ground clearance. It was available both with 12 and 24 V electrical system. It was equipped with ARO D127 engine, but with increased power, 85 HP. Top speed was 100–110 km/h (depending on engine and transmission). Available with 4+1 and 5+1 gears gearbox. It was also available with Andoria or Renault diesel engines.
- ARO 320 – Aro 320 was built by ROCAR until 2002, and until 2004 by ARO. It was manufactured by Rocar because ARO reached its maximum production capacity. It was introduced in late 1975, and based on a lengthened chassis of ARO 24 series. It was available with all engines that were available on ARO 24, and it supported all modifications of ARO 24. Its payload was 1200–1500 kg, mainly available with 4WD, but versions only with rear wheel drive were also available. It was designed to carry a load of a T.V. on terrain were only ARO could reach. Top speed was 105–110 km/h depending on the engine. It was offered with 4+1 and 5+1 gears gearbox. Towable weight: between 1500 and 2300 kg. The chassis was polyvalent, meaning it could be used for other upper structures like lorry truck, tanker truck, Truck with self-loading crane, car transport platforms. It was also available in twin wheels rear axle. It was also called T.V. 320C.
- TV 320 series – Was a series of off-road vehicles manufactured in low numbers, based on modified ARO 24 chassis. They were mainly designed for person transportation on off-road. Also manufactured as ambulance, school-bus-type vehicles, van, minibus or protocol vehicles, with up to 9-10 passengers. Because they were being based and derived from ARO 24 and 32 series, they suffered the same modifications, and had the same engines. Manufactured in very low numbers, usually on special demand. Very few sold to particulars, some of them were also exported.
- T.V. 105
- T.V. 106 – Also called ROCAR 106. It is a minibus of 6,5–7 metres long, 18+1 seats, and powered by an ARO D127 engine, with power increased to 115 HP. Mainly designed for public transport on lower demand lines where a bus was not efficient. Also used as school bus in some counties of Romania.
- T.V. 206/207 – A minibus, 7 metres long, 24+1 seats, powered by a D797-05 diesel engine or IVECO 8141 SI Turbo-Diesel. Top speed 115 km/h. One of the last models manufactured by ROCAR before the company went bankrupt.

ROCAR light commercial vehicles have largely been withdrawn from service and replaced with newer and more modern vehicles. Spare parts for ROCAR vehicles became scarce after the bankruptcy of ROCAR, and the running costs became higher.

== See also ==
- Rocar DAC
- Rocar De Simon U412
- Rocar De Simon U412-DAF
- Rocar De Simon U412E
