= Rocar DAC =

Series of Romanian buses, manufacturered by Rocar

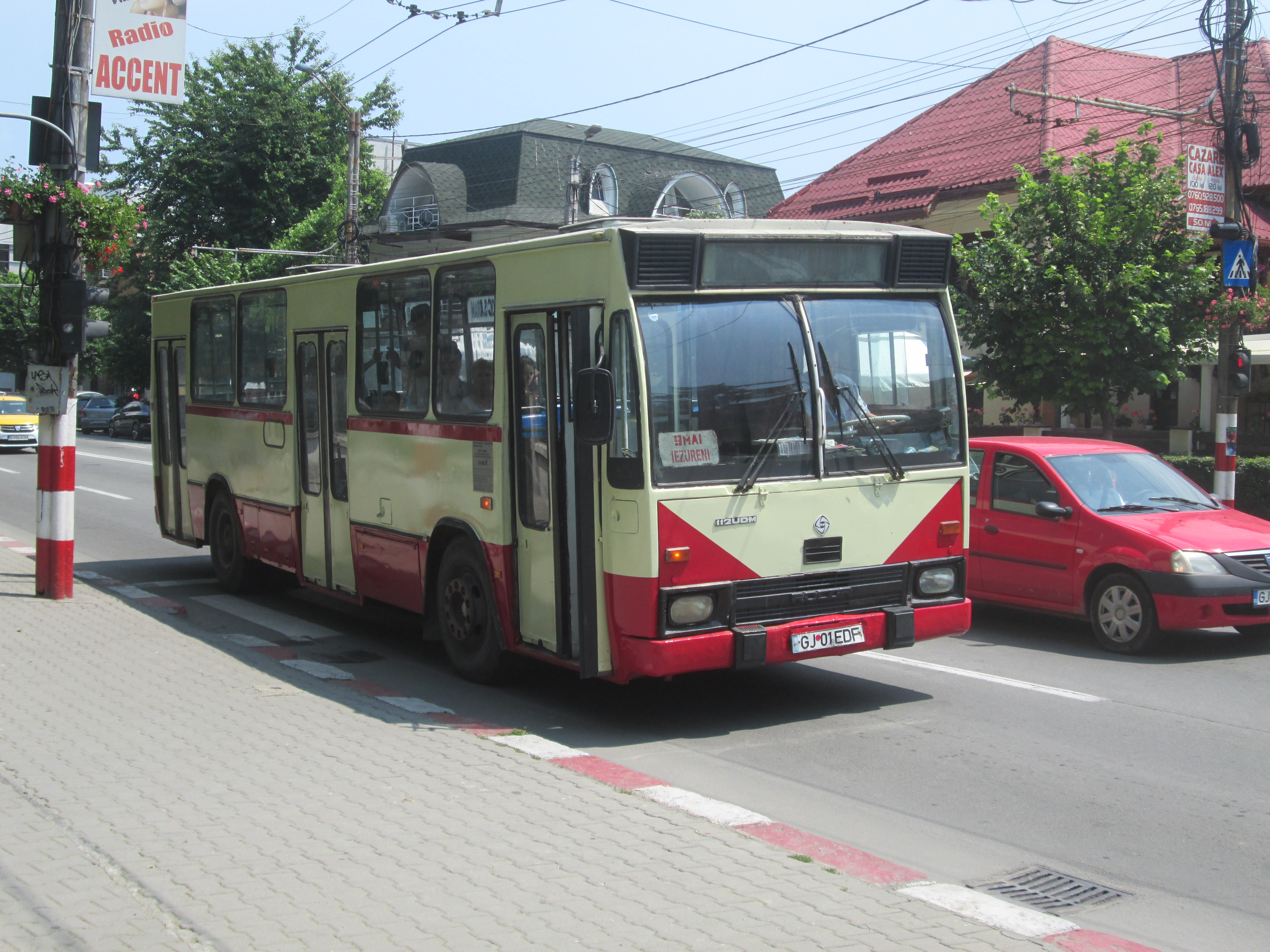
- Rocar DAC 112 UDM in Târgu Jiu, 15 June 2019. As of 2021, only one city in Romania still operates the elderly bus type: Târgu Jiu.

Overview
- Manufacturer: ROCAR
- Production: 1978-2000

Body and chassis
- Doors: 1, 2, and 3
- Floor type: step entrance
- Chassis: 12 m rigid or 17 m articulated

Powertrain
- Engine: Rába D2156 HMU 192 hp, or 240 hp in turbo charged version
- Power output: 192 hp aspirated, 240 hp turbocharged
- Transmission: 4 or 6 steps gearbox

Dimensions
- Length: 12 m rigid, 17 m articulated

Chronology
- Predecessor: Roman 112 UD
- Successor: Rocar De Simon

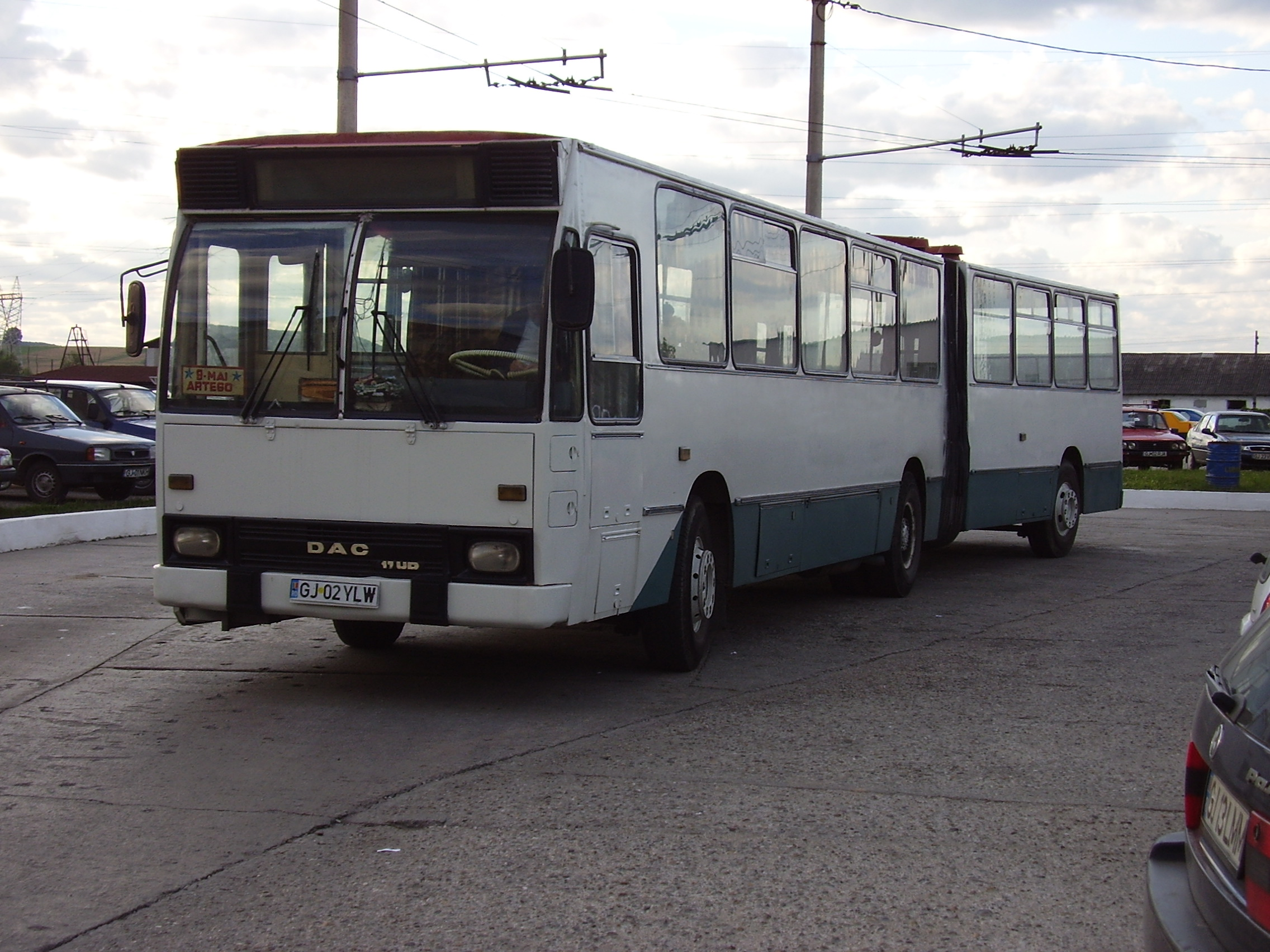
Rocar 117UD bus in Târgu Jiu, built in 1996

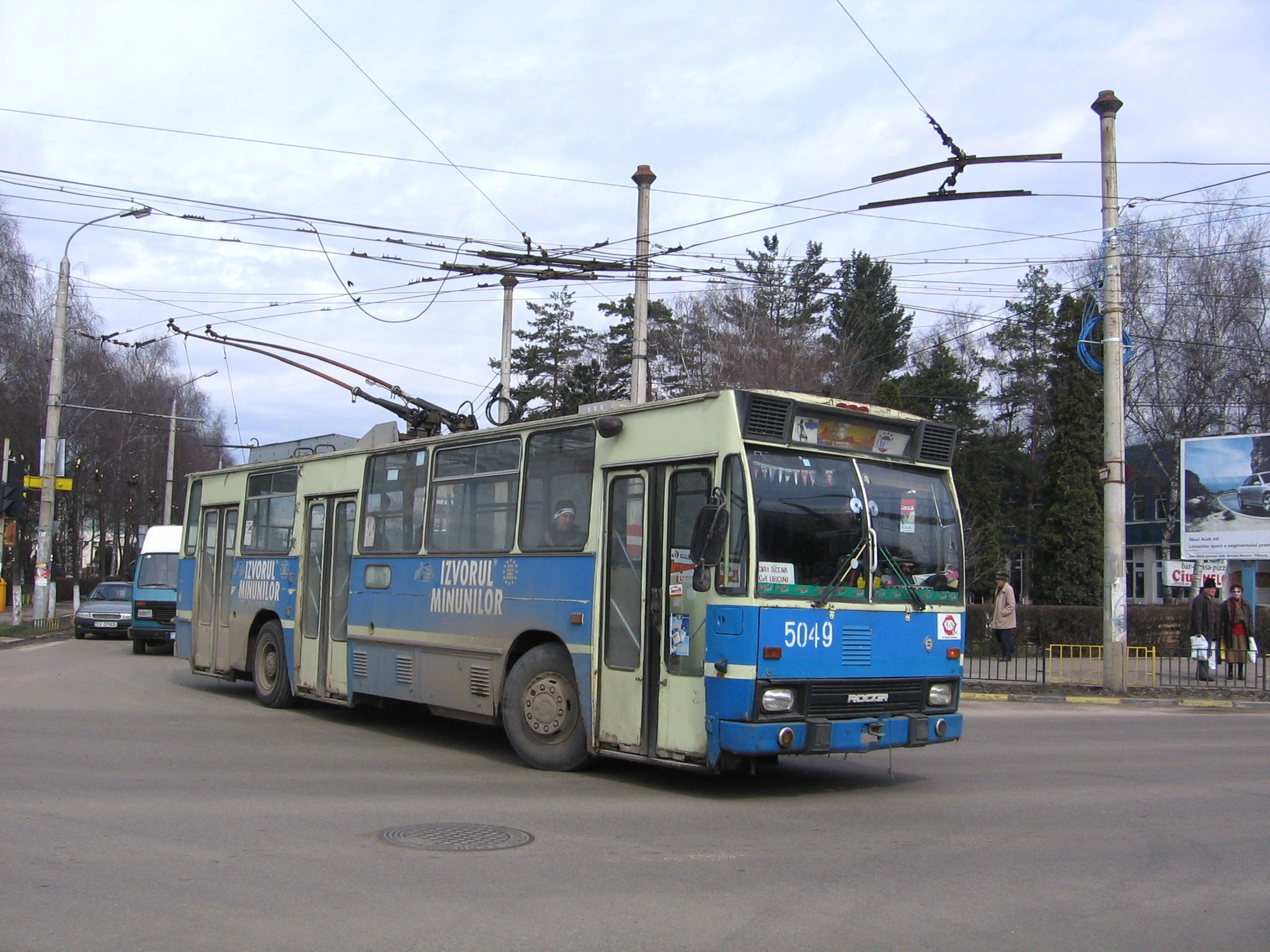
A Rocar 212E trolleybus in Suceava

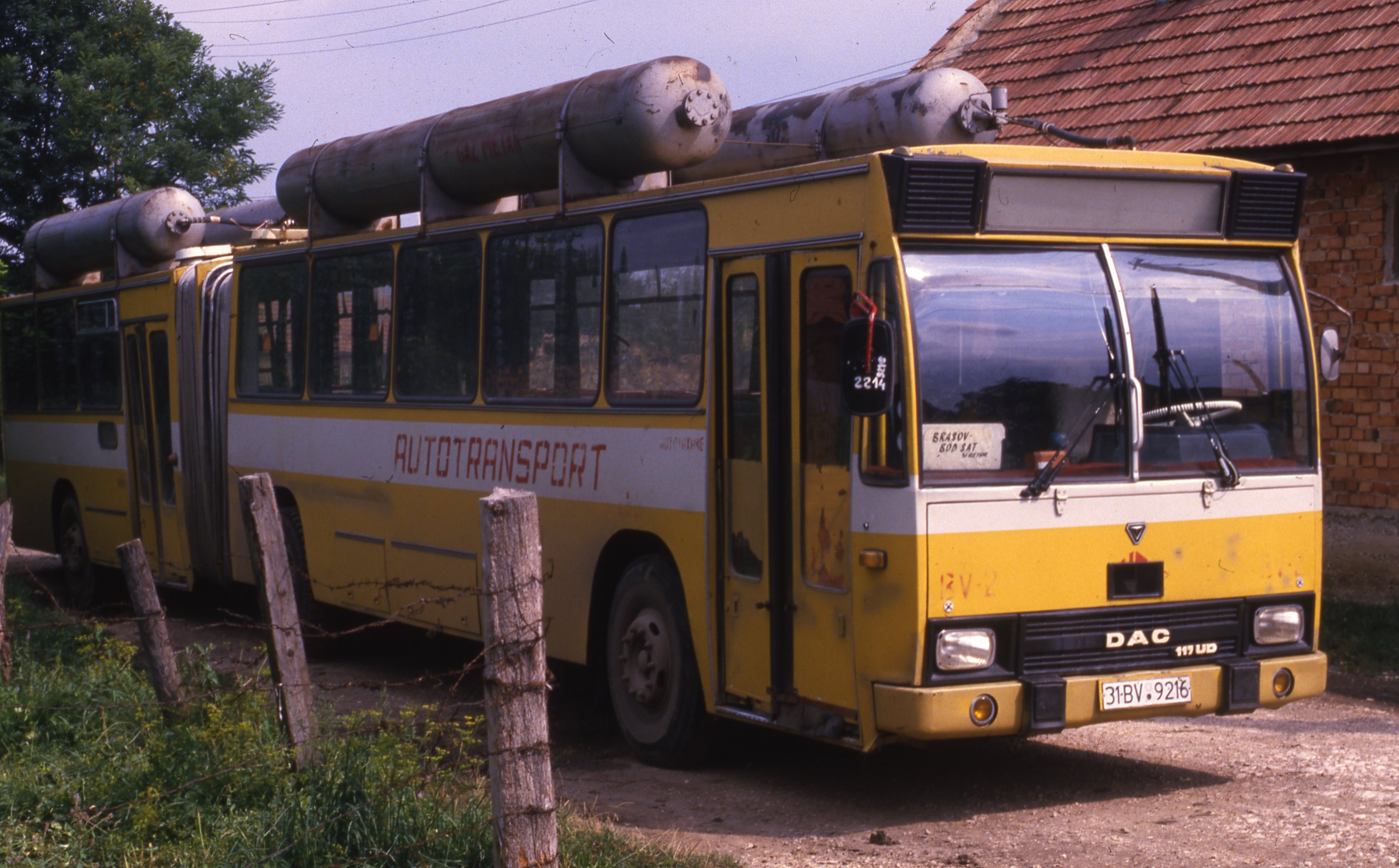
DAC 117 UD (interurban variant) with methane gas tanks that were typical of 1986 in Romania

Rocar DAC was a series of buses and trolleybuses produced by the Autobuzul (later Rocar) company of Bucharest, Romania, between 1979 and 2000. They were available in both standard 12-meter models and articulated, 17-meter models. The first examples to enter service were DAC 117UDs that were made towards the end of 1978 and entered service with the ITB in Bucharest in April 1979.

For much of the 1980s and early 1990s, these buses and trolleybuses were the backbone of the urban transportation network of Romania since, throughout the 1980s, public transportation companies were not allowed to import any type of vehicle.

The buses were designed and built in a period of severe shortages, the main emphasis being put on economizing material usage and simplicity of the design. Most buses of this type did not have power or assisted steering, and only a small number of buses, built in the early part of the project (1979-1982) employed automatic gearboxes, which were abandoned as solution due to high costs. The passenger area was also very spartan, having no interior sound or display systems, seats being built out of plywood, only later models were fitted with plastic seats, light fixtures being 6-8 small 12-volt light bulbs providing insufficient lighting.

During the late 1980s, some were converted to run on methane gas, by installing two or three gas tanks on the roofs. After the fall of the communist regime, the buses were converted back to diesel. DAC buses were equipped with Hungarian RABA-MAN engines, or with Romanian IABv engines capable of 192 horse power DIN and a 4 or 6 gears gear box for a maximum speed of 65 km/h. After 1990 the series was slightly improved as quality level, like RABA engines, RABA transmission, plastic seats (or sometimes with vinyl upholstery cushions - mainly coach versions, but also some urban versions), and many models were taller. Some of them, were even fitted with fluorescent lighting, but in very few cases, this retrofitting was mainly made at the host garage. Some models were fitted after the 1990s with less polluting motors, and this thing was specified on the bus.

In 1996, Rocar began replacing the model line-up with the new Rocar De Simon range that was produced until the bankruptcy of the company in 2003 (however, Dac 112 UDM buses were built until 2000). Most Rocar DAC buses have been withdrawn from service, and replaced with more modern buses. RATB still uses them as utility or service vehicles (the last examples being withdrawn in 2007), but not any more as passenger vehicles. However, some survived with smaller transport companies, on some rural services and in small towns.

Trolleybuses, on the other hand, have fared better, because of the higher purchasing cost and durability, and are still a common site in cities such as Cluj (withdrawn in 2016), Targu-Jiu or Kyiv (withdrawn in the mid 2000s), however there are plans to replace them with newer vehicles. In some cases trolleybuses exceeded 25–30 years of service. Târgu Jiu's last Rocar DAC trolleybuses, which had operated since the network was opened in 1995, were finally withdrawn from service in December 2021, after new Solaris Trollinos arrived to replace them.

It was also exported, only as trolleybus version, in Bulgaria (used in Varna, Burgas, Sofia) and Ukraine (Kyiv, Kharkiv, Dnipro), however they were modified and fitted locally with other motors and controllers than in its mother country. Also sent as test vehicles in former Yugoslavia, Czechoslovakia and Hungary, but were not accepted (probably mainly due to the fact that these countries were also having their bus manufacturers - IKARBUS, Škoda and Ikarus respectively).

== Models ==
=== Buses ===
- DAC 112 UDM - the standard 12-meter model, used for urban or suburban routes. This was the base model for all later designs, available with two or three doors; built between 1982 and 2000.
- DAC 117 UD - the articulated, 17-meter model, available with two or four doors; built between 1979 and 1998
- DAC UDAN 2002 - an attempt at modernizing the DAC 112 UDM by replacing the engine and transmission of the DAC 112 UDM with a Euro 2 compliant model, as well as modernizing the bodywork. Only two were built before the project was deemed unsuccessful. Both were operated by RATB.

=== Trolleybuses ===
- DAC 112 E - Standard trolleybus, powered by one 110 or 125 kW direct current motor
- DAC 212 E - Standard trolleybus, powered by one TN76 125 kW direct current motor. Outfitted with an electronic command system for its contactors. Also available with 150 kW motor (TN81 type)
- DAC 212 ECS - Same as DAC 212 E, but using a chopper system as a speed control. ECS stands for Electric Chopper System. Fitted with 125 or 150 kW motor (TN76 or TN81)
- DAC 117 E(A) - Articulated trolleybus, powered by one 125 kW direct current motor. Although some operators called these vehicles DAC 117 EA (with A form 'articulated'; some also called the articulated buses 'DAC 117 UDA'), all the VIN plates of these vehicles shows the correct name (without the 'A'). Also available with TN81 150 KW motor. Some models were produced with choppers.
- DAC 217 E - Articulated trolleybus, powered by one 150 kW direct current motor. The most common model, with electronic command of the contactors. Also available with chopper, as an option.
- DAC 317 ETS - Same with DAC 217 E, but with the motor controlled by thyristors. ETS stands for Electric Thyristor System. Equipped with TN81 150 kW motor or with the newer TN96 150 kW motor.
- DAC 318 ET Tandem - Articulated trolleybus, powered by two DC motors TN76 125 kW, working in tandem. Only one prototype was built. 18 meters long, up to 200 passengers.
- DAC 122E or 123E - Double articulated trolleybus, powered by one TN76 125 kW motor at axle number two. It was made by URAC ITB in cooperation with ROCAR. It could transport almost 200 passengers or even more. It was numbered #7091 at ITB/RATB. It was made in the 1980s and was used until early to mid 2000. It is rumored that two more such vehicles existed, but they were transformed back to 117E due to high costs and some disadvantages, also present at #7091: Difficult driving, slow, underpowered, only advantage being the high number of passengers. It was scrapped somewhere in June 2000. It is also rumored that a double articulated DAC bus existed, but nothing is confirmed, as this type was nowhere operated, except for the double articulated trolleybus which was operated by ITB later RATB.

== See also ==
- DAC (vehicle manufacturer)
- List of buses
