= De Simon =

Italian bus manufacturer and coachbuilder

De Simon Group S.p.A.
- Company type: Joint-stock company
- Industry: Bus manufacturing
- Founded: 1925, 2006 as S.p.A.
- Headquarters: Osoppo, Udine, Italy
- Products: Buses, Spare parts
- Website: http://www.desimon.it

De Simon Group S.p.A. is a bus manufacturer and coachbuilder based in Osoppo, Udine, Italy.

== History ==
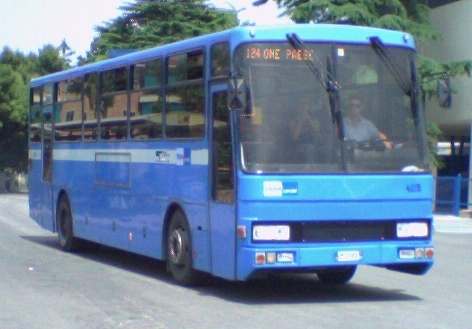
Inbus De Simon I330 touristic bus

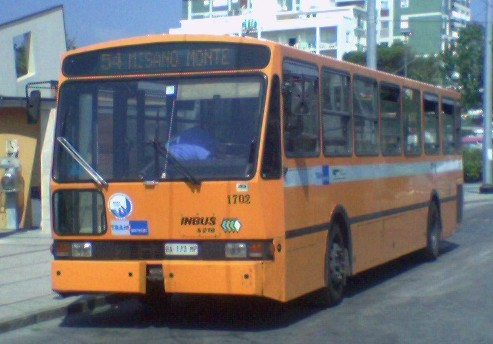
Inbus U210 urban bus

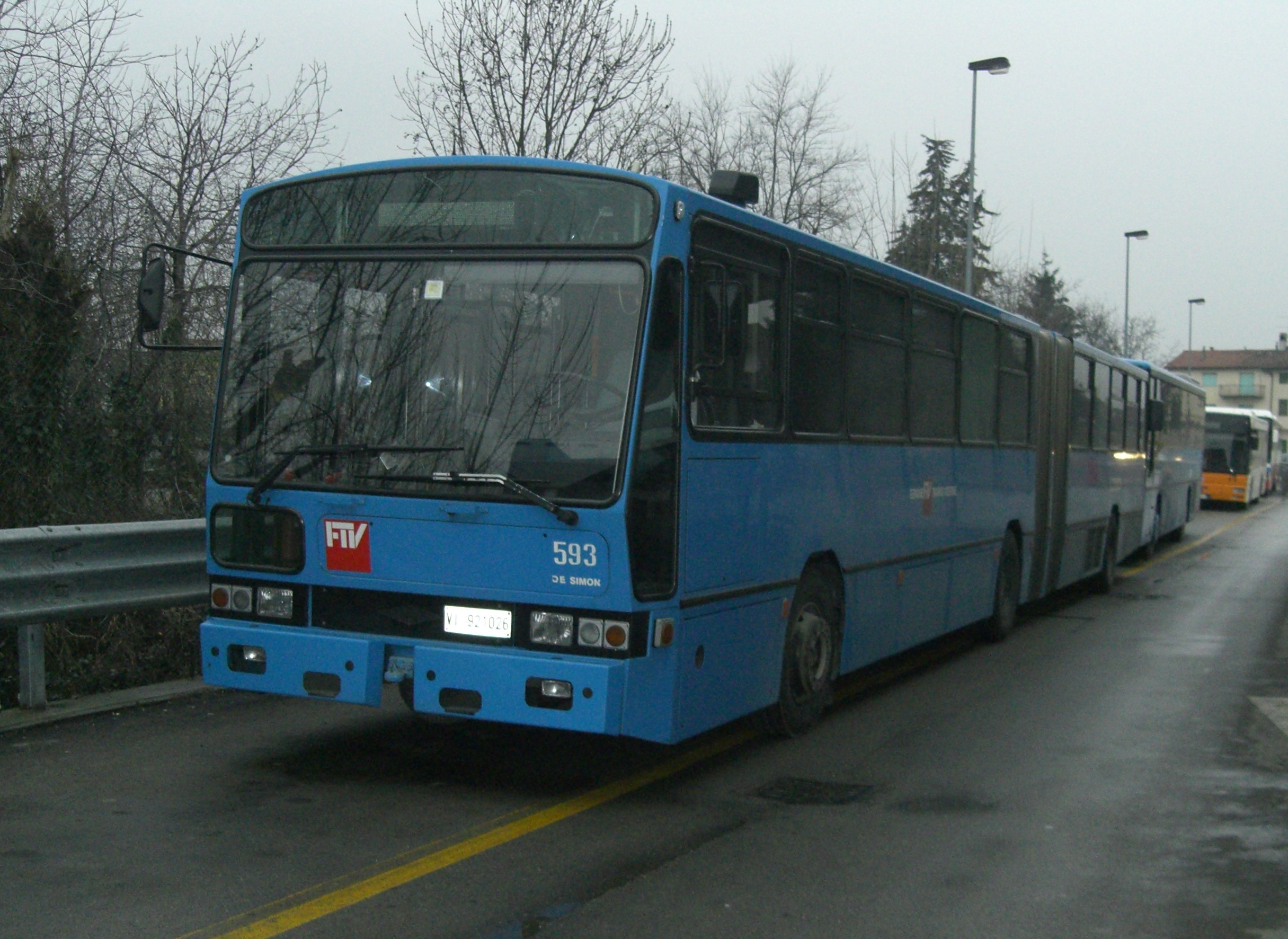
Inbus AID 280 FT articulated bus

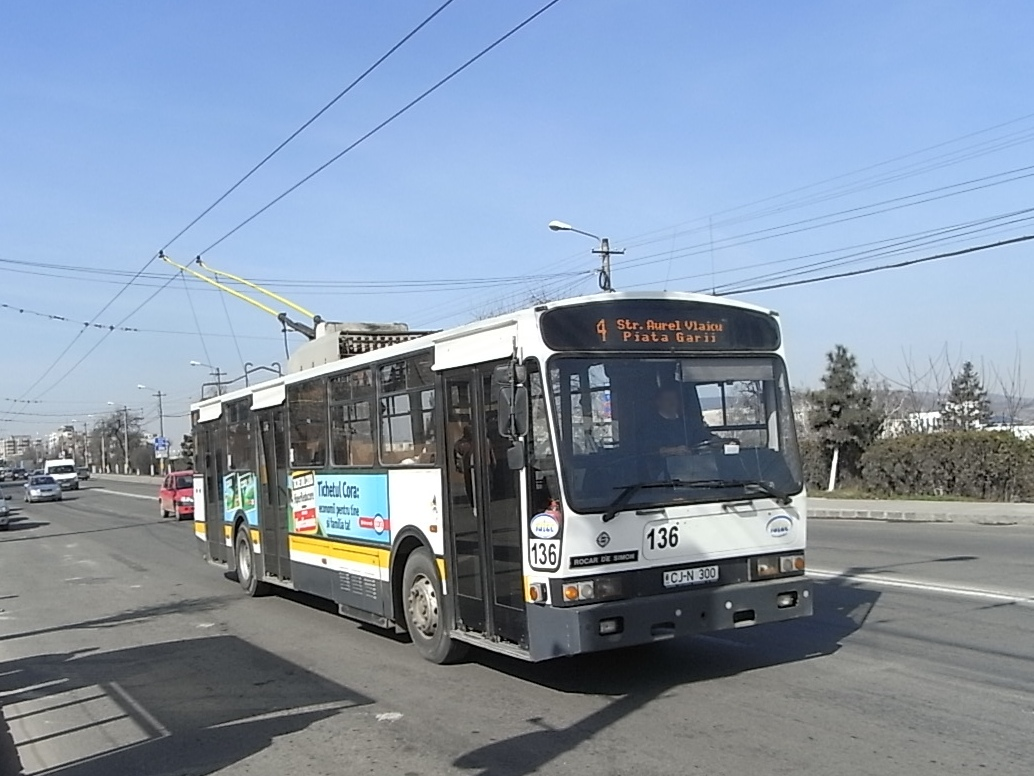
Rocar De Simon trolleybus in Cluj Napoca

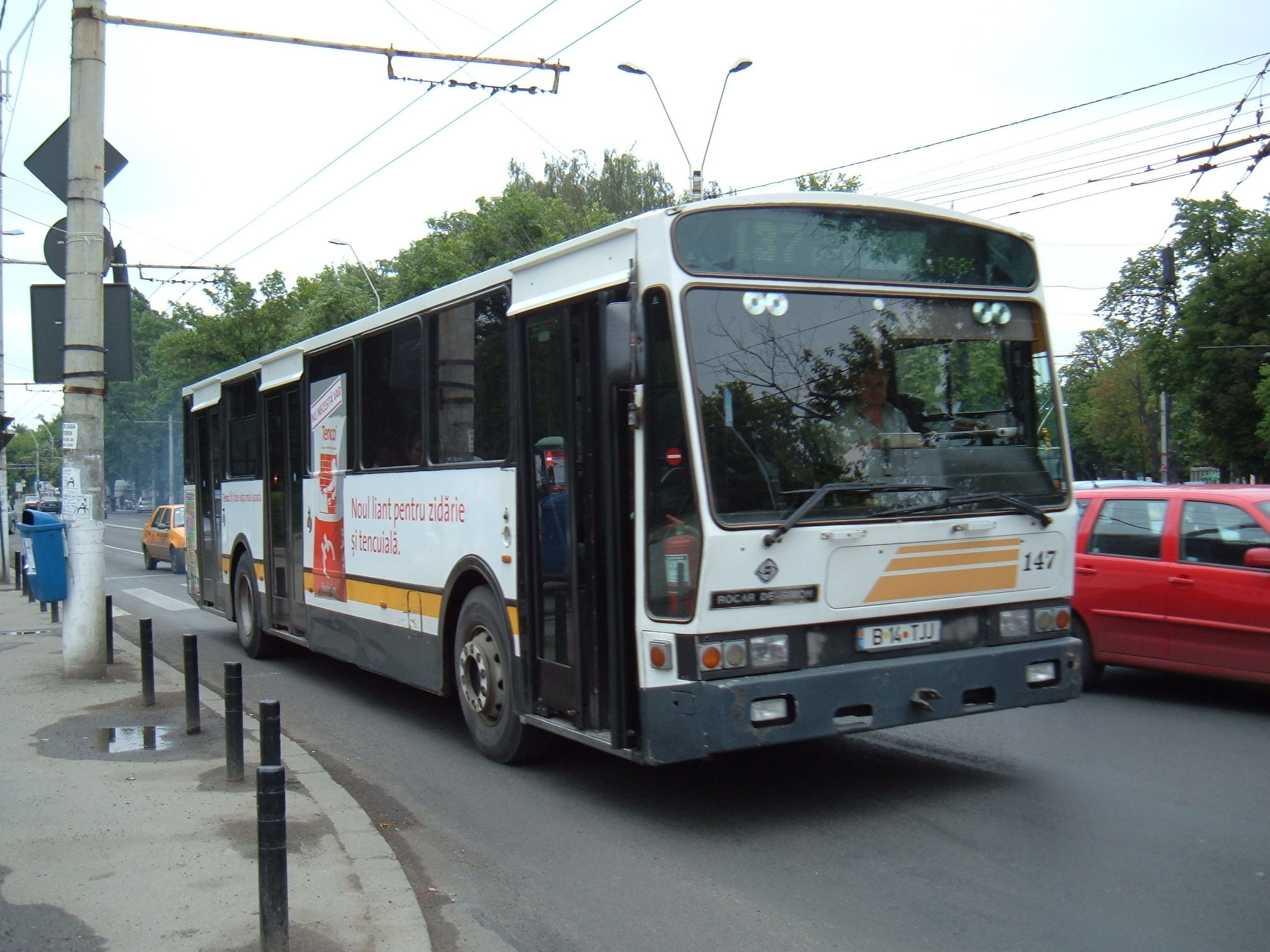
Rocar De Simon urban bus in Bucharest

The company was founded in 1925 by Giovanni De Simon, who started assembling wooden-body buses for the local public transport. Later, under the management of his son Ilvo, the company introduced steel for interurban and touristic coaches, using Fiat, OM, Lancia or Alfa chassis.

In the sixties they started assembling buses on Fiat truck-chassis and sold over a thousand units to the public transport companies in Italy.

The 1976 Friuli earthquake, with its epicenter in Osoppo, ruined most of the plants in Friuli-Venezia Giulia, including De Simon's. Ilvo with his sons Giovanni and Alvio managed to rebuild the plant in only two years' time. The new site covered 70,000 square meters and included two office buildings and a test track.

In 1978, De Simon together with Breda Costruzioni Ferroviarie formed a new consortium called Inbus, which in the 1980s achieved a 30% share of the national bus market. During this time, De Simon built a new construction plant in Palermo, Sicily, called IMEA, that would be the main supplier of the island for urban and interurban buses. During its ten years of existence the Inbus consortium produced about 6,000 buses, of which 30% were assembled by De Simon.

After the disbanding of the consortium in 1990, De Simon continued producing buses in collaboration with Iveco and Renault, introducing for the first time in Italy the bodies built from stainless steel.

Starting in 1993, De Simon focussed mainly on intercity buses built entirely from stainless steel, using chassis from European manufacturers Scania and later Mercedes-Benz. In the urban sector, De Simon held a franchise to sell in Italy the buses of the Belgian manufacturer Van Hool, between 8 and 18 meters in length, and available even with a natural gas-powered engine.

Between 1996 and 2002, the Romanian bus manufacturer Rocar and De Simon had a cooperation for the assembly of 400 urban buses as the models I410 and U 412.

In the following five years, the company developed a new range of buses called Millemiglia, designed for interurban lines, between 10.8 and 14 meters in length. Such fleets were for use in the towns of Apulia and Campania. Their line-up also included a touristic open-top bus called Millemiglia Zefiro.

In 2006, De Simon Group established themselves as a joint-stock company mainly managing the supply of spare parts for bus bodies and repairs, maintenance, and conversion of bus bodies.

In 2007, as an independent company, De Simon achieved a sales volume of 150 buses and a turnover of more than 20 million euros.

In 2008 the company decided to convert the business to the sole sale of spare parts and the repair of bodywork.

== Products ==
The current line-up of buses:

- De Simon Millemiglia 12 HD
- De Simon Millemiglia 10 HD
- De Simon Millemiglia 10 Eav
- De Simon Millemiglia Zefiro
