= Ford Model A engine =

Automobile engine

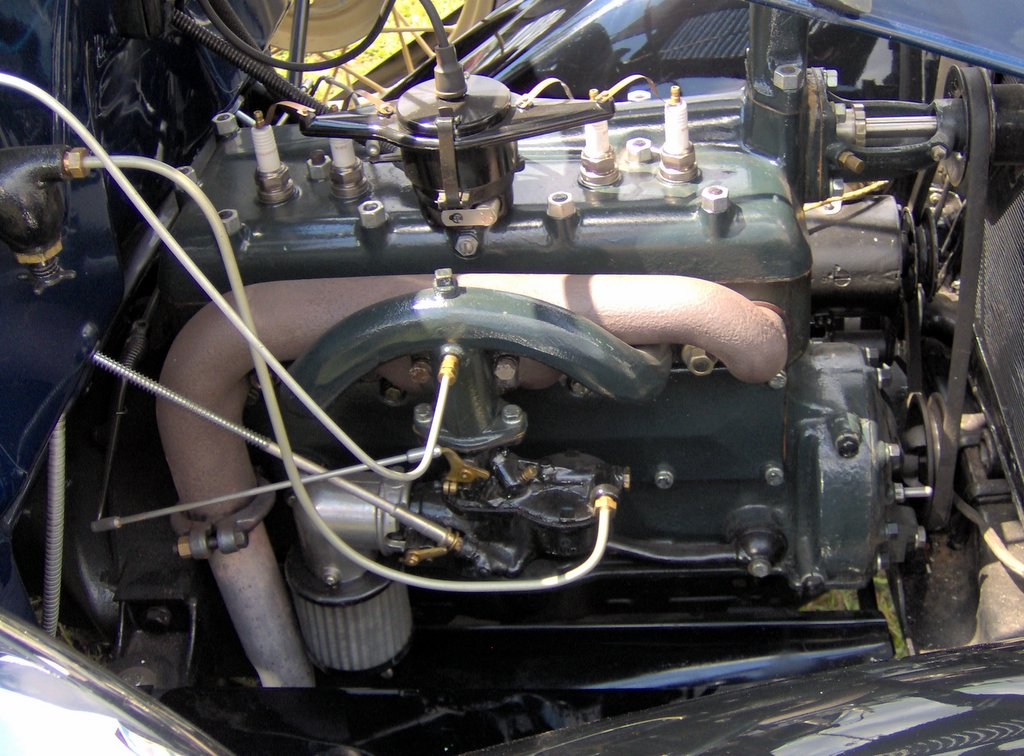

Overview
- Manufacturer: Ford Motor Company
- Production: 1927–1931

Layout
- Configuration: Inline-4
- Displacement: 200.5 cu in (3.3 L)
- Cylinder bore: 3.876 in (98.45 mm)
- Piston stroke: 4.125 in (104.8 mm)
- Cylinder block material: Cast iron, monobloc design
- Cylinder head material: Cast iron, detachable
- Valvetrain: Side valve (flathead)
- Compression ratio: 4.22:1

Combustion
- Fuel system: Gravity feed, Zenith (predominantly) and other carburetors
- Fuel type: gasoline
- Oil system: gravity feed; dip-and-splash
- Cooling system: Water-cooled, circulating pump and radiator

Output
- Power output: 40 hp (29.8 kW) brake
- Specific power: 24.03 hp (17.9 kW) SAE
- Torque output: 128 lb⋅ft (174 N⋅m) at 1,000 RPM

Dimensions
- Dry weight: approx. 350 lb (160 kg) with radiator and water

Chronology
- Predecessor: Ford Model T engine
- Successor: Ford Model B engine

The Ford Model A engine – primarily developed for the popular Ford Model A automobile (1927–1931, 4.8 million built) – was one of the most mass-produced automobile engines of the 1920s and 1930s, widely used in automobiles, trucks, tractors, and a wide variety of other vehicles and machinery.

A four-cylinder, carbureted, gasoline-fueled, piston engine, derived from the Ford Model T engine, the Ford Model A engine – with a bigger bore and stroke, and higher compression ratio – was twice as powerful as the Model T engine. Some derivatives, with improvements, were produced until 1958. Tens of thousands of the original design remain active even in the 21st century.

== Design and development ==
=== Development and production history ===
The Ford Model A engine was an evolution of the Ford Model T engine, but with double the power. It was developed in secret at Ford's Rouge Plant, in Michigan, and unveiled – with the Ford Model A automobile – December 2, 1927. The first Model A engine was completed earlier, October 20, 1927, and eventually installed in a 1928 Model A Fordor sedan, which Henry Ford gave to his friend, inventor Thomas A. Edison. There was immediate market demand for the Model A, but by January 1, 1928, just 5,275 Model A engines had been built – some not yet installed in a chassis, let alone shipped to a dealer.

However, by February 1929, production of the engines reached 1,000,000 units. At the end of Model A production in March 1932, 4,849,340 Model As had been built. (Several hundred thousand Model AA trucks had also been built, typically with the same Model A engine.) Model A historian Steve Plucker, using Ford company records, calculates that 4,830,806 production engines were built between October 1927 and November 1931.

All Model A engines built in the U.S. were built in the Rouge plant, however some were built at Ford plants in Canada and Europe. During that time, the Model A and AA engine cylinder block (part number A-6010), went through various external and internal changes.

The Model A was replaced by the 1932 Ford Model B, with an updated 4-cylinder engine, and by the 1932 Ford Model 18, with its new Ford V8 engine.

=== Basic design and characteristics ===
Like the Model T engine, the Model A engine was a water-cooled L-head inline-four (four vertical cylinders in line), "cast-en-bloc"-type piston engine. It had a displacement of 200.5 cu in (3.3 L) (compared to the Model T's 177 cu in (2.9 L)).

This engine provides 40 hp (30 kW; 41 PS) (brake horsepower) at 2,200 RPM – but at 1,000 RPM produces substantially more torque: 128 lb⋅ft (174 N⋅m). SAE-rated horsepower is 24.03, and compression ratio is 4.22:1.

The cylinder bore and piston stroke were also enlarged from the original Model T engine; they measured 3.876 in × 4.125 in (98.5 mm × 104.8 mm). Cylinder firing order is 1-2-4-3.

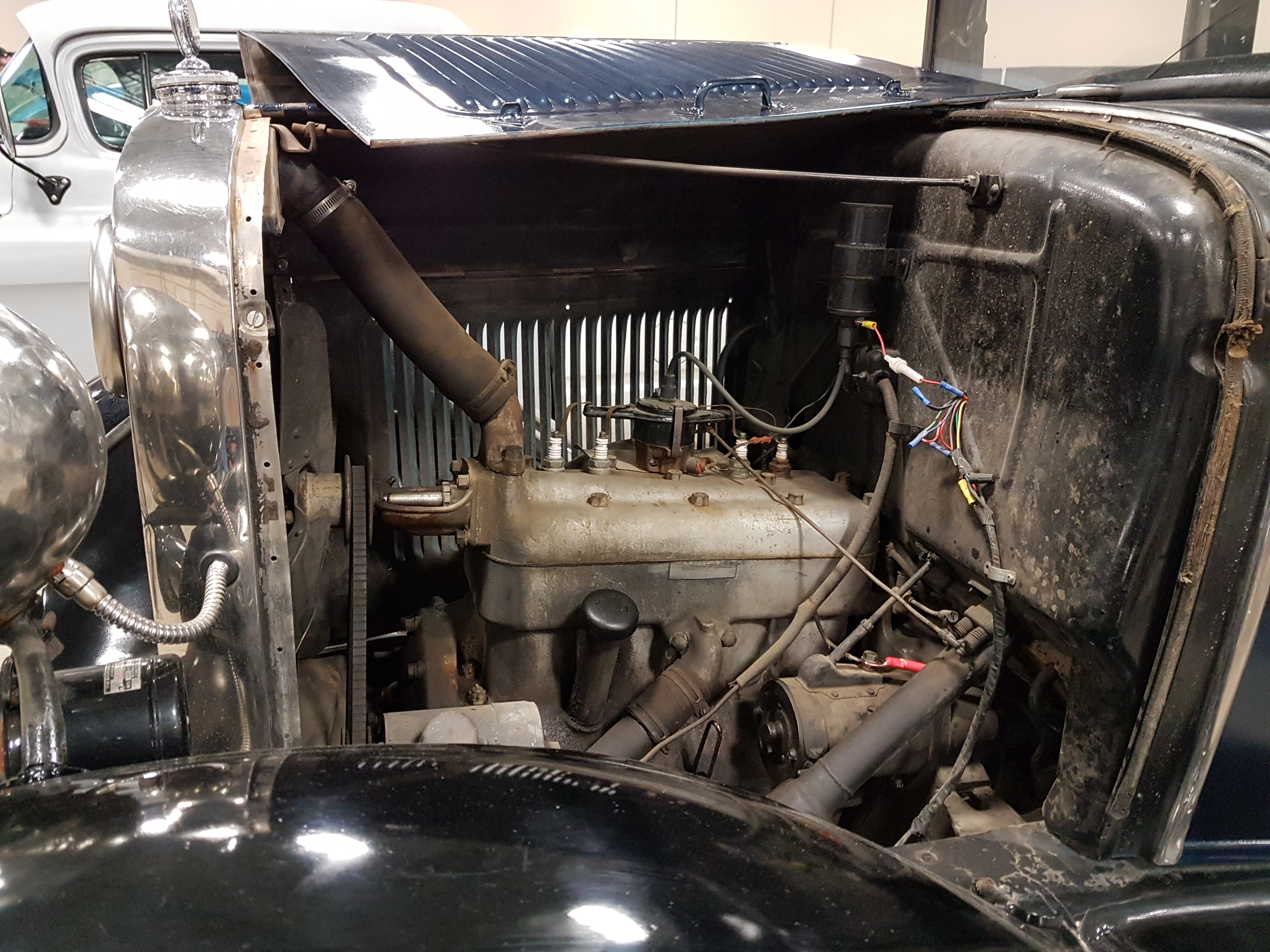
Ford Model A engine, left side

The engine has a 5-quart oil capacity. The crankcase is filled through an engine fill/breather tube mounted on the engine's left side. Modern 10W30 oils are recommended for newly rebuilt engines. The recommended oil change interval is 500 miles.

=== Comparison to modern designs ===
The Model A's engine has three main bearings (versus five found in modern 4-cylinder engines), and they are smaller diameter, and longer, than bearings in a modern engine. The bearings are poured babbitt bearings, rather than modern replaceable insert bearings.

Rather than a full pressure oil system typical of a modern engine, the Model A engine's oil system lubricates the main bearings by gravity feed, and lubricates the piston connecting rods by them dipping into the oil during motion.

A Model A engine has no crankshaft counterweights. There are no cam bearings. The Model A engine lacks valve seats, versus steel ring seats typical in a modern engine. The engine has a rather restricted intake port design, as compared to a modern engine.

== Equipment, accessories, and drivetrain ==
=== Intake, injection, and fuel ===
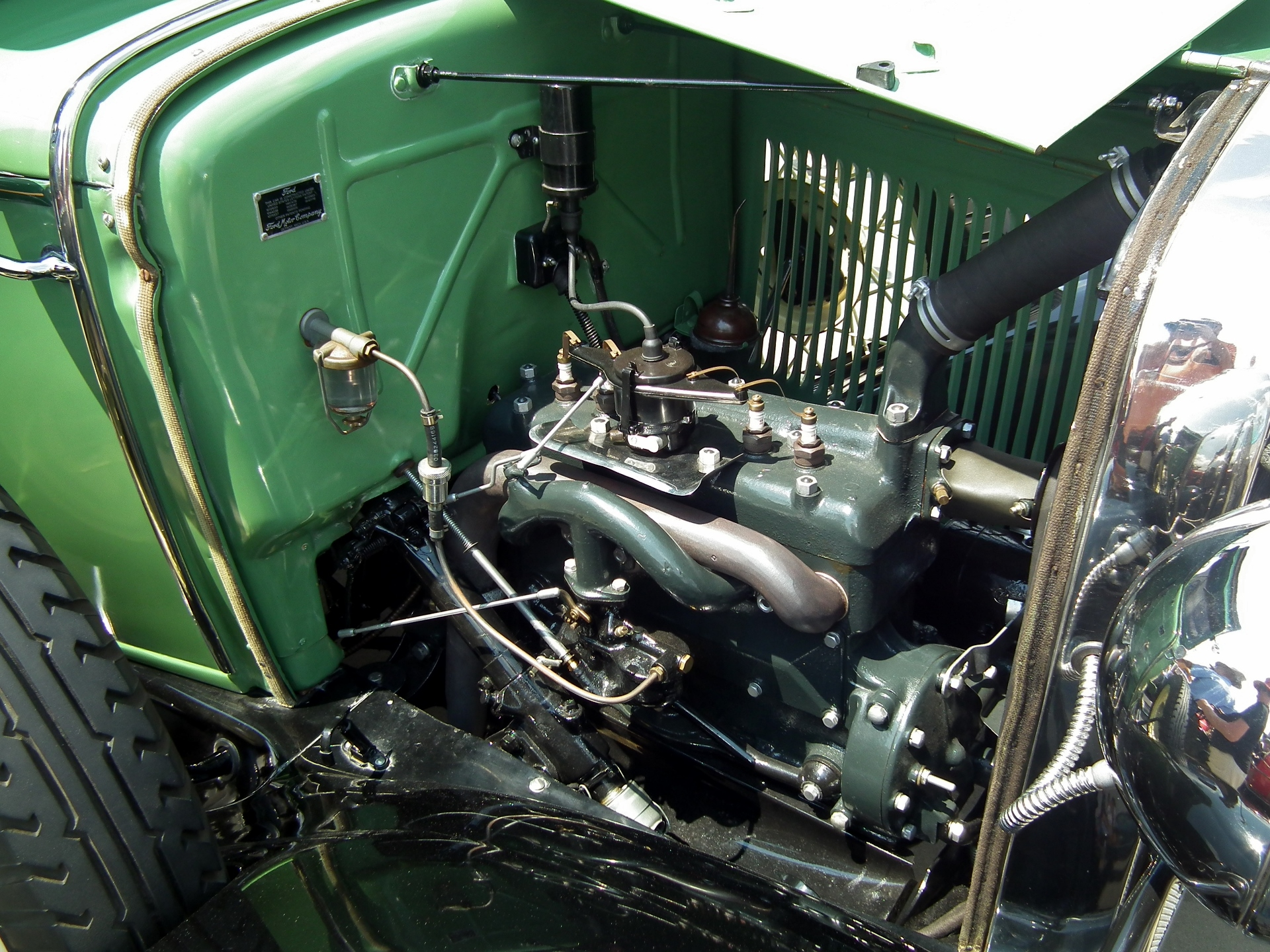
1930 Ford Model A woody panel van engine. An updraft carburetor feeds intake manifold on engine's right side. Linkages control throttle, mixture, and choke.

Normally, the Model A engine was supplied with a Zenith one-barrel, up-draft, float-type carburetor, which was gravity-fed from a tank in the engine cowl (between firewall and dash). The carburetor underwent many modifications during its relatively short (four-year) production run.

The Zenith has features, advanced for that era, that solved some early engine performance problems. The carburetor is designed to run lean, to allow for high-altitude driving. To allow better performance at low altitudes, and in cold weather, the fuel/air mixture ratio is controlled by a manual choke and "Gas Adjusting Valve" (GAV). To ensure adequate fuel flow during starting or acceleration, a secondary well momentarily provides an extra supply of fuel. A manual fuel shut-off valve is also supplied, and some also have a manual throttle.

Although the Zenith Model A carburetor was fitted to the engines in the vast majority of Ford Model A cars (reportedly to 3.5 million of the approximately 4.8 million built), it was not the only carburetor used. Another 19 brands were fitted to various Model A engines – either as original equipment or aftermarket retrofits – and some Model A engines were retrofitted with the slightly larger, more sophisticated Zenith designed for the Ford Model B engine.

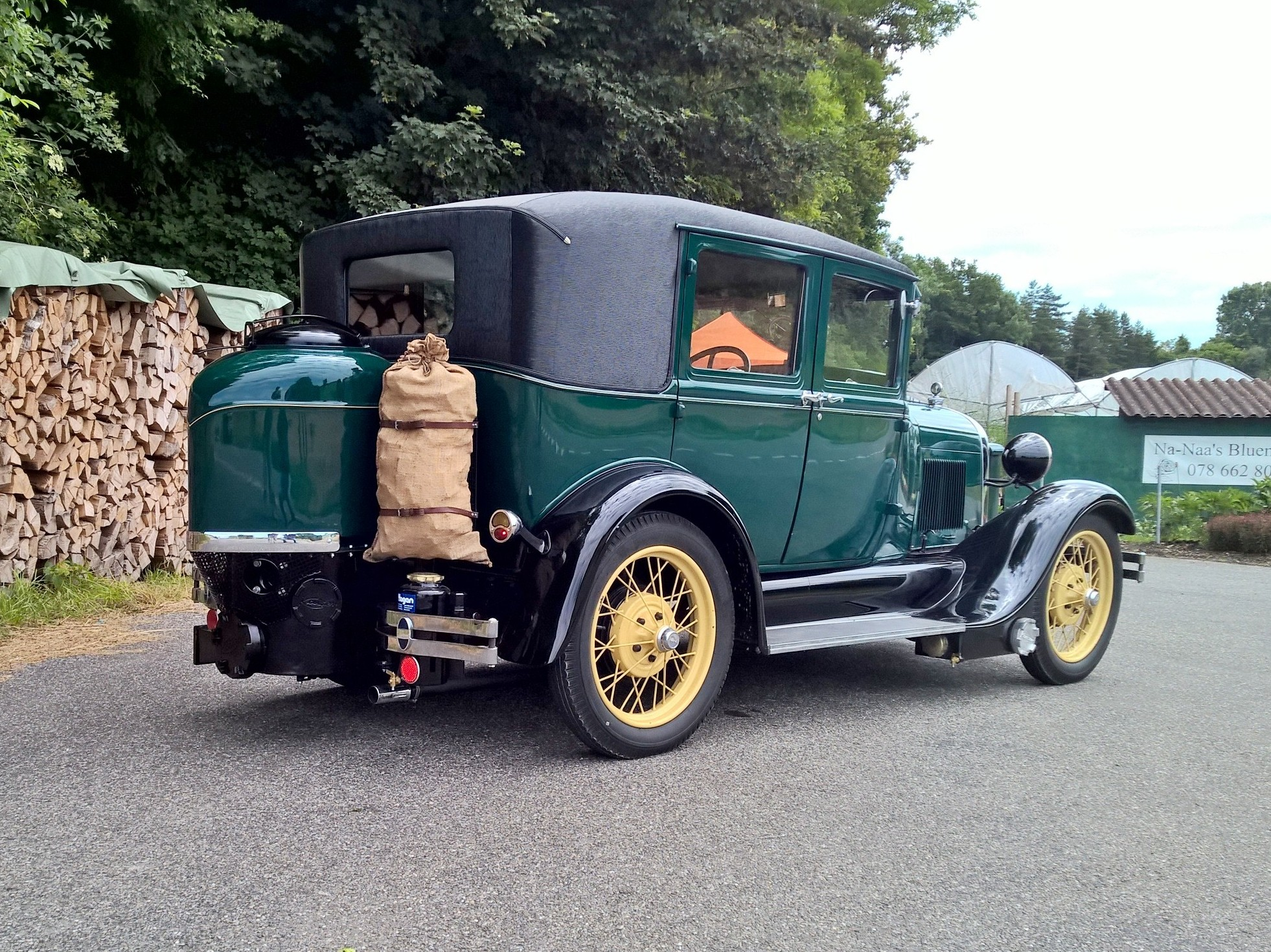
Ford Model A automobile converted to use wood gas from the gasification stove attached to the back of the car.

The engine works with modern unleaded regular gasoline.

In rare instances, the Model A engine has been powered by wood gas, produced in a wood gas generator, such as a "Gazogene," typically a large, sealed, stove-like cylinder mounted on the vehicle, or towed, which heated or burned wood (or charcoal), to produce fumes of flammable wood gas, as a minimal substitute for gasoline. The resulting gas was routed to the engine's intake manifold, via a duct and special induction system.

=== Engine electrical system ===
The electrical system supporting the engine typically consisted of a 6-volt battery, a 6-volt DC generator (driven by a belt connected to the crankshaft pulley), starter, lights, ammeter, and ignition system (ignition coil, distributor, spark plugs) with connecting wires. A manual spark lever advances or retards the ignition, particularly retarding the spark plug ignition during engine starting.

The Model A was configured with a positive-ground system (positive battery terminal connected to vehicle frame and engine block) – opposite of the norm in modern "negative-ground" vehicles, often causing technical confusion.

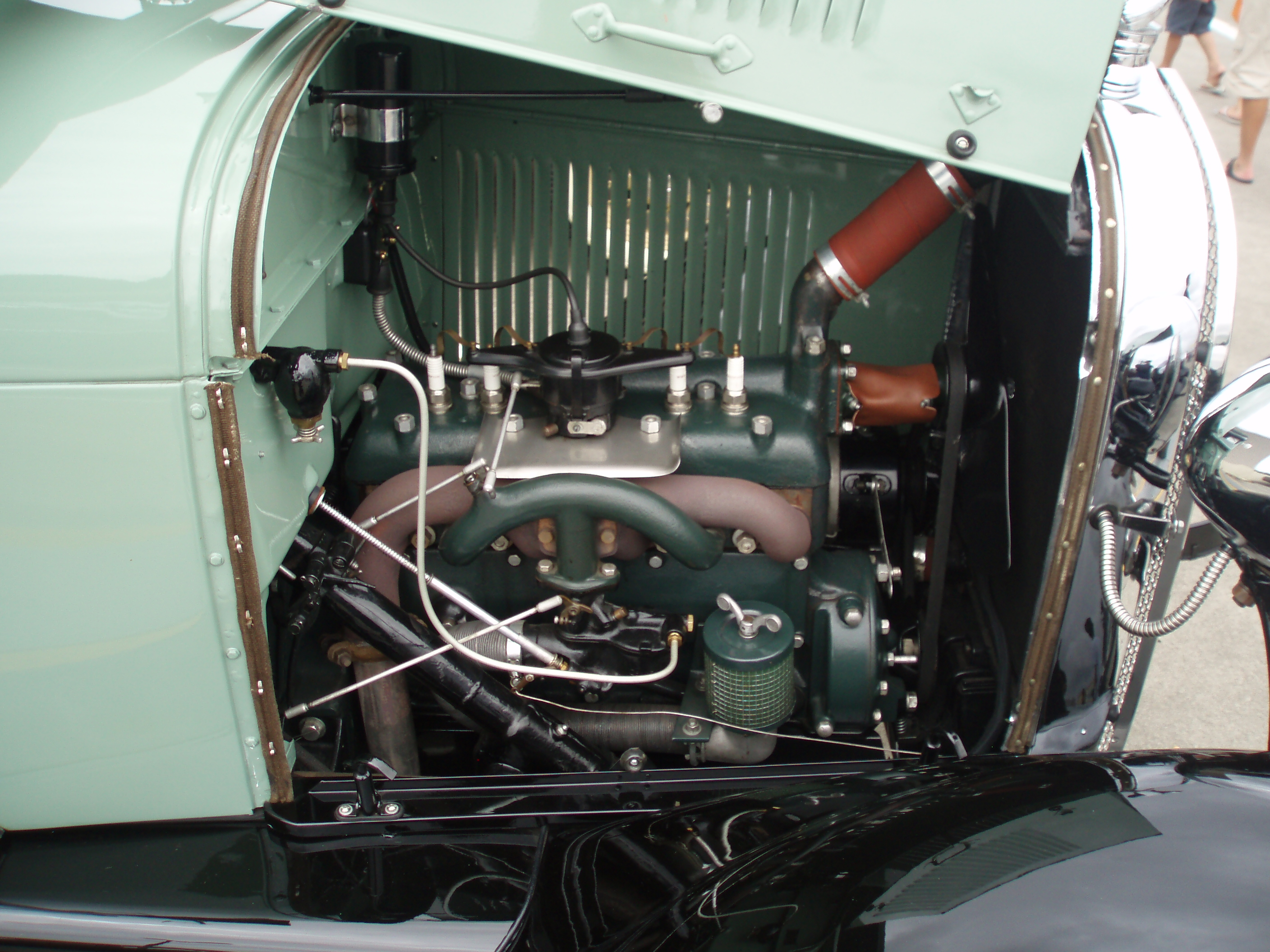
Model A engine cooling system includes belt-driven fan-and-pump assembly projecting forward from the cylinder head (shown: red pump, black 2-blade fan). Water travels up through angled red tube to top of radiator at front of car.

=== Engine cooling system ===
The Model A engine uses a centrifugal water pump, mounted to the engine cylinder head, and it works with the engine fan. The Model A engine uses plain water to cool the engine; antifreeze coolant is not recommended because the original Model A radiator is not a pressurized system. The pump circulates radiator-cooled water into the lower engine, and as the water becomes heated in the block's water jacket, it is forced out of the water jacket through the upper radiator hose, and back into the radiator, where it cools, and settles, and the cycle repeats.

=== Drivetrain ===
==== Model A automobile ====
When implemented in the Ford Model A automobile, the Model A engine was coupled, via a 63-pound flywheel, and clutch, with a traditional three-speed, sliding gear ("sliding-pinion" type), manual transmission (compared to the earlier Model T's planetary band-type gearbox).

The Ford three-speed, selective sliding gear transmission (with 1-speed reverse) initially came (on early 1928 cars) with a multiple-disc clutch (as on the Model T), but it was eventually replaced with a single-plate clutch. There were no synchronizers, making "double clutching" a useful skill for Model A drivers.

The drivetrain ended at the wheels with the final drive ratio of 3.77:1. On a typical Model A, this typically provided 25–30 miles per gallon, and speeds up to 65 miles per hour.

==== Model AA truck ====
When the Model A engine is implemented in the 1.5-ton Ford Model AA truck, the engine serial number – normally preceded by the single letter "A" – is, instead, preceded by "AA", denoting the implementation of a stronger clutch spring, to accommodate multiple-disc clutch units, or (for single-disc clutch units) the AA-7563 clutch pressure plate and its cover assembly, or units with the 4-speed transmission and clutch.

Various transmissions and other drivetrain options were offered. Combinations of drivetrain equipment affected the top speed which an AA could reach, while slower, lower-geared AA's could pull with greater torque.

The AA trucks were typically supplied with the 3-speed transmission of the Model A automobile, or an optional AA truck 4-speed transmission. If equipped with the 3-speed transmission, a "Dual High" factory-option underdrive for the AA was offered. The AA's rear axles were available with two different gear ratios.

Various aftermarket drivetrain options were available, including the Warford 3-speed transmission.

== Operational history and adaptations ==
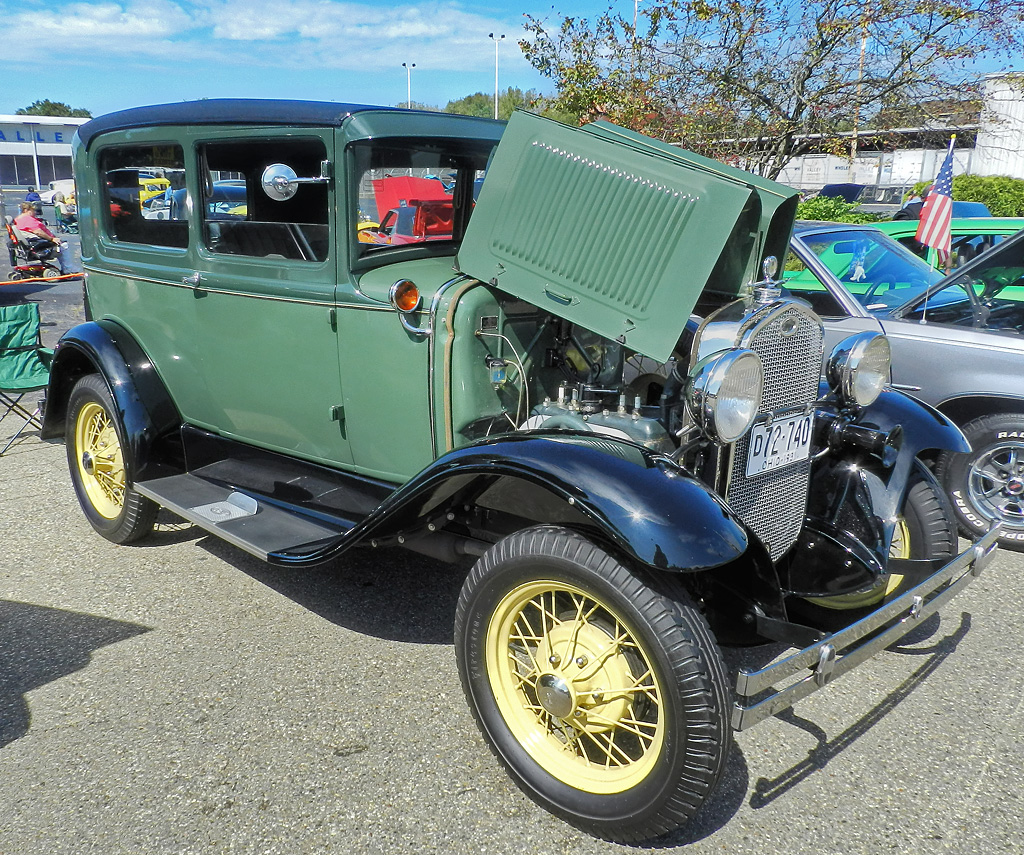
Ford Model A Deluxe Tudor, with hood lifted to show Model A engine; Portsmouth, Ohio, 2011, photo by Don O'Brien

The Ford Model A engine, produced in the millions, was one of the most mass-produced automobile engines of the 1920s and 1930s, used in automobiles, trucks, tractors, farm machinery, industrial applications, boats, military vehicles, and even aircraft.

With an already established dealer-and-servicing network created by Ford for the Model T, the Ford Model A and its engine had the advantage of a pre-positioned distribution-and-support network. This superior support system further enhanced sales. As the Ford system grew, and as economies of scale made the engine more competitive against rivals, the Model A engine rapidly became increasingly popular for a wide range of applications, across the United States, and around the world. The vast quantities of Ford Model A engines produced, during a short time, flooded the market.

Even after the engine was superseded by Ford's Model B engine, and discontinued by Ford in 1932, demand for used Model A engines, or license-built copies, continued – for a growing range of applications, with some Model A engines remaining in service for decades. Some derivatives, with improvements, were produced until 1958. Tens of thousands of the original design remain active even in the 21st Century – particularly powering Ford Model A cars preserved as recreational antiques.

=== Automobiles ===
==== Range of application ====
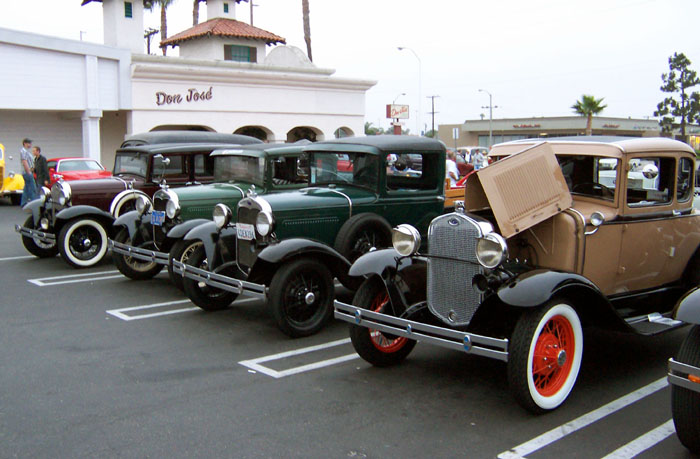
Ford Model A lineup, different models. Huntington Beach, California, July 24, 2004, photo by Morven.

Primarily developed for the popular Ford Model A automobile (1927–1931), the Ford Model A engine was the engine almost universally installed in that automobile, of which 4.8 million were built by 1932, in a wide range of styles and configurations: Coupe, Business Coupe, Roadster Coupe, Sport Coupe, Convertible Cabriolet, Convertible Sedan, Victoria, Tudor, Phaeton, Town Car, 2- and 3-window Fordor, Station Wagon, Taxicab, Commercial and Truck.

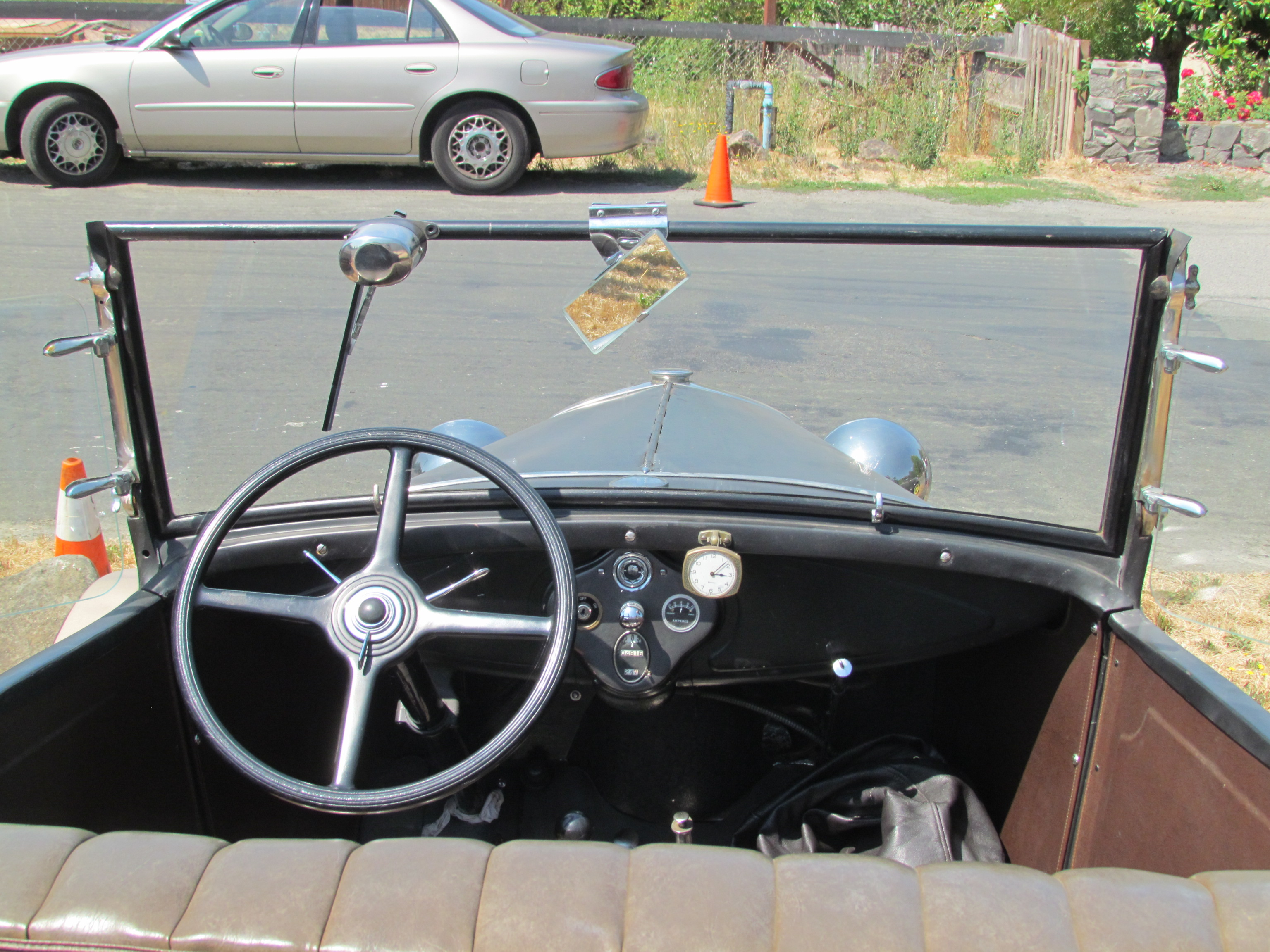
Ford Model A engine controls: spark advance and manual throttle levers on steering column, accelerator and starter pedals on floor, ignition key-switch on instrument panel's left lobe, gas-adjusting valve (mixture) and gas shutoff on small white knob under dash at right, in front of passenger.

==== Controls and adjustments ====
In automotive applications, the Ford Model A engine originally used a complex assortment of controls, including accelerator pedal, manual throttle, choke and mixture control (officially known as "Gas Adjusting Valve" or GAV), gas shutoff, ignition key-switch, starter pedal, and manual spark advance (in addition drivetrain controls: clutch and gear-shifter).

These controls were mounted on the floor (accelerator and starter pedals), or steering column (spark advance and manual throttle), or on (or immediately below) the dashboard. Reportedly, the State of Pennsylvania required the gas shutoff valve to be mounted inside the engine compartment, instead.

Starting the Model A engine commonly requires a detailed sequence of manipulation of all these controls, and properly shutting down the engine is almost as complex.

Additionally, occasional adjustment of the idle throttle and idle mixture controls, mounted on the carburetor, may be required.

=== Trucks ===
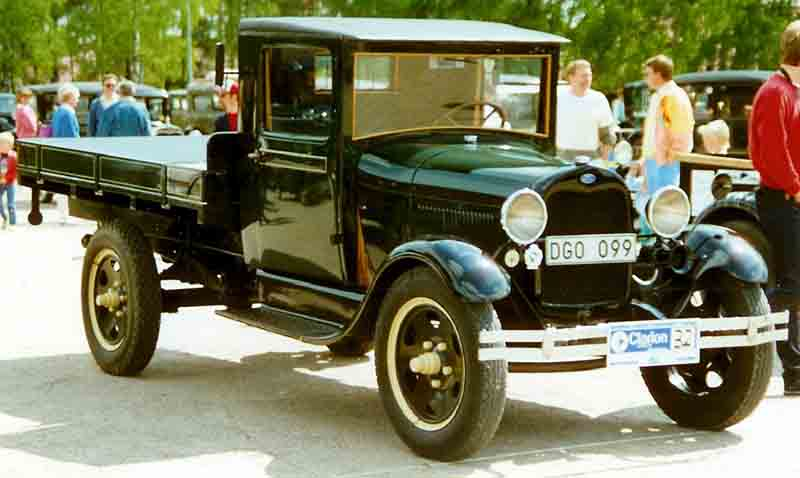
1929 Ford Model AA heavy-duty truck, a variant of the Model A

The 1.5-ton Ford Model AA truck – produced for only five years, but widely used for decades – was powered by the Ford Model A engine, commonly driving a four-speed manual transmission.

The U.S. Postal Service – to eliminate the complexity and cost of its variety of postal trucks (including 1,444 acquired as war surplus), and to accommodate the needs of parcel post service – purchased a fleet of Model A and AA vehicles from Ford, fitted with custom-built postal truck bodies manufactured and assembled by outside builders, mounted on a Ford Model A and AA chassis. These trucks remained in use, until the 1950s.

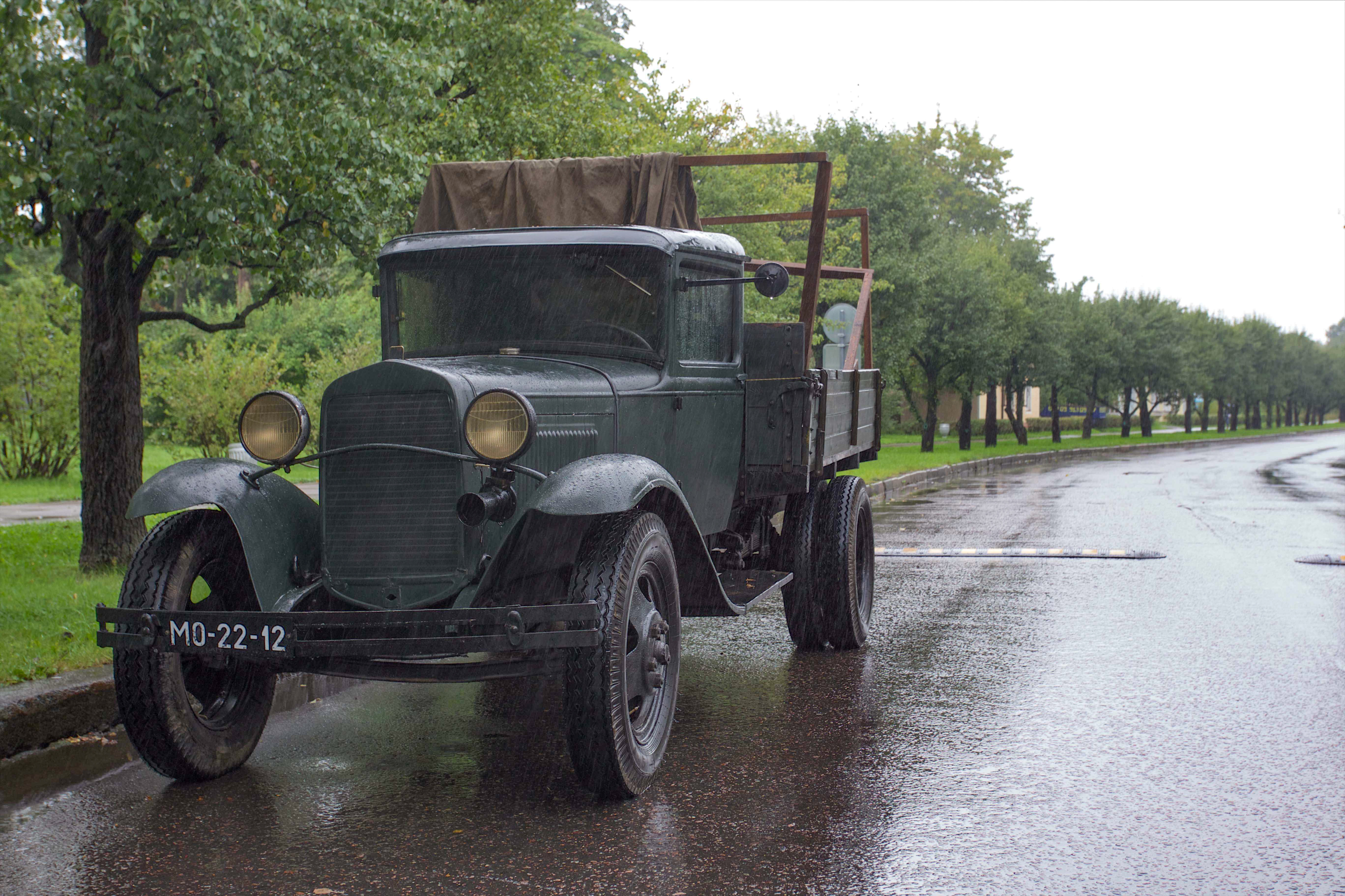
Soviet GAZ-AA, originally built with Ford Model AA components.

Other truck manufacturers used the Ford Model A engine, as well, or a variant thereof – particularly if they were also using a Ford Model A or Model AA chassis, or license-building the same under their own name. The GAZ-AA (Soviet Union), produced from 1931 to 1938 is one example, though by 1938 it was using an improved engine.

Model AA trucks commonly used engine controls similar to those in Model A automobiles.

=== Racing ===
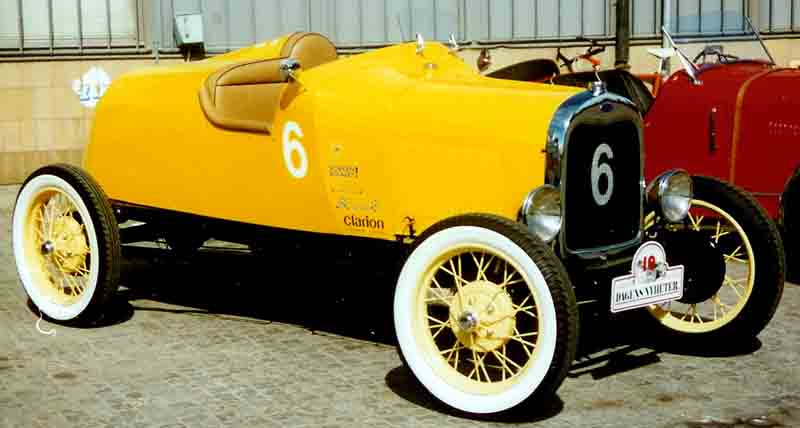
Ford Model A Racer 1928

During the 1930s, the Ford Model A (and Model B) engines were popular for racing, in part because their lightweight internal moving parts had little inertia to overcome in acceleration – both from the starting line, and from acceleration out of curves. However, that same light construction resulted in fragile engines that often broke during a race.

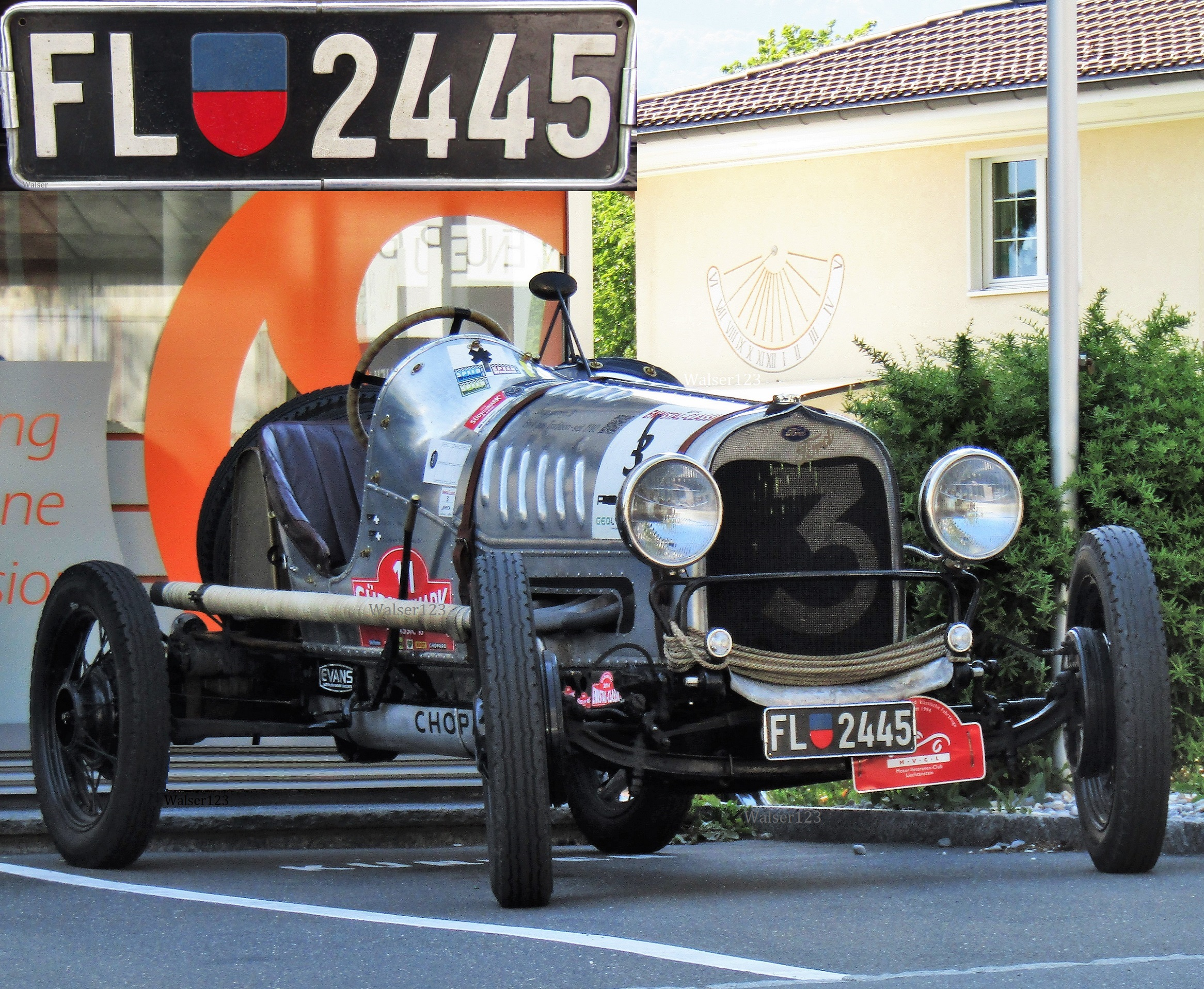
1929 Ford Model A Special Racer

Aftermarket parts and modifications became widely available, enabling improvements for racing – with some modified engines reaching compression ratios of 12:1, producing 250 horsepower. The Ford Model A and B engines dominated American auto racing until World War II

Some racing is still done with Ford Model A engines, and high-performance aftermarket modifications are available to increase performance, with some achieving 110 horsepower, at compression ratios of up to 6.5-to-1.

=== Tractors ===
==== Great Depression (1930s) ====
Some Model A Ford engines were used to power tractors. The 1929 Worthington Model A golf tractor was fitted with a Model A engine, as was the scarce PAL Tractor.

Thieman Harvester Company / Thieman Brothers, in 1936, began offering tractors – either complete with Ford Model A engine (about $500), or as a kit, without engine, driveshaft, or rear end ($185). Farmers were expected to cut costs on kits by buying used parts to complete them, but the company recommended a Ford HD truck radiator and four-blade fan.

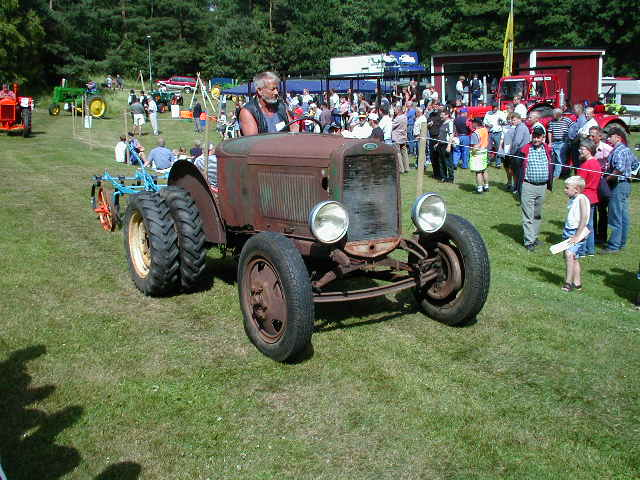
Model A Ford converted to a tractor

Some other manufacturers' tractors, such as Thrifty Tractor (starting in 1930, and listed in the Sears spring and fall catalogs from 1932 to 1941), were sold by Sears, Montgomery Ward, and others as kits, without the engine – though designed to use the Ford Model A engine, which buyers were expected to find on their own. Some even required a whole Model A vehicle, to be cannibalized for the conversion, though others only required the engine and a few other components.

Evolving from the kits they sold, Sears, Roebuck & Company's Economy (or "New Economy") tractors, first built in 1938 by Peru Plow Works, were complete tractors, with a rebuilt Ford Model A engine included, along with self-starter, governor, special carburetor, air cleaner and oil filter. The Economy offered belt drive and power take-off (PTO) options, to allow the engine to power other farm machinery. The Economy was priced at $495, about half the price of other tractors and, by far, the least-expensive 2-plow tractor available then. Estimates of units sold vary – from under 500, to about 1000 – with the line discontinued around 1940.

Some farmers even designed and built their own tractors, and powered them with the Model A engine.

During the economic conditions of the Great Depression, which financially devastated many farmers, various low-cost tractors powered by the relatively affordable and common Ford Model A engine provided a relatively inexpensive and minimal tractor for essential, basic agricultural work.

==== World War II and after (1940s) ====
During World War II, a national tractor shortage motivated some American farmers to build their own tractors from Model A components. These were known as "doodlebug tractors."

Around 1946, the line of Speedex Tractors (initially Pond Tractors) added the Speedex Model FG ("Farm and Garden Tractor"), which used the Ford Model A engine and other Ford parts. However, production ended in 1948 when Ford became a competitor, manufacturing tractors of its own, and stopped selling components to Speedex.

=== Military vehicles ===
==== In Ford military vehicles ====
Ford Model A and Model AA vehicles, modified, were the basis of the U.S. Army's first serious development of the motorized light field artillery gun battery. In 1932, at Fort Bragg, North Carolina, the 17th Field Artillery Ford Motorized Battery used these vehicles to transport 75mm guns, supplies, and support and command personnel.

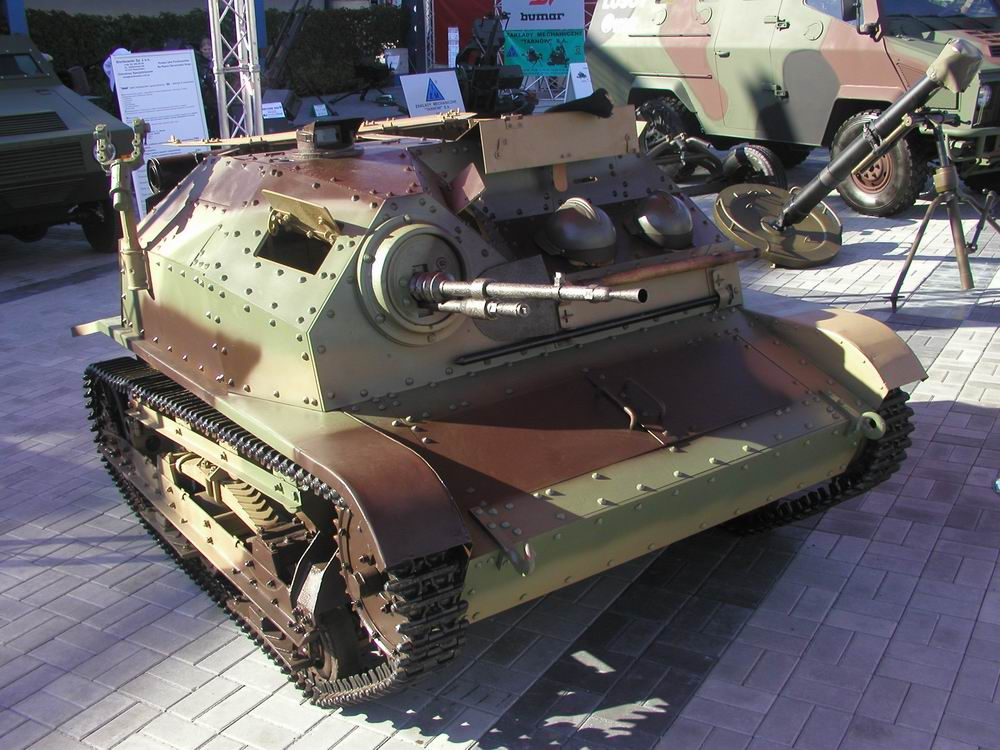
Polis TKS tankette

Previously, the Army had relied on horses and mules to transport light artillery; this experiment changed that.

==== In other military vehicles ====
Although the Ford Model A and Model AA trucks were not built with a chassis strong enough for the weight of armor, some countries developed armored cars, and even miniature tanks, on those chassis, anyway – generally with the Ford Model A engine, or a variant thereof. Some were largely devoid of Ford structure, but used the Ford Model A engine and/or a derivative. Examples include the wheeled FAI & FAI-M (Soviet Union) armored cars, and the tracked TKD and TK-3 "tankettes" (Poland) (lightweight, fast scout tanks – 690 in all – the short-lived bulk of Polish armor at the start of World War II).

=== Aircraft ===
==== Great Depression substitute ====
Compared to most automotive engines, aircraft engines are typically highly refined (for very high reliability, light weight, continuous high power settings, at high torque and low-RPM, with air-cooling and redundant systems, and unusual flight conditions) – usually produced in relatively small quantities – and are thus are very expensive.

In the 1930s, during the Great Depression, aviation enthusiasts were frustrated by the cost of acquiring or building an airplane, largely due to the most expensive part: the engine. Some built their own "homebuilt" airplanes, using whatever engines they could find – particularly automobile engines, usually modified.

The most plentiful engines of the time were Ford Model T, Model A, and Model B engines. The Model A engine, available cheaply, and fairly light while providing 40 horsepower – and designed for operation at low-RPM speeds ideal for propellers – proved adaptable to some single-seat or two-seat aircraft. Its carburetor's design for high-altitude operation, and its "Gas Adjusting Valve" (GAV) mixture control, enabled in-flight adjustment to altitude changes.

==== The $700 airplane competition ====
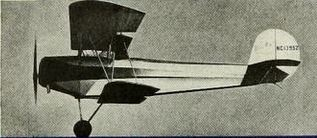
Wiley Post Model A.

In November, 1933, the U.S. Bureau of Air Commerce started a program to make personal aircraft as common as medium-priced automobiles. The Bureau encouraged aircraft manufacturers to design a simple, safe aircraft priced at $700 or less. It invested money to develop conversions of Ford auto engines for aircraft use, with the expectation of cutting the cost of an airplane's engine, from 60% of an aircraft's total cost, down to just to 25%.

The program yielded only three aircraft that earned Approved Type Certificates: The $990 Wiley Post Model A biplane, using the Ford Model A engine – the first airplane certified in the U.S. with an automobile engine (though only about 13 were built) – plus versions of the Arrow Sport (using a Ford V-8 engine), and the Funk Model B (using a modified Ford Model B engine).

==== Pietenpol AirCamper ====
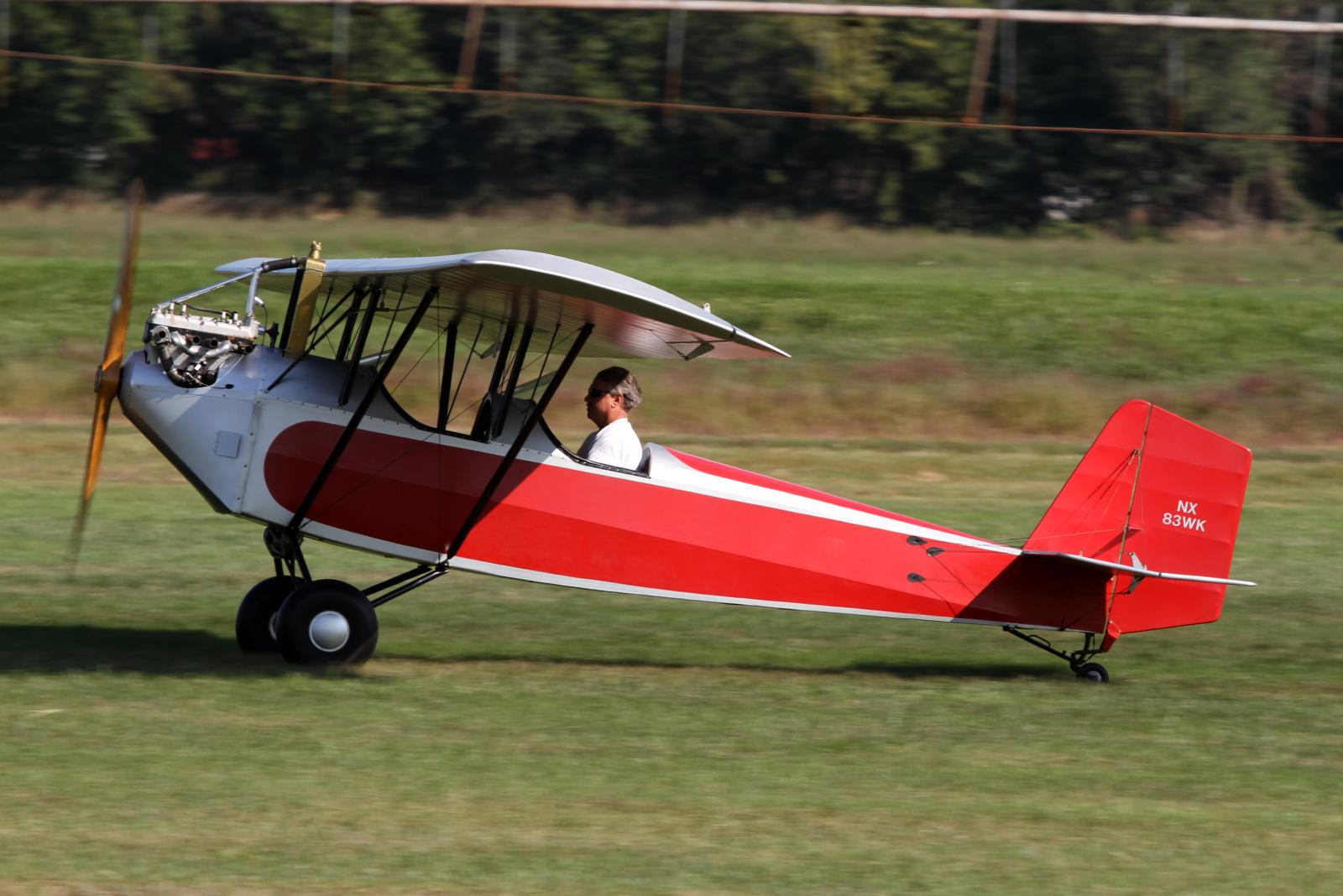
Pietenpol Air Camper with Ford Model A engine, radiator directly in front of pilot.

The airplane most famously equipped with the Model A engine was the Pietenpol Air Camper, a popular homebuilt aircraft designed by Bernard Pietenpol, who eventually standardized his design on the Ford Model A engine.

Though all Pietenpol homebuilts put the engine in the nose of the plane, configurations varied widely. Some modified the cylinders to allow for a second spark plug (to accommodate dual ignition systems for redundant safety and enhanced performance). Some replaced the battery/generator-powered coil-and-distributor ignition system with one or two aftermarket magnetos for greater reliability.

Some were customized with aluminum heads. A few were modified with air-cooled cylinders, but most used the engine's water-cooling system, usually with the original Ford radiator. Though radiator placements varied, it was most often placed immediately above the engine, significantly blocking the pilot's forward view. Others placed the radiator under the engine cowling, above the wing, or elsewhere. Additional modifications could include carburetor heat piping and a shorter water pump.

Fuel to a Pietenpol's Ford engine is generally gravity-fed from a header tank or wing tank (Pietenpols have a high wing). Exhaust generally is not muffled, with headers often replaced by short exhaust stacks.

The Pietenpol designs, despite having adapted to many other engines over the decades, are still occasionally built with Ford Model A engines. However, the strain of aircraft operations results in a higher rate of engine failure with automotive engines, and Pietenpol pilots thus-equipped generally plan for the risk of occasional off-field forced landings.

=== Industrial, agricultural and marine ===
==== The Model A "industrial" engine ====
Ford offered the Model A engine, very slightly modified, as the "Ford Industrial Engine," for "industrial, agricultural or marine purposes." The "industrial engine" was advertised as producing 39 brake horsepower at 2200 rpm, or 23 horsepower at the engine's more customary 1000 rpm.

The engine was offered in three models in 1930:

- A-6002 – Engine with clutch and transmission, $180 (serial numbers typically in the format "*IA#######*")
- AA-6002 – Engine with heavy duty (truck) clutch and 4-speed transmission, $190 (serial numbers typically in the format "*IAA#######*")
- A-6007 – Engine, without clutch or transmission, $135.

Ford offered "special wholesale prices to manufacturers," and advertised that "complete service" for the engine was available "from any of the ... Authorized Ford Dealers ... throughout the country."

==== Industrial use ====
The Ford Model A engine was used to power various industrial machinery, some with very unusual adaptations. For example, Gordon Smith & Co. (Bowling Green, Kentucky), developed a portable air compressor conversion of the Model A engine, which used cylinders 1 and 4 normally, for motive power – but used cylinders 2 and 3 for air compression. This hybrid industrial adaptation was produced through the 1950s.

In another case, a Ford Model A engine was used to drive a suction pump used to dredge the bottoms of bodies of water for gold mining. At another site, another Model A engine was used to reverse a dredge's bucket line when it scooped a rock too big for the machine. The engine has also been used to power drilling rigs.

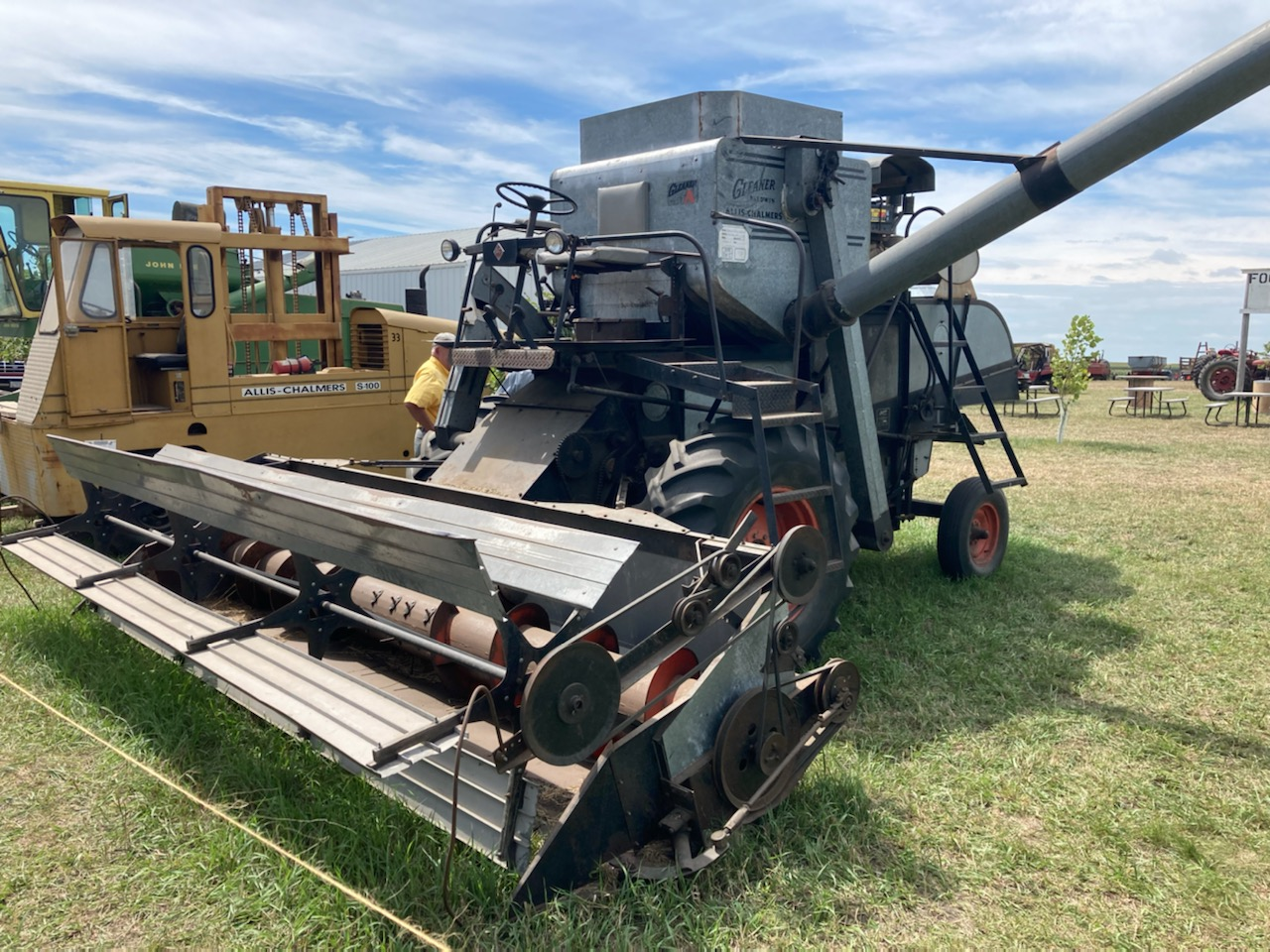
Gleaner Model A Combine

==== Agricultural use ====
In addition to the Ford Model A engine's use in tractors, its industrial variant also powered the popular Gleaner-Baldwin farm combines. The Gleaner Baldwin Model A, built from 1930 to 1935, was so equipped, as were later Gleaner Models, the NA and NR, until 1938. The combine's Model A engine was mounted on a frame fitted for the radiator, and was coupled to a power take-off unit.

==== Marine use ====
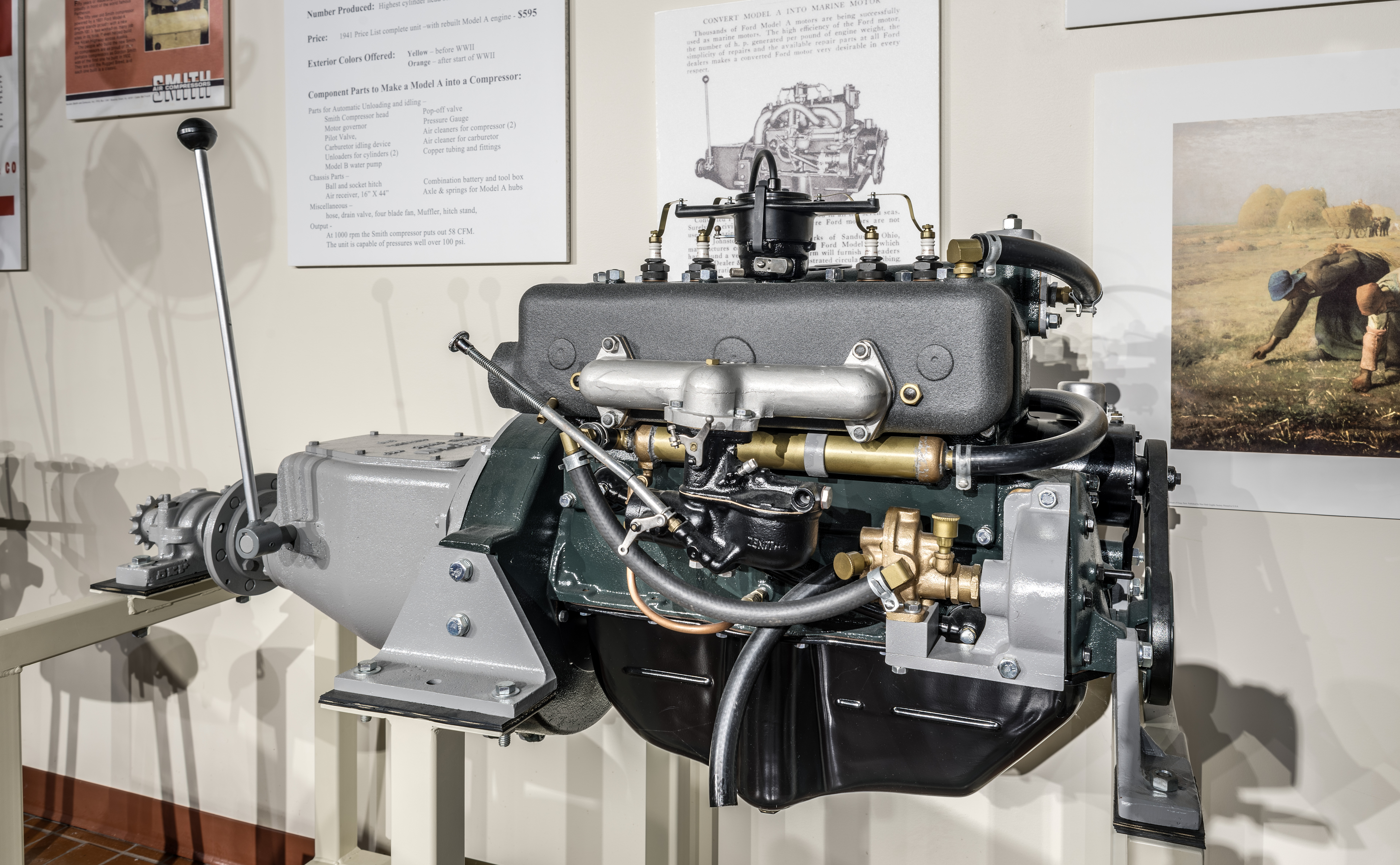
Ford Model A Marine engine at the Gilmore Car Museum

Some Model A engines powered boats. In 1931, and again in 1935, Popular Mechanics Press published The Boat Book: Everything of Interest to the Amateur Boatman, with plans for building a modified recreational boat – a Gentleman's Racer / Gentleman's Runabout, common in the 1920s and 1930s. It called for powering the boat with a Ford Model A engine – though it was not ideal, owing to weight, temperament, and carburetors that sometimes leaked fuel. Nevertheless, it also powered other speedboats, as well.

Other marine applications for the Model A engine have been developed – including powering small commercial fishing boats, and air boats and boat-beaching systems.

== Modern Developments ==
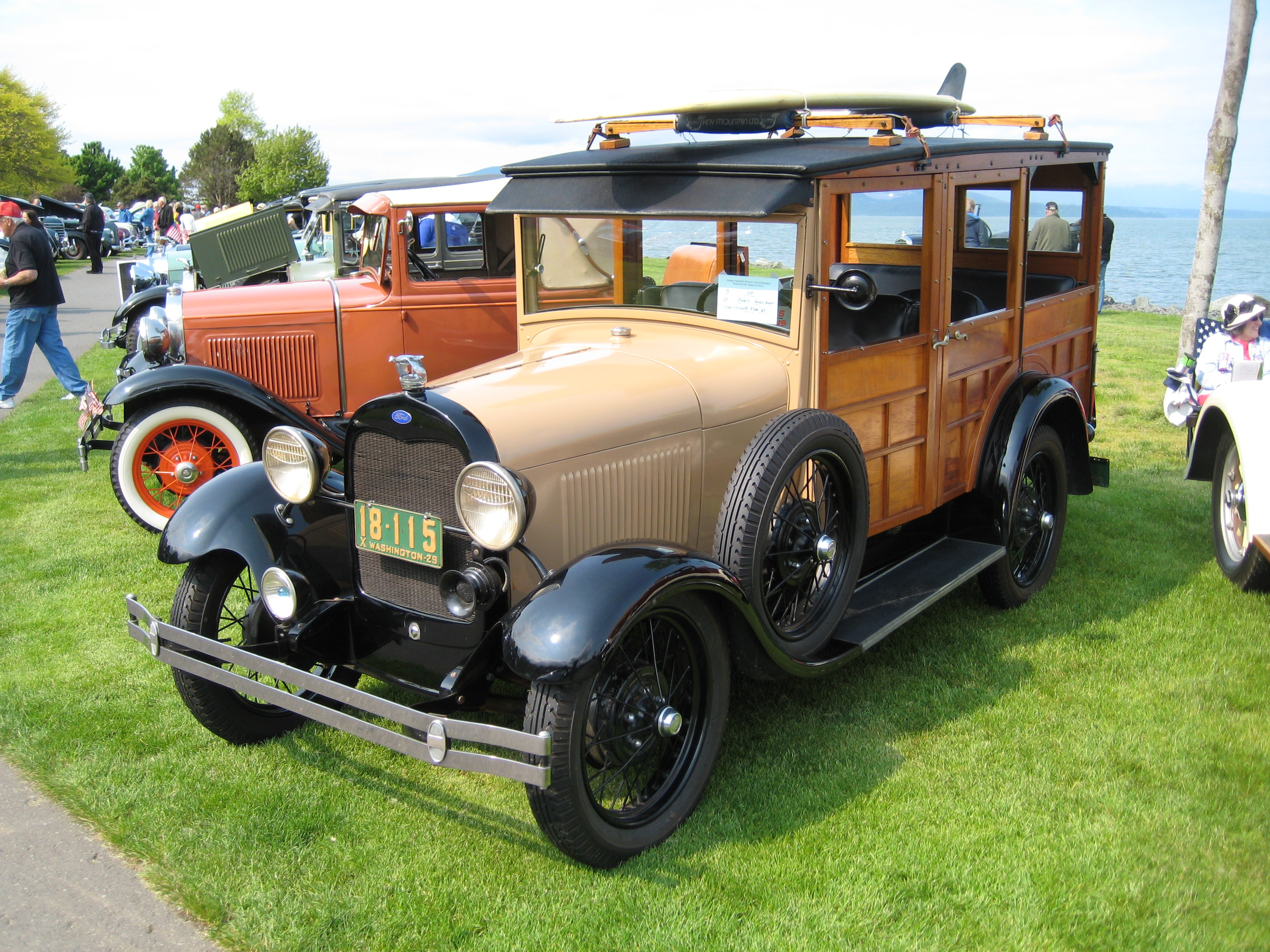
Lots of early Fords – still active and powered by the Model A engine – at this waterfront car show, Bellingham, Washington, May 29, 2011

The Ford Model A engine remains in demand, chiefly to power vintage Ford Model A automobiles (an estimated 200,000) kept for recreational purposes. A very few are still used to power light aircraft, such as the Pietenpol Air Camper.

Several individuals and enterprises have specialized in the preservation, restoration, modification, and supplying of replacement parts and modifications for the engine.

Additionally, Model A engine aficionado and engineer Terry Burtz, of Campbell, California, after a prolonged research and development program, has begun the manufacturing and sale of new Model A engine blocks, and kits for constructing an entire Model A engine, tweaked with various refinements typical of modern engines.

Several organizations, publications and websites support owners of vehicles that use the Model A engine, including antique auto, truck, and tractor clubs, as well as experimental aircraft associations. These organizations often provide information and advice about the Ford Model A engine and its variants and relatives.

== Specifications (1927–1931) ==
- Type: Reciprocating piston engine
- Engine case: L-head
- Displacement: 200.5 cu in (3.3 L)
- Cylinders: 4, vertical, inline
- Bore: 3.876 in (98.5 mm)
- Stroke: 4.125 in (104.8 mm)
- Compression ratio: 4.22:1
- Power: 40 hp (30 kW; 41 PS) at 2200 RPM
- Torque: 128 lb⋅ft (174 N⋅m)
- Cooling: Water-cooled
- Ignition: Spark plug, via distributor and coil, fed by battery and DC generator
- Weight: 350 lb (160 kg) (complete engine, without flywheel and clutch assembly, but including generator, manifolds, etc.).
- Aspiration & injection: Normally aspirated via Zenith updraft carburetor, fed by gravity from cowl tank.
- Fuel: Gasoline
