= Doodlebug =

Doodlebug, doodle bug, or doodlebugging may refer to:

== Animals ==
- Cockchafer or doodlebug, a European beetle
- Woodlouse or doodlebug
  - Armadillidiidae or doodlebug, a family of woodlice
- Doodlebugs, the larvae of antlions, a family of insect

== Film ==
- Doodlebug (film), a 1997 short film by Christopher Nolan
- Caroline "Doodlebug" Bichon, a character in the 1995 film Something to Talk About
- Doodlebug Simkins, a character in the 1975 film Cleopatra Jones

== Transportation ==
=== Aircraft ===
- V-1 flying bomb or the Doodlebug
- Flylight Doodle Bug, a British powered hang glider
- Heuberger Doodle Bug, an American home-built aircraft
- McDonnell Doodlebug, a 1920s light aircraft

=== Rail and road ===
- Doodlebug (railcar), a self-propelled railroad vehicle
- Doodle Bug scooter, a 1950s motor scooter
- Doodlebug tractor, an American World War II home-built tractor
- Texaco Doodlebug, a 1930s tanker truck

== Other uses ==
- Doodlebug, nickname of Craig Irving, American rapper from the group Digable Planets
- Doodle Bug, a 1985 video game for the VIC-20
- Doodlebugging, various pseudoscientific methods of dowsing for underground materials or objects, particularly petroleum
- Doodlebugging, locating underground petroleum and natural gas deposits using reflection seismology
