= Tumblebug =

Tumblebug may refer to:

- Tumble Bug, a model of amusement ride
- Dung beetle
- Rollover (reversible) plow
- Fresno scraper, earthmoving tool
- A self-balancing motorized unicycle used by maintenance workers in Robert Heinlein's story "The Roads Must Roll"
- Slinky (Australia)
- Tumblebugs, a 2005 video game
- Dung Beetles (video game), a 1982 computer game, also known as Tumble Bugs

== See also ==
- Doodlebug (disambiguation)
- Tumble (disambiguation)
- Bug (disambiguation)
