= Zenith Carburetor Company =

American carburetor company

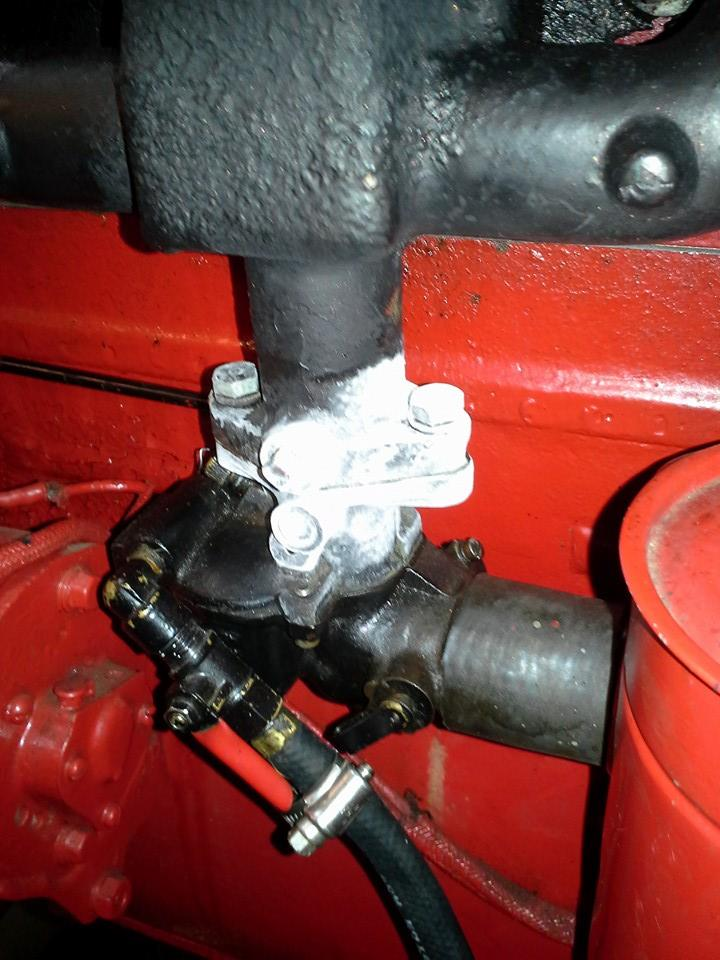
Zenith 161X7 updraft carburetor on a 1948 International Harvester Super A tractor

Zenith Carburetor (later the Fuel Devices Division of Bendix Corporation) was an American manufacturer of gasoline engine management systems and components, chiefly carburetors and filters. It was founded in Detroit, Michigan in 1911 as a subsidiary of the French Société du carburateur Zénith.

Carburetors in most cases were replaced by fuel injection systems, also provided by Bendix, during the 1970s.

== Anthony Messina ==
The design of the Zenith was perfected around 1889-1903 by Anthony Messina of Rhinelander, Wisconsin. The carburetor had two jets, one for rich mixture, one for lean. The mixture was then combined in the right proportions for the engine's speed and load.

The Zenith design won first prize in a competition with 14 others organized by the Royal Prussian War Ministry in 1903.

== Ford ==
Zenith's product was one of a small number of different carburetors used on the Ford Model T. It was also fitted to most of the 4.8 million Ford Model A cars built from 1927 to 1931) -- reportedly 3.5 million of them. An enhanced Zenith carburetor was supplied for the Ford Model B, but also popular as a retrofit for the Ford Model A engine.

== Harley-Davidson ==
Their big twin motorcycles were fitted with Zenith carburetors.

== Farm tractors ==
Zenith carburetors were also standard equipment on some International Harvester Farmall tractors, such as the Zenith 161X7 on the Farmall Super A. They were also found on farm and heavy machinery applications from Allis-Chalmers and others.

== Other applications ==
Zenith carburetors were also found on aircraft and marine engines.
