= Tumble =

Tumble or tumbling may refer to:

== Arts and media ==
- Tumble (album), a 1989 album by Biota
- Tumble (TV series), a British TV series
- Tumble (video game), a 2010 Sony Interactive Entertainment video game
- "Tumble", a song by Meghan Trainor from the album Only 17
- Mr Tumble, a character on Something Special
- Tumble, a character in 40 Winks

== Other uses ==
- Tumbling (sport), a gymnastic sport
- Tumble, Carmarthenshire, a village in South Wales
  - Tumble RFC, a rugby union club
- A special case of Poinsot's ellipsoid, describing a form of chaotic rotation of an extended object

== See also ==
- Tumble finishing, a technique for smoothing and polishing the surface on small parts
- Tumbler (disambiguation)
