= Heuberger Sizzler =

Low-wing, tricycle gear, homebuilt aircraft

General information
- Type: Homebuilt aircraft
- National origin: United States of America
- Designer: Lawrence K. Hueberger

History
- First flight: 18 September 1957

The Heuberger Sizzler is low-wing, tricycle gear, homebuilt aircraft that was designed by Continental Air Lines engineer Larry Heuberger.

== Design and development ==
The prototype Sizzler was started in November 1956

The Sizzler is almost a T-tail arrangement with a small amount of vertical stabilizer protruding. It is mostly aluminium construction with flush riveting. The Sizzler uses a fiberglass cowling and wing fairings. The front spar is from an Ercoupe and the nose gear is modified from a Cessna 180 tail wheel.

== Variants ==
- Heuberger Sizzler
  Heuberger Sizzler II

Widened for two seats side-by-side, integrated leading edge wet-wing and larger stabilizer

== Specifications (Sizzler) ==
Data from Sport Aviation, Air Trails

General characteristics

- Crew: one
- Capacity: one passenger
- Length: 20 ft 7 in (6.27 m)
- Wingspan: 18 ft 4 in (5.59 m)
- Wing area: 100 sq ft (9.3 m^{2})
- Airfoil: NACA 63-210
- Empty weight: 900 lb (408 kg)
- Gross weight: 1,350 lb (612 kg)
- Fuel capacity: 33 U.S. gallons (120 L; 27 imp gal)
- Powerplant: 1 × Lycoming O-290-D , 125 hp (93 kW)
- Propellers: 2-bladed

Performance

- Maximum speed: 160 kn (180 mph, 290 km/h)
- Cruise speed: 135 kn (155 mph, 249 km/h)
- Stall speed: 59 kn (68 mph, 109 km/h)
- Range: 520 nmi (600 mi, 970 km)
- Service ceiling: 14,000 ft (4,300 m)

== See also ==
- Heuberger Doodle Bug
