= Ford Model T engine =

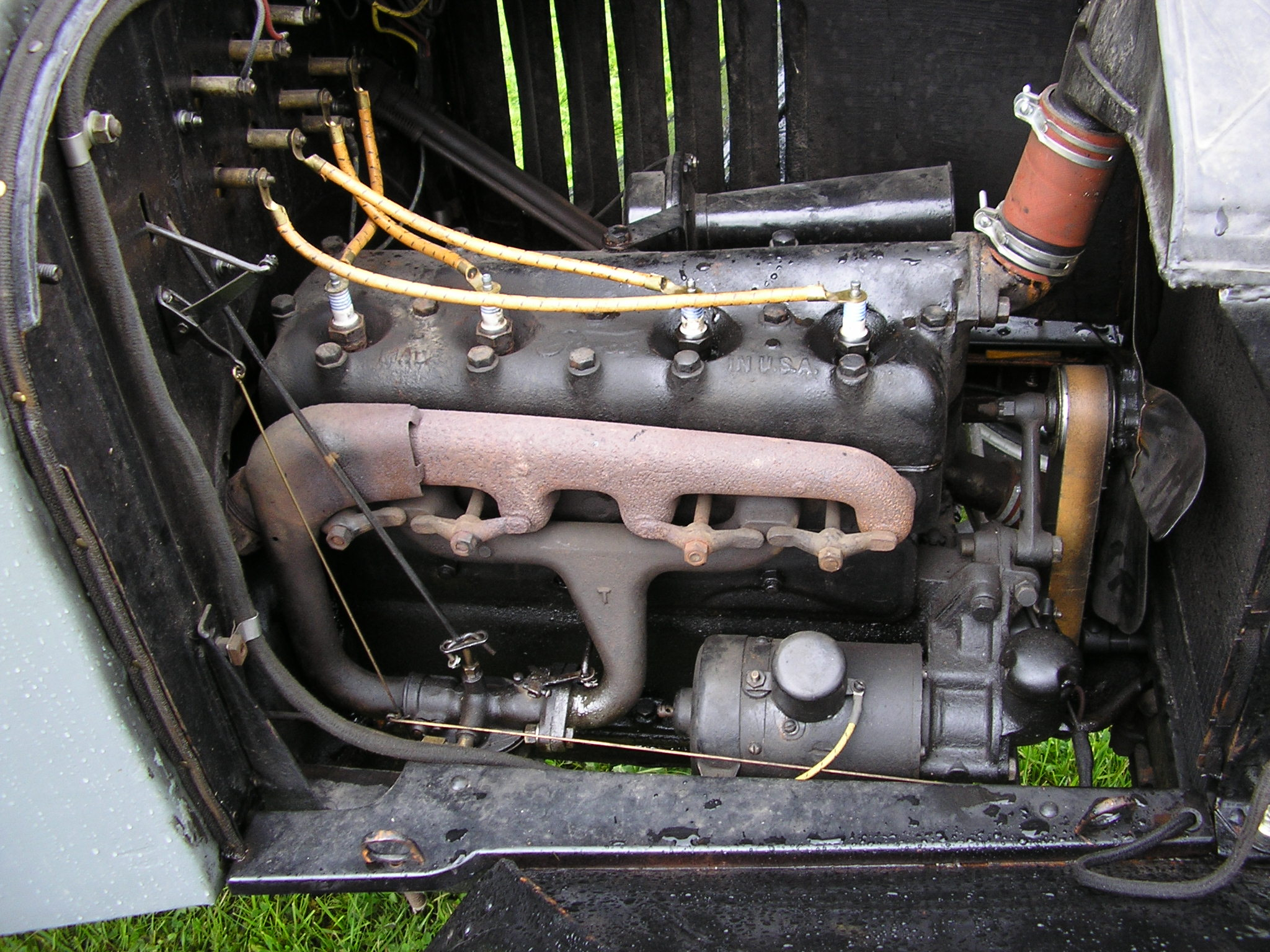

Overview
- Manufacturer: Ford Motor Company
- Production: 1908–1941

Layout
- Configuration: Inline-4
- Displacement: 177 cu in (2.9 L)
- Cylinder bore: 3 3/4 in (95.25 mm)
- Piston stroke: 4 in (101.6 mm)
- Cylinder block material: Cast iron, monobloc design
- Cylinder head material: Cast iron, detachable
- Valvetrain: Side valve (flathead)
- Compression ratio: 3.98:1

Combustion
- Fuel system: Gravity feed, Holley, Kingston and Zenith carburettors
- Fuel type: gasoline
- Cooling system: Water-cooled, thermosyphon

Output
- Power output: 20 hp (14.9 kW)

Chronology
- Predecessor: None
- Successor: Ford Model A engine

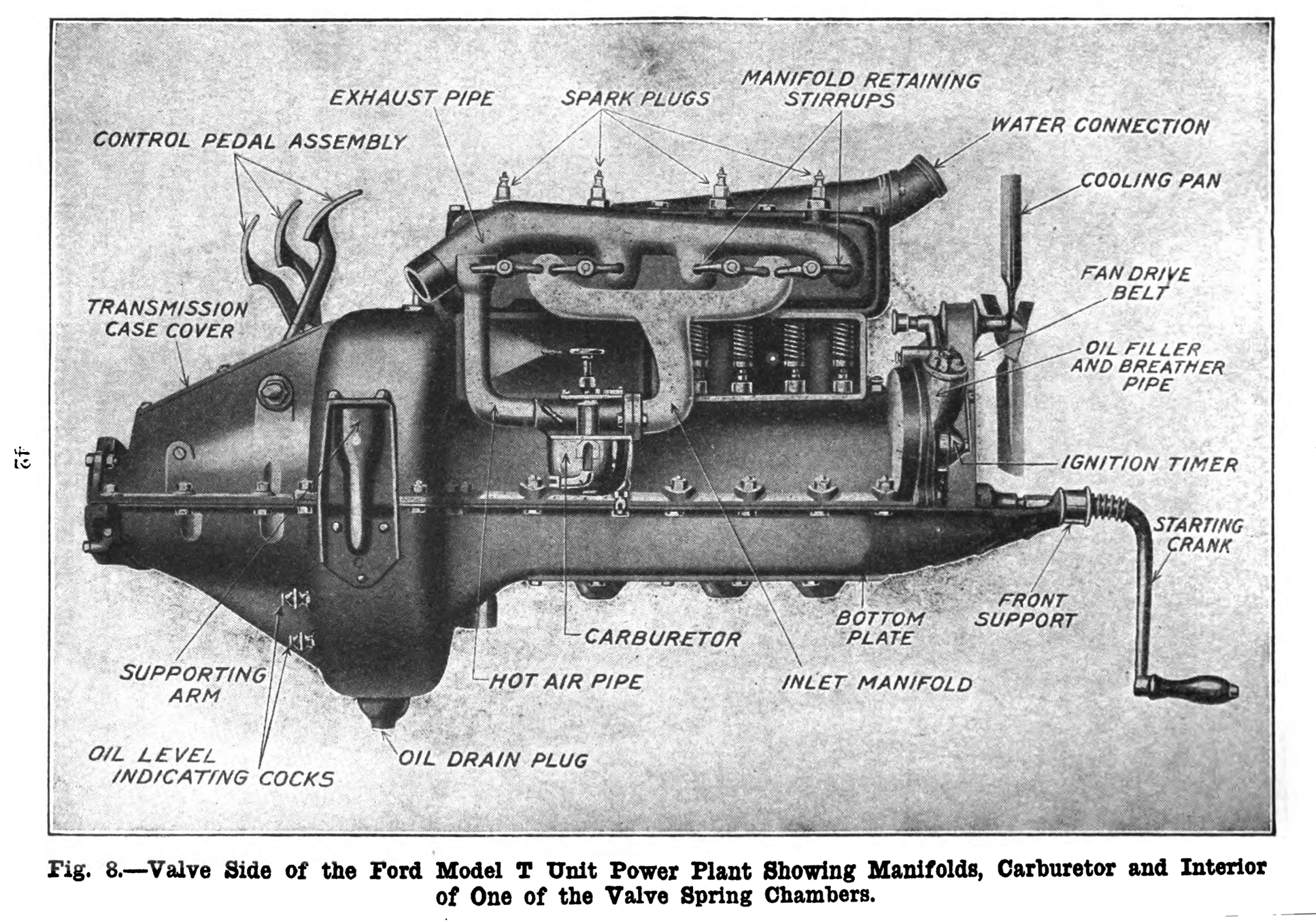
Side view of the Ford Model T engine.

The Ford Model T used a 177 cu in (2.9 L) sidevalve, inline 4-cylinder engine. It was primarily a gasoline engine. It produced 20 hp (14.9 kW) for a top speed of 45 mph (72 km/h). It was built in-unit with the Model T's novel transmission (a planetary design), sharing the same lubricating oil.

The T engine was known for its simplicity, reliability, and economy. The engine remained in production for many years, and millions of units were produced. The engine design's lifespan exceeded that of the Model T vehicle itself, with industrial, marine, and military applications extending its production run. The T engine is on the Ward's 10 Best Engines of the 20th Century list.

== Fuel choices and fuel economy ==
The Model T engine was built as a gasoline engine. While not engineered specifically for multifuel ability, its simple, robust design allowed a modified engine to successfully run on a variety of combustible fuels including benzene, ethanol, or kerosene. According to Ford Motor Company, the Model T had fuel economy on the order of 13–21 mpg_{‑US} (16–25 mpg_{‑imp}; 18–11 L/100 km).

== Carburetor and fuel system ==
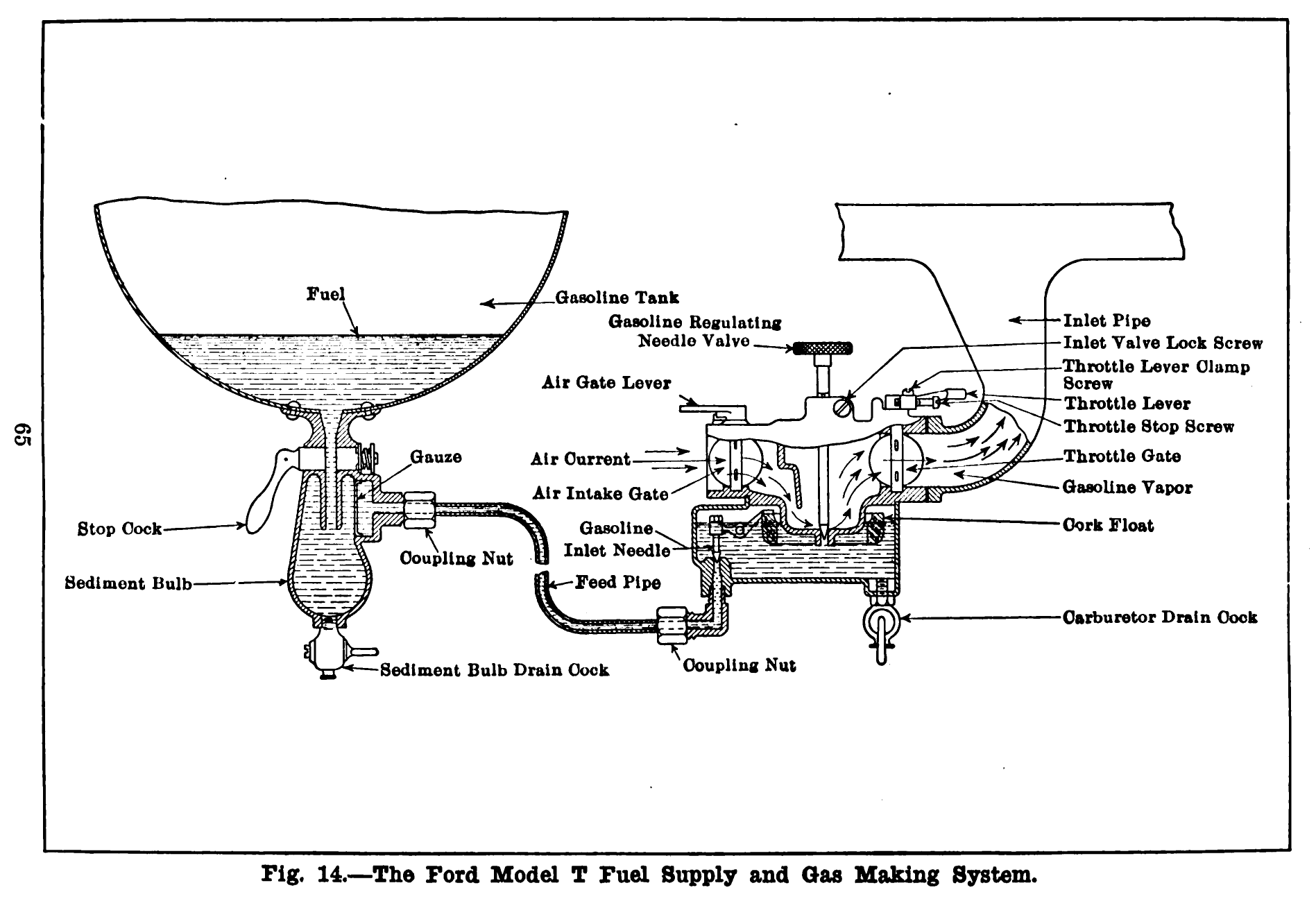
Cutaway view of the fuel system for the Ford Model T engine, showing the gravity-feed fuel supply, carburetor cutaway, and intake stream.

The Ford Model T engine had one carburetor, a side-draft, single-venturi unit. Its choke and throttle valves were controlled manually; the latter was with a hand lever rather than a foot pedal. The carburetor had no accelerator pump. Various vendors supplied Ford with carburetors for the T engine, including Holley, Zenith, and Kingston.

During most of the T's production run, its 10 US gal (38 L; 8 imp gal) fuel tank was mounted to the frame beneath the front seat. Because Ford relied on gravity to feed fuel to the carburetor rather than a fuel pump, a Model T could not climb a steep hill when the fuel level was low. The solution was to climb steep hills in reverse. In 1926, the fuel tank was moved forward and upward, under the cowl, behind the dashboard on most models, which improved the gravity feed. An aftermarket fuel pump was a common modification made to the Ford's original spartan engine design. Even by the standards of the day, the engine was in many ways a half-manufacture when it came to thermal efficiency and other running characteristics which could lengthen the unit's life span and improve the car as a whole. The Model T components were made to wide tolerances to accommodate manufacturing techniques of the day to produce reliable devices, and in making these components, the Ford Motor Company engineers used, from a modern perspective, extremely high levels of over tolerance to assure endurance of the end product.

Since it was up to the end-user to finish what Ford's assembly line left unfinished, the Ford Model T gave birth to the modern aftermarket performance engineering market. Later, with the introduction of the Model A Ford's flathead V8 in the early 30's, and their ease of availability in the post-war 1940's and early 1950's at a price that was within the reach of teenagers, mating one to a salvageable example of a Model T or a Model A lacking this eight cylinder engine gave birth to Hot Rod culture in the early 40's.

== Internal design ==
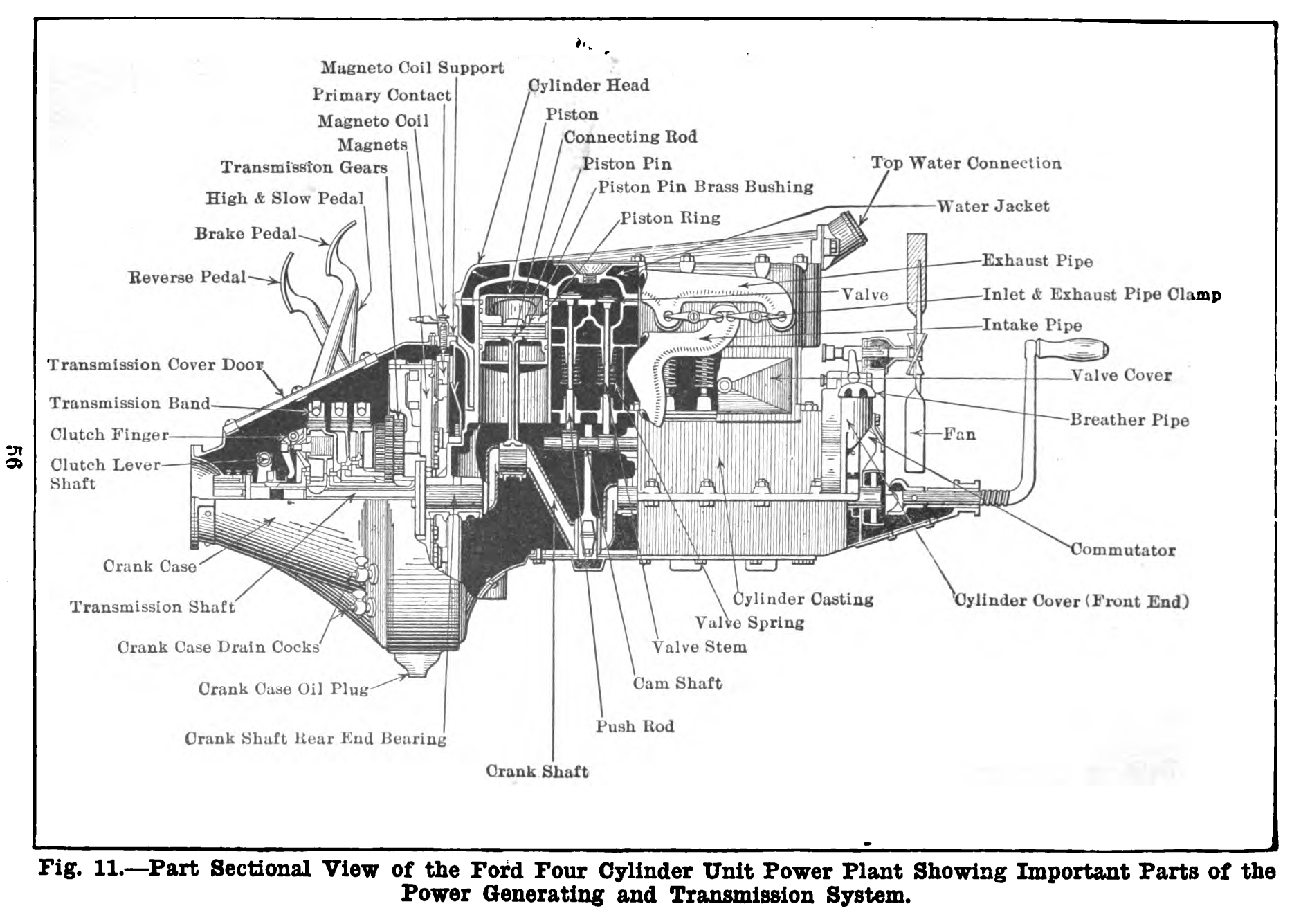
Cutaway internal view of the Ford Model T engine.

The T engine was an inline-four, with all four cylinders cast into one engine block. Such a monobloc design was an uncommon practice when T production started in 1908. It lent itself to mass production, showing the Ford company's prescient focus on design for manufacturability. The head, however, was detachable, which not only aided Ford in manufacturing but also made valve jobs (cleaning, grinding, or replacement of the poppet valves) easier. The block and head were both of cast iron.

The engine's bore was 3 3/4 inches (95.25 mm) and its stroke was 4 inches (101.6 mm) even, for a total displacement of 177 cu in (2.9 L). The compression ratio was 3.98 for most engines; early engines were slightly greater. This value is low by modern standards but was typical for the era, making the engine forgiving of poor-quality, low-octane fuel and minimizing cranking effort at starting.

The valvetrain was a side valve (flathead) design.

The crankshaft had three main bearings.

== Cooling system ==
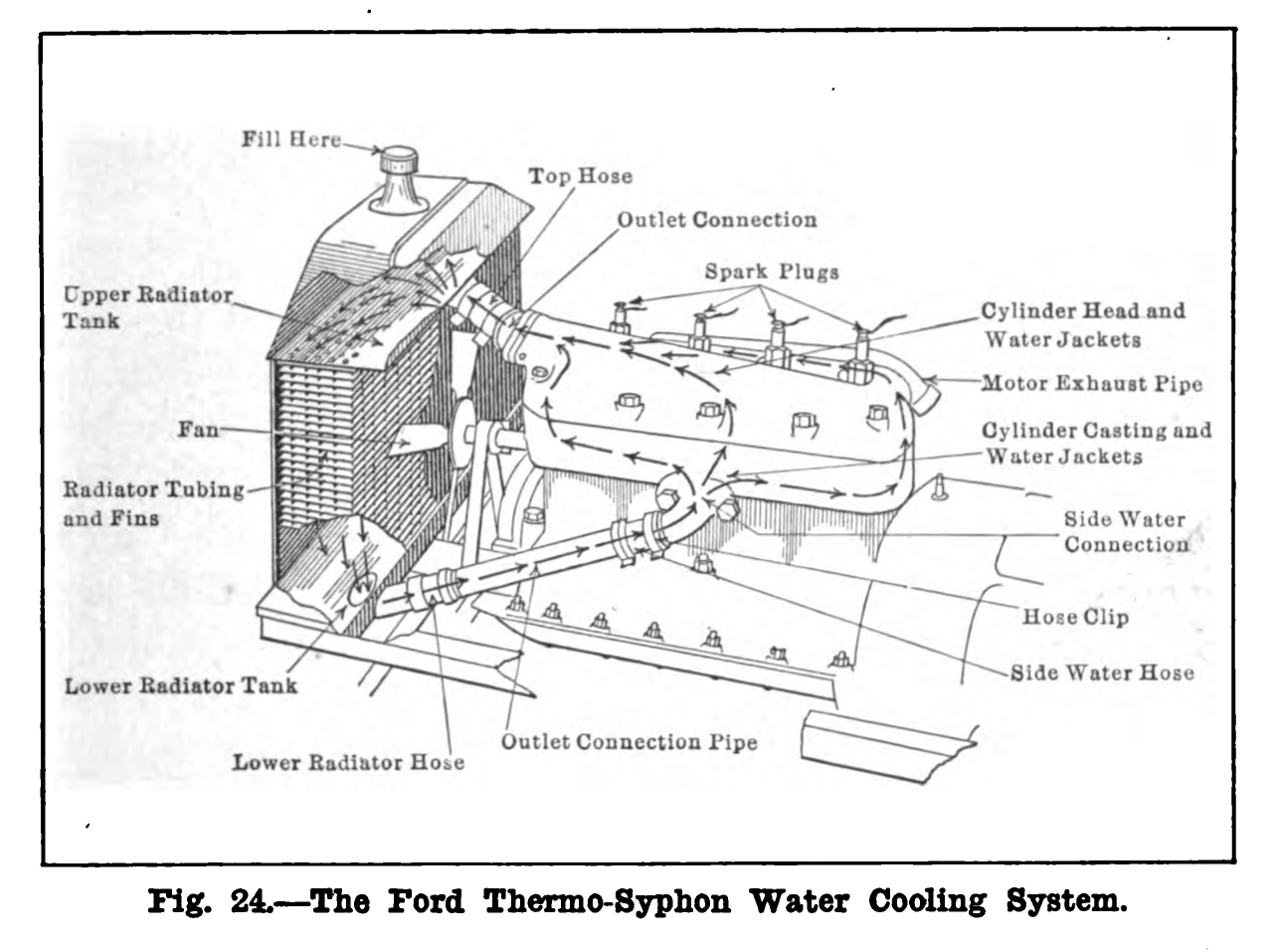
Overview of the thermosyphon cooling system of the Ford Model T engine.

The T engine's cooling system reflected the T's simplicity design theme. The first few hundred Model Ts had a water pump, but it was eliminated early in production. Instead, Ford opted for a cheaper and more reliable thermosyphon system. Thermosyphon was a common engine-cooling method of the era. Hot water, being less dense, would rise to the top of the engine and up into the top of the radiator, descending to the bottom as it cooled, and back into the engine. (This was the direction of water flow in most cars which did have water pumps, until the introduction of crossflow radiator designs.) The thermosiphon system was susceptible to overheating if worked heavily, but served well for most Model T usage.

Many types of water pumps were available as aftermarket accessories.

== Ignition system ==
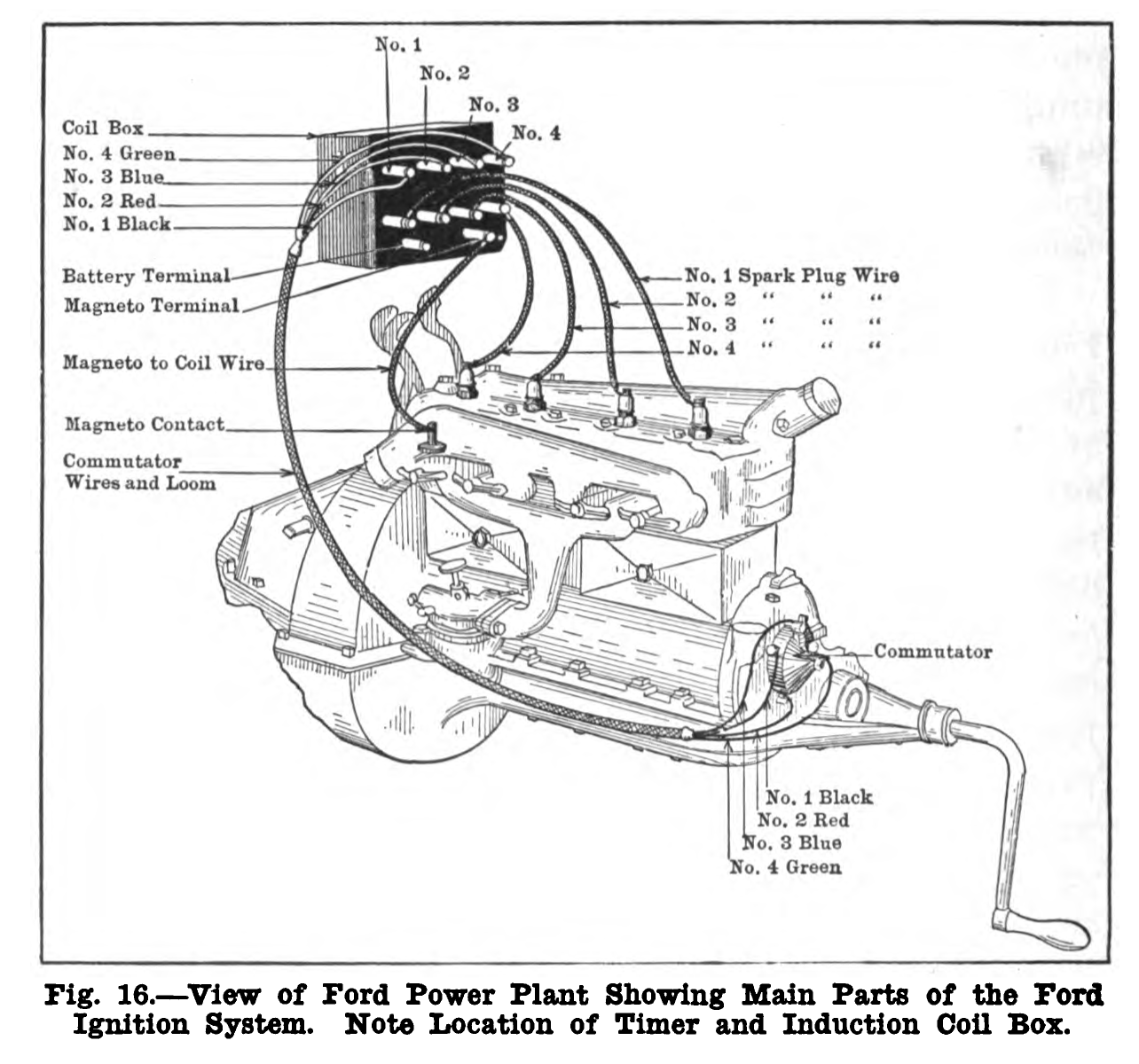
Overview of the ignition system of the Ford Model T engine.

The Model T engine's ignition system used a flywheel-mounted magneto to produce the current necessary to produce a spark to initiate combustion. This current was distributed by the timer (analogous to a distributor in a modern vehicle) to one of the four trembler coils, one for each cylinder. The coil stepped up the voltage and discharged it to the spark plug in the cylinder. Ignition timing was adjusted manually by using the spark advance lever mounted on the steering column, which rotated the timer, advancing or retarding the ignition timing. A certain amount of skill and experience was required to find the optimal spark timing for any speed and load.

The magneto was the first Model T component to be assembled on an assembly line, and the method was copied to many other Model T production segments. The ignition system of the Fordson tractor was similar to that of the Model T.

== Electrical system ==
In the early years of Model T production, all engines were started with a hand crank. A battery could be used to supply ignition current for starting, since it could be difficult to hand-crank a very cold engine fast enough for the magneto to produce sufficient current. However, although all Model T's had a "BAT" (battery) position on the coil box switch and a corresponding terminal on the box, Ford did not supply or even encourage the use of a battery before 1919, when it introduced a battery-driven electric starter. Even this was not standard equipment for all models until sometime in 1926, the last year of production.

Most cars sold after 1919 were equipped with this starter, which was engaged by a small round foot-operated button switch on the floor. These cars included a battery and a generator for recharging it. In keeping with the goal of reliability and simplicity, the trembler coil and magneto ignition system was retained even on cars with the starter system.

When electric headlights were introduced in 1915, the magneto was upgraded to supply enough power for the lights and horn. If a Model T had an electric starter equipped, the upgraded electrical system would also be used to supply power to these items.

== Operation ==
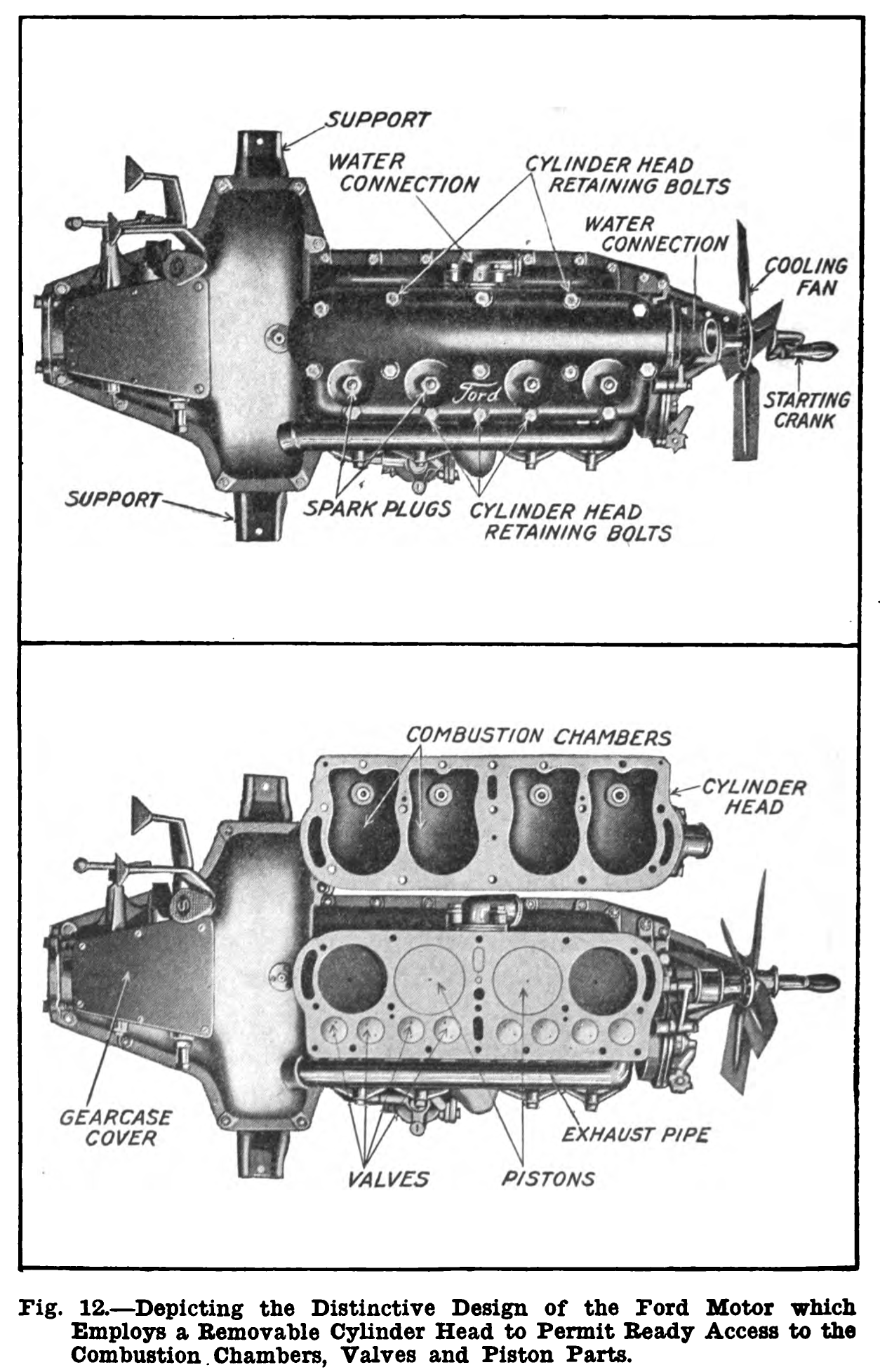
Overhead views of the Ford Model T engine, with the head removed in one view.

Operating the T engine was not difficult after some experience, although the learning curve was longer than today's. The various manual control tasks (such as manual choke and spark advance) and the method of use (such as hand throttle) were typical for automobiles of the era, although they might seem more like farm tractor operation to most automobile drivers of today.

Before starting a Model T with the hand crank, the spark had to be manually retarded or the engine might "kick back". The crank handle was cupped in the palm, with the thumb tucked under the handle (not clasped over top of it), so that if the engine did kick back, the rapid reverse motion of the crank would throw the hand away from the handle, rather than violently twisting the wrist or breaking the thumb. Most Model T Fords had the choke operated by a wire emerging from the bottom of the radiator where it could be operated with the left hand. This was used to prime the engine while cranking the engine slowly; then the engine was started with a rapid pull of the crank handle. In good tune, an already-primed T engine only has to be cranked half a turn for it to successfully start.

The T's planetary transmission is famous for its differences from what later became the norm for car transmission operation. The 3 foot pedals are not used in the way later cars use their pedals. Operation is not difficult but requires "unlearning" habits used with later vehicles.

== Design changes over the years ==
The following major changes were made (listed by year):

- 1909: First model year. Water pump was discontinued; subsequent Model T engines used thermosyphoning to circulate the coolant.
- 1911: Valve covers were added.
- 1917: Higher head with larger water jacket.
- 1919: Engine starter introduced as an option.
- 1920: Lighter-weight rods and pistons.
- 1922: The cylinder casting was changed so a single valve cover could be used.
- 1926: An extra boss was added at the rear for two additional bolts stiffening the transmission.
- 1927: The carburetor throttle rod was re-routed over the engine.

== Production run ==
The T engine was produced continuously from September 27, 1908, through August 4, 1941, exactly 12,000 days. This makes it one of the longest engines in series production, especially considering that the specifications remained mostly unchanged for this entire duration. Its production run for the U.S. consumer market for passenger cars and pickups was shorter, being the 19 years' production run of the Model T itself for that market (1908 to 1927). But the engine continued to be produced and sold to various consumer, industrial, military, and marine markets throughout the world until 1941.

== Ford Model A engine ==
The engine used in the Model A was a water-cooled L-head inline four with a displacement of 201 cu in (3.3 L). This engine provided 40 hp (30 kW; 41 PS), but made substantially more torque, at 128 lb⋅ft (174 N⋅m) of torque. The bore and stroke were also enlarged from the original Model T's engine; measuring 3.9 in (99 mm) x 4.3 in (110 mm). There are no interchangeable parts between the Model T and Model A engines.

== See also ==
- List of Ford engines
- Pietenpol Sky Scout, a 1929-designed homebuilt aircraft using a Model T engine

== Bibliography ==
- Pagé, Victor Wilfred (1916), The Model T Ford car, its construction, operation and repair, New York, New York, USA: Norman W. Henley, LCCN 18002807. Subtitle "A complete practical treatise explaining the operating principles of all parts of the Ford automobile, with complete instructions for driving and maintenance."
