= Doodle Bug scooter =

Vintage motor scooter

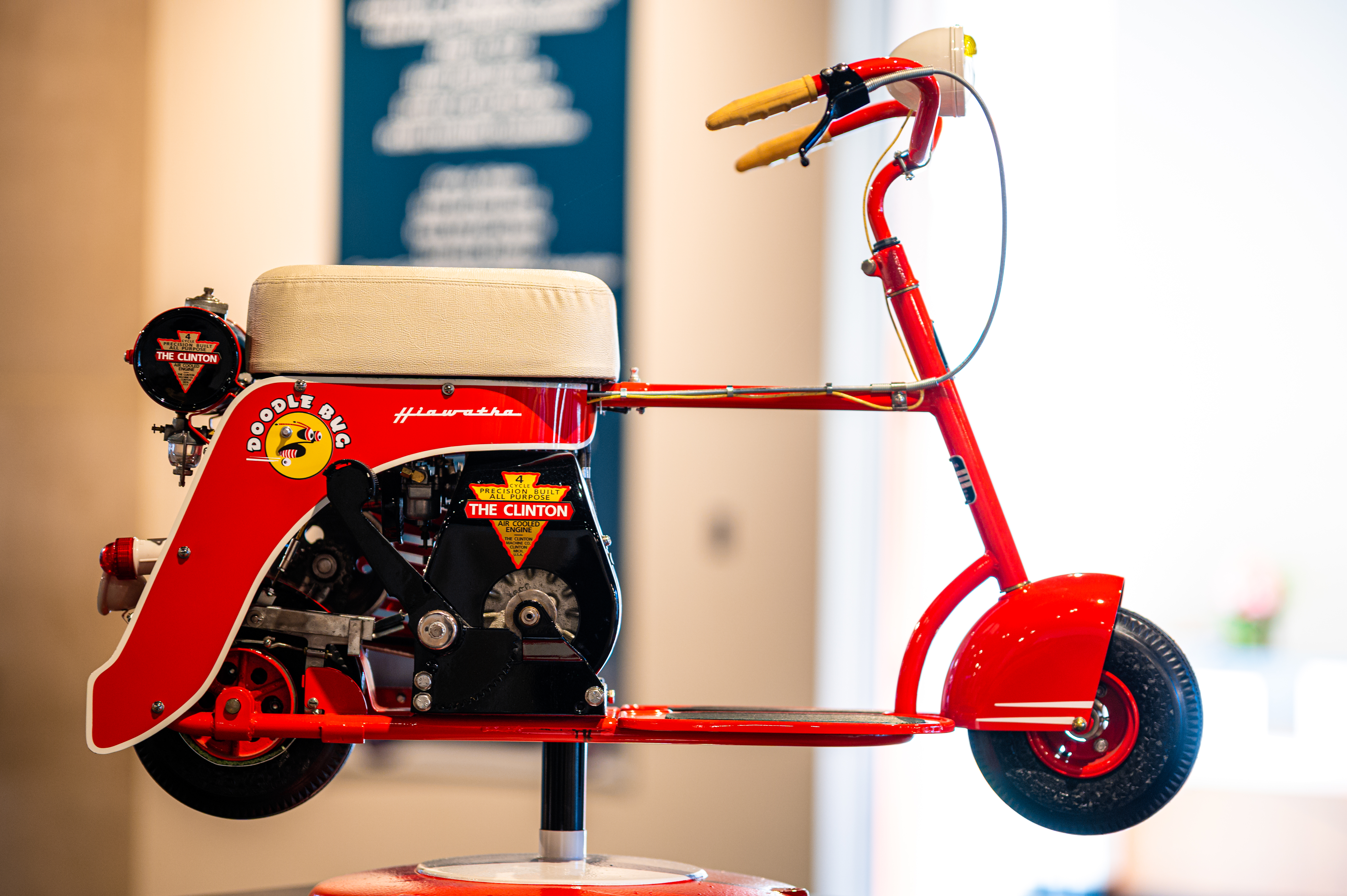
A Doodle Bug scooter in the Crawford Auto-Aviation Museum

The Doodle Bug was a motor scooter built from 1946 to 1948 by the Beam Manufacturing Company of Webster City, Iowa, US. They were sold through the Gambles store chain to compete against Cushman scooters being sold under the Allstate brand by Sears. Gambles sold the Doodle Bug under the "Hiawatha" name.

Doodle Bugs were powered by 1½ hp engines from Briggs & Stratton or Clinton. The Doodle Bug Standard Model B was the only Doodle Bug series powered by Clinton engines; one thousand or less of these were built, all during the first production run of ten thousand scooters. All other Doodle Bug scooters, including the Standard Model A that was produced alongside the Model B during the first production run, used variants of the Briggs & Stratton NP engine. Four production runs of ten thousand scooters each were built.

An annual reunion of Doodle Bug owners and restorers is held in Webster City.
