= Wiley Post Model A =

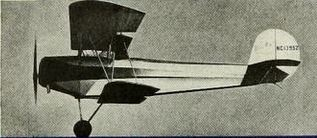

General information
- Type: two seat sports biplane
- National origin: United States
- Manufacturer: Wiley Post Aircraft
- Designer: Ross Holmes and Glenn Stearman
- Number built: about 13

History
- First flight: 1934
- Developed from: Straughn A

The Wiley Post Model A is a U.S. two seat sports biplane, built in small numbers in the 1930s.

== Design and development ==
The 1934 Model A biplane is a development of the Straughn A, designed by Ross Holmes and Glenn Stearman in 1931 and originally built as a parasol wing monoplane but converted to a biplane before Straughn Aircraft were subsumed by Wiley Post Aircraft. Three were built.

Little changed from its predecessor, the Wiley Post Model A is an unequal span, single bay biplane with significant stagger. Its two-spar wings are rectangular in plan apart from blunted tips and are built from spruce and mahogany plywood with aircraft fabric covering. The lower wings are shorter in chord as well as span, so the outward-leaning, N-form interplane struts are non-parallel. Outward-leaning struts from the fuselage support the upper wing, which has a narrow trailing edge cut-out to improve the pilot's upward field of view. Ailerons are mounted only on the upper wings.

The fuselage has a Cr/Mo steel tube structure and is fabric-covered. Its engine is a Straughn 1000, an adaptation of the 40 hp (30 kW) unit used in the Ford A car with its radiator under the upper wing centre-section. The open cockpit under the upper wing trailing edge cut-out seats two side by side with dual controls. Its wire-braced, rounded tail is conventional, built with the same structure as the fuselage. Control surfaces are not aerodynamically balanced.

The Model A has conventional, fixed landing gear with mainwheels on split axles hinged the fuselage centre-line. Vertical landing legs, with rubber cord shock absorbers, and their drag struts are mounted on the lower fuselage longerons. There is a leaf-spring tailskid mounted just ahead of the rudder post.

== Operational history ==
Production numbers are uncertain but are thought to be about 13. A few airframes survived into the 1970s, with one in restoration.

== Aircraft on display ==
- Model A NC13961 (c/n 12), Science Museum Oklahoma, Oklahoma City

== Specifications ==
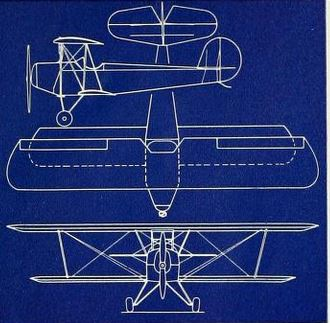

Data from Aero Digest, April 1935

General characteristics

- Crew: one
- Capacity: one student or passenger
- Length: 19 ft 9 in (6.02 m)
- Upper wingspan: 28 ft 6 in (8.69 m)
- Lower wingspan: 24 ft 6 in (7.47 m)
- Height: 7 ft 8 in (2.34 m)
- Wing area: 206 sq ft (19.1 m^{2})
- Empty weight: 581 lb (264 kg)
- Gross weight: 998 lb (453 kg)
- Fuel capacity: 7 US gal (5.8 imp gal; 26 L)
- Powerplant: 1 × Straughn AL-1000 (Ford model 1A) upright, water-cooled four cylinder inline, 40 hp (30 kW)
- Propellers: 2-bladed Stone

Performance

- Maximum speed: 80 mph (130 km/h, 70 kn)
- Cruise speed: 70 mph (110 km/h, 61 kn)
- Landing speed: 25 mph (40 km/h; 22 kn)
- Service ceiling: 10,000 ft (3,000 m)
- Rate of climb: 600 ft/min (3.0 m/s)
