= Speedex Tractors =

Tractor manufacturers of the United States

Speedex Tractors were a line of small garden tractors produced in various factories in Ohio between 1935 and 2000.

== Early years ==
Harold Pond, along with his brother Elmer and brother in law, Glen Heilman all worked for Shaw Manufacturing of Galesburg, Kansas, a company which produced walk-behind tractors. Harold was assigned the territory of Ohio and Pennsylvania. In 1935, Pond left to form the Pond tractor company and began producing Speedex walk-behind tractors.

Harold Pond developed the Model B Speedex Riding tractor in 1938. Pond set up a head office in the town of Ravenna, in Portage County, Ohio. The Model B would become known as the first four-wheel garden tractor in America. It had an air cooled engine and pneumatic tires. The Model B tractors were produced and sold from 1938 to 1948. The engine was Briggs & Strattion Model ZZ Gas Engine. The tractors included a Ford Model A Transmission and a Ford Model T Rear Axle. This tractor had tiller steering with a single stick that would move forward and backward to control the steering gear.

In addition to the Model B, Pond also produced a Model A and Model C Walk Behind tractor.

In 1942, Pond developed a Model FG (Farm and Garden) tractor. This model would use a Ford Model A Four-cylinder engine, a Ford Model A Transmission and a Ford Model T rear axle. Early models were distinguished by the Shiny Chrome Ford Radiator. Later models were higher with a painted radiator.

Pond was contacted in 1948 by Ford who told Pond that the Pond Tractor company was competing with Ford's own tractor line and that he would no longer be able to purchase Ford components for his tractors. As a result, Pond developed his own line of transmissions and rear axles for his tractors.

In 1949, Pond renamed his company to the Speedex Tractor Company. A name that would carry through with the production of tractors until 2000 when the last Speedex tractor was produced.

After the changes were made to the transmissions and axles, Pond began selling the M-23 and M-25. In addition, other changes were made to the Walk-Behind tractors that were being sold by the company.

Pond sold the Speedex Tractor Company in 1957. New owners Maury Foote and Jerry Stowe were from other backgrounds but would develop the S-Series line of Speedex Tractors. The S-Series would become the most widely sold models of the Speedex Company and many are still in existence in 2015.

== S-Series ==
The first S-Series tractors were produced starting in 1959 and would be made with the same basic concepts being used until 1974. In 1959, the S-14 and S-23 were made available for purchase. These tractors incorporated the earlier changes from the transmission and axle designs of Harold Pond in 1951. However, a steering wheel and steel hoods were added to these tractors. A full line of accessories had been developed and was carried over to the S-Series.

In 1960, a mowing deck with its own Engine was manufactured for the S-Series. This model attached to the front of the tractor and made the S-Series the first Four Wheel Riding Lawn Mower in America.

The models S-14, S-17, S-18, S-19, S-23, S-24, and S-32 were to be produced throughout the years. The model number of the tractor initially begin directly corresponding to the model number of the Briggs and Stratton engines that were being used on the tractors. In 1968, Kohler gas engines began being available on certain models.

Production of the S-Series reached approximately 1000 units per year and remained stable until the company was sold in 1969.

== The new models ==
In 1969, the General Combustion company, which later merged with Mechtron International, boosted to over 1500 units per year. In this time, the First fully floating mower deck was manufactured. As the years progressed, a newer style frame and model line would be introduced. The 832 was a small frame tractor with a diesel engine.

In March 1969, the Eagle Tractor Company purchased the company. Models such as the Falcon and Eagle began production. These models were targeted as the yard mowing consumer Speedex models. These models were comparable to models being produced by many companies and being sold in hardware and retail stores around America. As a whole, these models were not considered as reliable as the heavier line of tractors that Speedex had been producing.

After 1974, The S-Series models were replaced with a Four Digit model system. Models such as the 1430, 1431, 1432, 1630, 1631, and 1632 were produced during the 70's and 80's As the models progressed, a 3-point attachment system would be developed. Older models came with hydraulics for lifting and hydraulic brakes.

Production of Speedex tractors continued in the Ravenna, Ohio facility until 1994. This facility was eventually closed all models moved out of the factory. This factory remains today and is owned by a private owner.

The Armstrong Tractor Company again started production of Speedex Tractors. This company was based in Armstrong, PA. The company only produced tractors with the Speedex name for a short period before changing the name of the tractors to Strongland. Armstrong continued production of the tractors in the same basic design as the Speedex Tractors and continued producing parts and accessories for owners of the Speedex line of tractors.

In 1997, Speedex Tractor Company was acquired by Trans Tech International in Bolivar, Ohio. The last USA Made Speedex tractor was made in 1999 when the Speedex Tractor company introduced the Model 2032. Only a handful of 2032's were ever produced. The Speedex Tractor company is still in existence but, tractors are no longer in production.

Speedex tractors are sought after by collectors, and some of them have formed the Speedex Collectors' Club. The older models are sometimes displayed at agricultural events and festivals.
