= Heuberger Doodle Bug =

General information
- Type: Homebuilt aircraft
- National origin: United States of America
- Designer: Lawrence K. Hueberger

History
- First flight: December 1954

The H-1 Doodle Bug is a single place homebuilt aircraft designed in the 1950s by Continental Airlines DC-6 pilot Lawrence K. Heuberger.

== Design and development ==
The prototype was designed and built in Heuberger's garage in El Paso. Heuberger marketed plans of the aircraft for homebuilt construction.

The Doodlebug is a low wing, conventional geared aircraft. The wings are partially flush riveted. The fuselage is fabric covered welded steel tube, with wooden stringers. The firewall mounted fuel tank holds 12.5 gallons of fuel, with 25 gallons capacity with tip tanks.

== Specifications (Heuberger Doodle Bug) ==
Data from Aerofiles, Air Trails

General characteristics

- Capacity: 1
- Length: 16 ft 6 in (5.03 m)
- Wingspan: 18 ft (5.5 m)
- Height: 4 ft 5 in (1.35 m)
- Wing area: 68 sq ft (6.3 m^{2})
- Airfoil: NACA 64-210
- Empty weight: 616 lb (279 kg)
- Gross weight: 970 lb (440 kg)
- Fuel capacity: 12.5
- Powerplant: 1 × Continental C-90-14F , 90 hp (67 kW)
- Propellers: 2-bladed

Performance

- Maximum speed: 171 kn (197 mph, 317 km/h)
- Cruise speed: 150 kn (173 mph, 278 km/h)
- Stall speed: 61 kn (70 mph, 110 km/h)
- Range: 610 nmi (700 mi, 1,100 km)
- Service ceiling: 16,000 ft (4,900 m)

== See also ==
- Heuberger Sizzler
