= Tumbler =

Tumbler may refer to:

- Tumbler (comics), a Marvel Comics character
- Tumbler (firearms), a part of the firing mechanism in older firearms
- Tumbler (glass), a type of glassware
- Tumbler (pigeon), a pigeon breed
- Tumbler (Project Xanadu), a unique identifier of a unit of text or an embedded link
- Tumbler, a machine for tumble polishing solid material
- Tumbler, a participant in tumbling
- Tumbler, part of a lock
- Tumbler, an obsolete name for a porpoise
- Tumbler, a character in Bob the Builder
- "Tumbler (Hot & Cold)", a song by Candy Shop from Girls Don't Cry
- The tumbler, a British culinary measurement unit
- The Tumbler, a 1968 album by John Martyn
- The Tumbler (Batmobile), a prototype military vehicle used by Batman in The Dark Knight Trilogy
- Compost tumbler, a tumbler for composting
- Cryptocurrency tumbler, a service to mix and anonymize cryptocurrency
- Tumbler toy or roly-poly toy, a type of toy that can tumble over and then straighten up by itself

== See also ==
- Tumble dryer, for drying clothes
- Tumblr, an internet microblogging and social networking platform
- List of tumblers (small Solar System bodies)
