= Doodlebug tractor =

US World War II home-made tractor

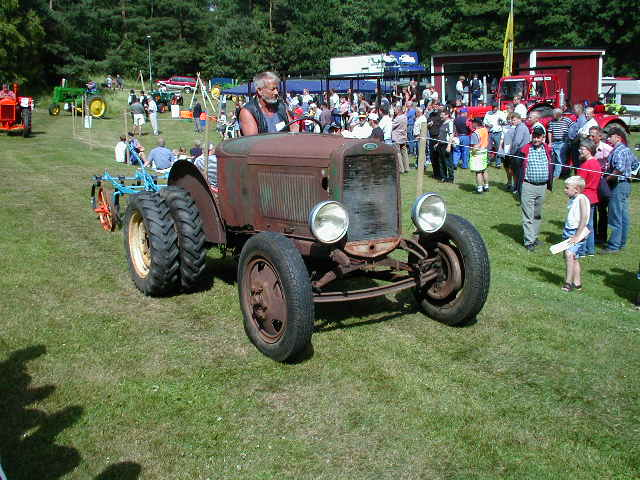
Model A Ford converted to a tractor

Doodlebug tractor is the colloquial American English name for a tractor home-made in the United States during World War II, when production tractors were in short supply. The doodlebug of the 1940s was usually based on a 1920s or 1930s era Ford automobile which was then modified either by the complete removal or alteration of some of the vehicle body. The preservation of examples of the doodlebug tractor has become popular in New England and upstate New York where there are several clubs holding monthly meet-ups in the summer months to put their contraptions to the test by pulling large stone boats in a tractor pull.

== History ==
Doodlebugs had many names — Friday Tractors, Scrambolas, Jitterbugs, Field Crawlers, Ruxells and many others, as well as the most common, The DoodleBug, which was a nickname for the aftermarket tractor kit made by David Bradley, "The old DB". Initially, the idea of the homemade tractor came from several catalog and implement companies in the mid-1920s to the mid-1930s, such as New Deal, Minnesota-based tractor company offering low priced tractors during the New Deal era, Peru Plow Co., Thrifty Farmer (offering Ford or Chevrolet auto to tractor conversions), Sears Roebuck & Co., Montgomery Ward, Pull Ford, and Johnson Mfg. Co.

The conversion kits were expensive, some as much as $300, and farmers, hit hard by the Great Depression were a resourceful lot. Magazines like Popular Mechanics and Mechanix Illustrated provided instructions for building a "Handy Henry" from that "old Ford sitting in your back yard, using simple tools anyone would have". The cost to build a "Handy Henry" made from an old Model T car or truck was about $20, according to the 1936 edition of the Handy Man's Home Manual, and this provided a serviceable vehicle with rubber tires, a big truck rear end and two transmissions to make up for the gear reduction with which the kits came.

These doodlebugs were used to plow, make hay, haul logs, and pull out stumps. To do all this, the doodlebug needed good ground clearance for use in any conditions and climbing almost any terrain. For protection they had a hood, cowl radiator, a small seat, some had a small truck bed, and most had a hitching point with which to tow.

== Sweden ==
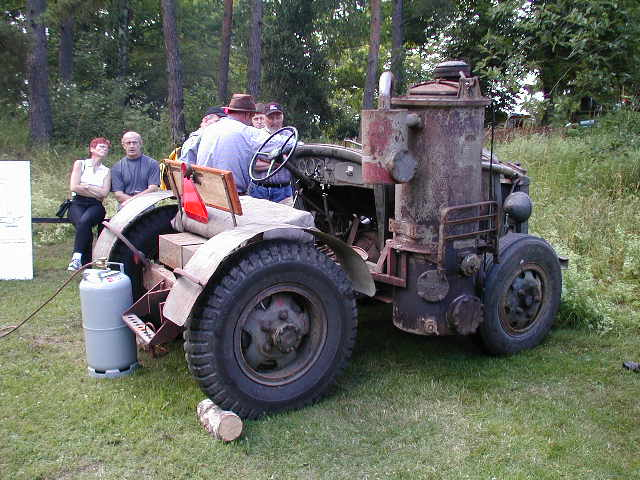
Swedish doodlebug based on a Model-A Ford, fitted with a wood gasifier to circumvent gasoline rationing during World War II.

In Sweden, tractors made from automobiles became popular among small farmers in the 1930s and remained so until small tractors became available in the 1950s. A government ordinance in 1940 (Kungörelse 1940: 440 om hänförande av vissa automobiler till fordonstypen motorredskap) was the first to set down rules for what modifications were necessary to change the class of vehicle from automobile to motorized farm implement, including a speed limit to 30 kilometers per hour (20 mph). Even though doodlebugs are no longer used for farming in Sweden, the age limit of 16 years (recently changed to 15 years) make them a popular hobby for teenagers in rural areas.

== See also ==
- Automobile-conversion tractors and other homemade versions
