= GAZ-AAA (4M) =

Soviet anti-aircraft truck

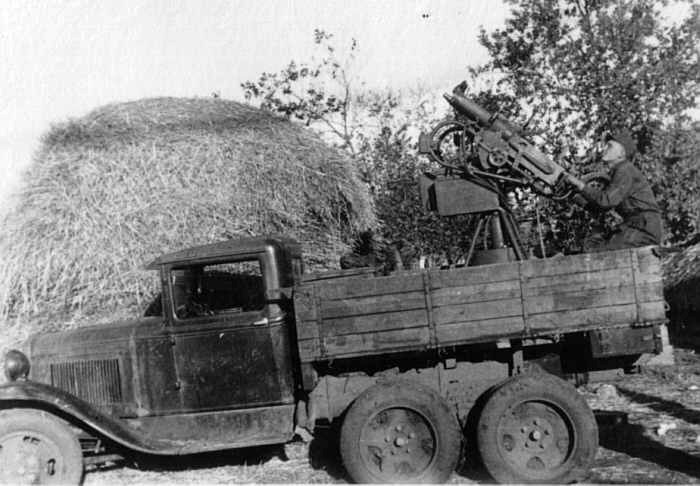
GAZ-AAA (4M)

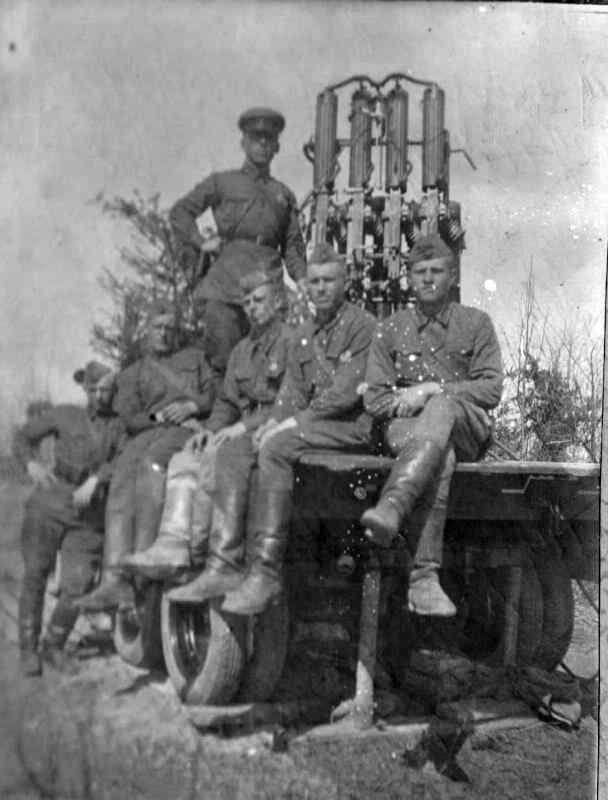
GAZ-AAA (4M)

The GAZ-AAA (4M) was a self-propelled anti-aircraft truck developed by the Soviet Union in 1938, based on the GAZ-AAA truck platform.

== History ==
In 1928, Fedor Tokarev developed a quad mount for the 7.62×54mmR PM M1910 machine gun for use as a light anti-aircraft weapon, which was adopted in 1938 as the 7.62mm M.1931 4M ZPU. The 4M ZPU was mounted on a GAZ-AAA truck to create a mobile AA weapon. While effective against low-flying targets due to the high rate of fire, this setup was only used as a stop-gap measure until more dedicated anti-aircraft weapons could be developed and fielded.

== Specifications (7.62 mm M.1931 4M ZPU) ==
- Crew 3 (Commander, Gunner & Loader)
- Elevation: -10° to +85°
- Traverse: 360°
- Gun Sight: Ring
- Gun Mount: Rotating metal frame
- Weight: 460 kg
- Rate of Fire: 2.400 r.p.m.
- Maximum Ceiling: 1.400 m
- Maximum Ground Range: 1.600 m

== Variants ==
Later versions of the anti-aircraft truck equipped the 12.7×108mm DShK machine gun.

The quad-Maxim mount was also used on the 4x2 GAZ-MM and GAZ-60 half-tracks.
