= GAZ-AAA =

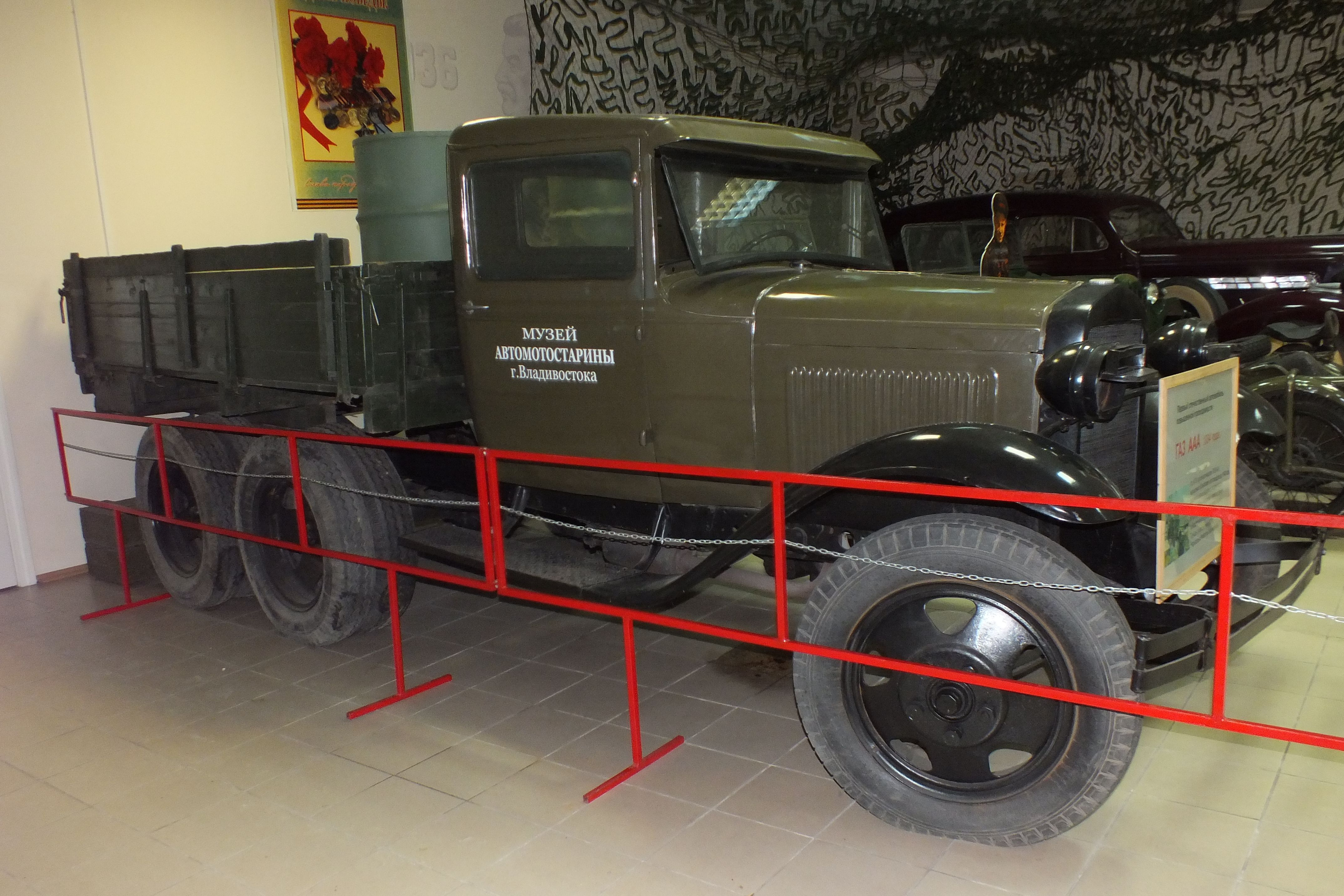

Overview
- Manufacturer: GAZ
- Production: 1936–1943
- Assembly: Soviet Union: Gorky

Body and chassis
- Class: Truck
- Layout: FR layout
- Related: GAZ-AA; GAZ-A

Powertrain
- Engine: 3.3 L GAZ-AAA I4
- Transmission: 4-speed manual

Dimensions
- Wheelbase: 3,440 mm (135.4 in)
- Length: 5,335 mm (210.0 in)
- Width: 2,040 mm (80.3 in)
- Height: 1,970 mm (77.6 in)
- Curb weight: 2,390 kg (5,269 lb)

The GAZ-AAA was a Soviet truck produced by GAZ. From 1936 to 1943, 37,373 units were built. Like the GAZ-AA and GAZ-MM, it was largely based on the Ford Model AA truck.

The GAZ-AAA involved several modifications to the previous GAZ-AA design. The most noticeable changes made, was a 6-wheeled base rather than the 4-wheeled original, as well as a modified chassis to fit the axle.

The GAZ-AAA saw service in World War II under The Red Army. The Red Army commonly used these trucks as anti-aircraft units, mounting either 4 7.62mm Maxim guns (as seen on the 4M variant), one 12.7mm DShK heavy machine gun, or a single 25mm 72-K autocannon.
