= Ford Model AA =

Heavy-duty version of the Ford Model A

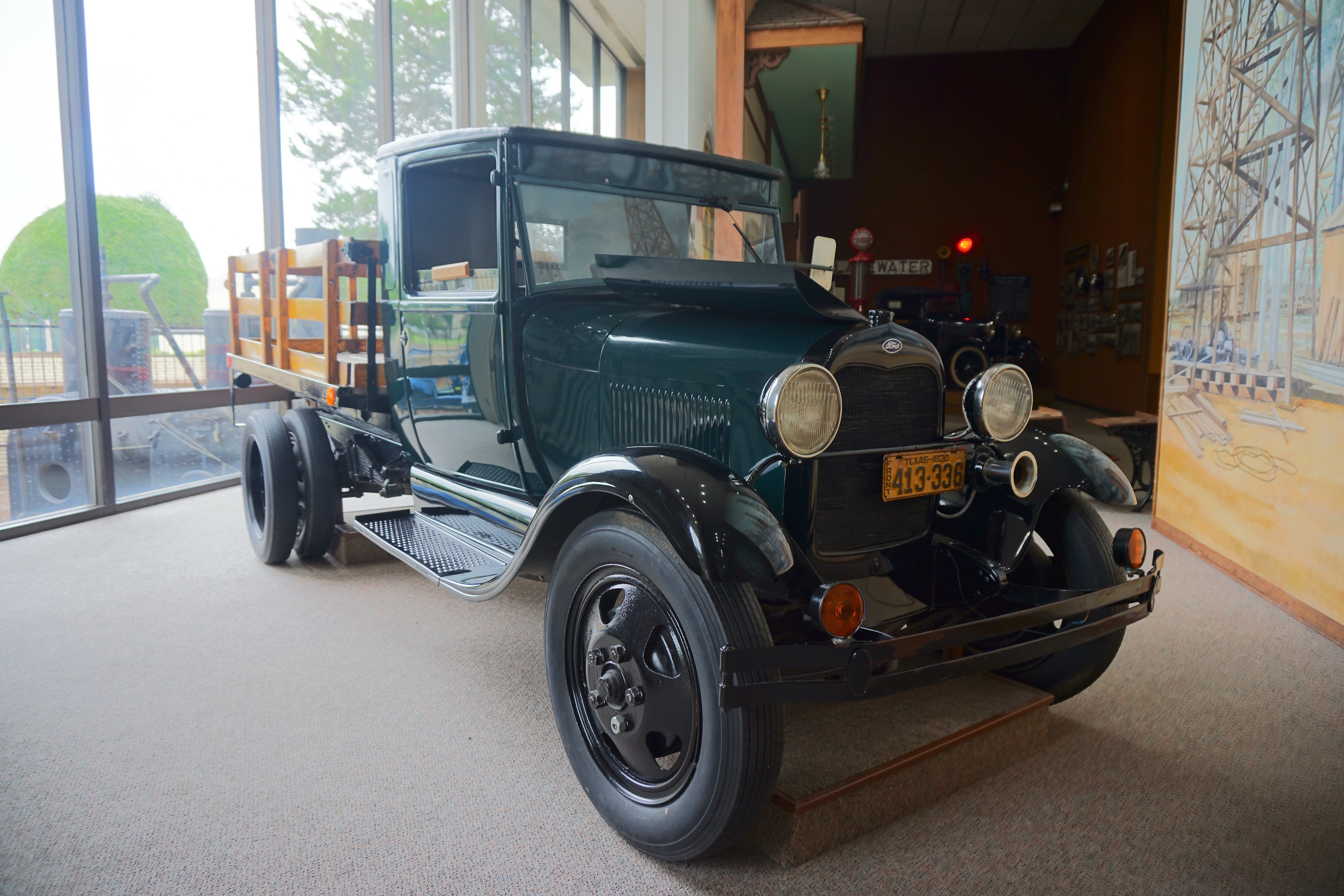
- Ford Model AA truck displayed in Kilgore, Texas East Texas Oil Museum

Overview
- Manufacturer: Ford
- Production: 1927–1932
- Designer: Henry Ford and Edsel Ford

Body and chassis
- Class: Medium commercial
- Body style: Chassis/Dual Chassis; Ambulance; Mail truck; Panel truck; Pickup; Deluxe pickup; Platform truck; Stake bed truck
- Related: Ford Model A GAZ-AA; GAZ-MM; GAZ-AAA

Powertrain
- Engine: 201 CID (3.3 L) 4-cylinder inline
- Transmission: 4-speed manual and reverse

Dimensions
- Wheelbase: 131 in (3,327 mm); 157.5 in (4,000 mm)
- Length: Varied by body style
- Width: 67 in (1,702 mm)
- Height: Varied by body style
- Curb weight: Varied by body style

Chronology
- Predecessor: Ford Model TT
- Successor: Ford Model BB; GAZ-AA

Ford Model AA is a truck from Ford. As the Model T and TT became obsolete and needed to be replaced, Henry Ford began initial designs on the Model A and Model AA in 1926. Basic chassis layout was done rapidly and mechanical development was moved forward quickly. Body design and style was developed and then outsourced to various body manufacturers, including Briggs and Murray. The designs of the Model A shared parts and materials with the Model AA Ford, notably the body, engine and interior. The AA usually received plainer interiors than their car counterparts. The Model AA followed similar design changes to the Model A during the AA's four years in production, often delayed anywhere from three to nine months. The mechanical changes and upgrades were done during production of the vehicles. Body changes that occurred between 1929 and 1930 were also integrated into AA production, but leftover parts were used longer in the heavy commercial trucks.

== Mechanical details ==
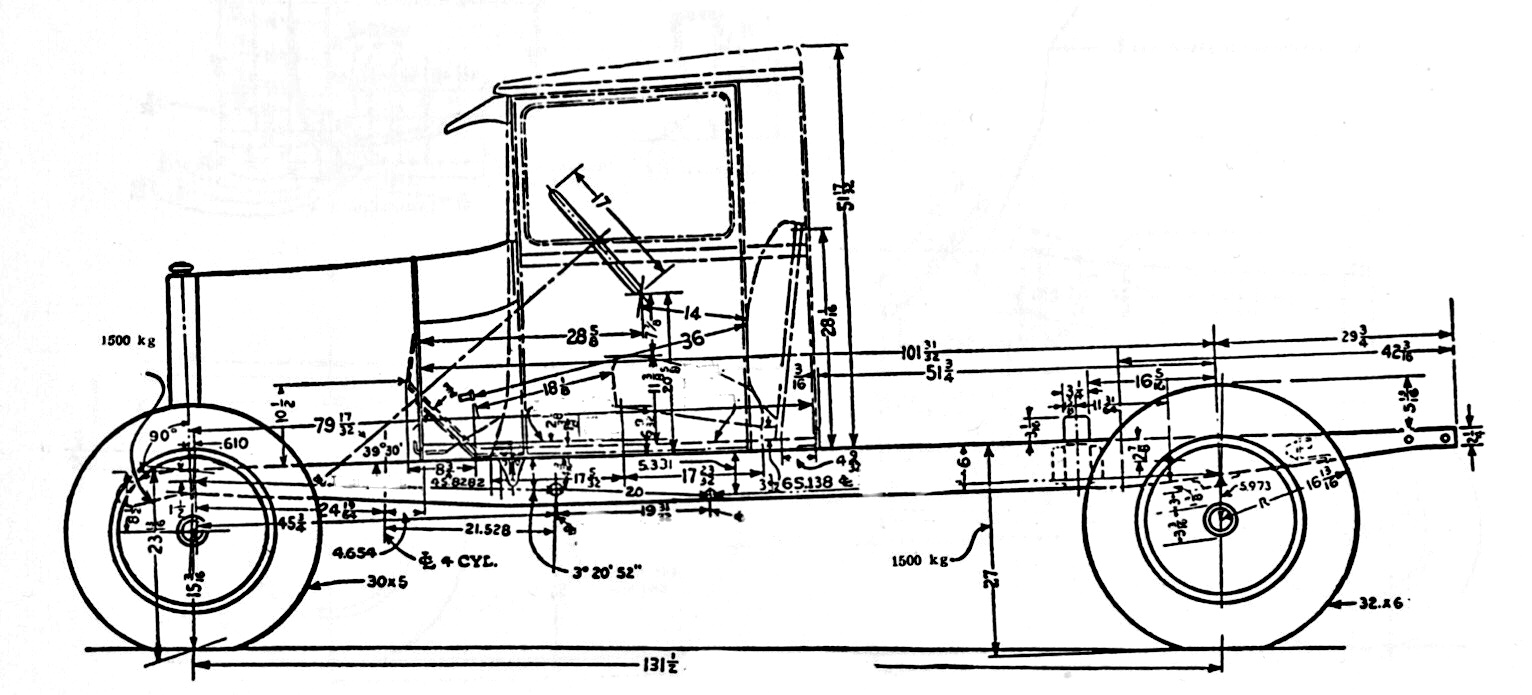
Ford AA Sketch with lengths

The Model AA Ford is powered by the same 201-cubic-inch (3.3 L) I4 engine that the Model A Ford used. The engine produced a maximum of 40 horsepower at 2,200 rpm. The engine featured an up-draft carburetor, six-volt generator, 2 and 4-blade fan, mechanical water pump, mechanical oil pump, electric starter and four-row radiator. All of these features were identical to the Model A Ford except the radiator. The engine could also be crank started if necessary by a hand crank that is inserted through a hole in the radiator shell. The Model AA was based on a chassis that was similar in design to the Model A Ford, except it was substantially larger and heavier to accommodate the work this truck was designed for.

The Model AA Ford has a four-speed manual gearbox. The additional gear in the transmission is a "granny" or "creeper" first gear with a higher reduction ratio than the first gear on a Model A Ford to provide more torque to move a loaded truck. The second through fourth gears on the Model AA transmission were similar ratios to the first through third gears on the Model A transmission. The Model AA transmission also featured a lock-out on the shift knob for reverse that required a lever to be activated with the thumb so reverse could be engaged. This was done to prevent accidental engagement of reverse while the truck was in motion. Early trucks had a worm gear rear-end that limited the top speed of the truck. That rear-end was replaced by a ring and pinion differential to improve the speed of the truck. The later differential came with high speed and low speed options. Later models were fitted with braces on the outer casing of the rear-end to provide additional support to the rear-end housing.

The suspension of the AA Truck was similar to the Model A Ford in the front end. A leaf spring is centered in the front ‘A’ frame over the front axle. Shock absorbers were available for the front end. The rear suspension differed from the Model A Ford. The AA had leaf springs mounted to the chassis and shackled to the rear axle. The rear suspension did not have shocks.

The controls in the Model AA are entirely mechanical, except the windshield wipers in later models. The brakes are mechanical and the truck has four oversized drum brakes to stop the vehicle. The mechanical system is a pull lever system that applies the force from the pedal to a pivot that pulls the brake rods that expand the brakes in the drums. The brake light is activated when the brake pedal is pushed. The brakes are proportioned more toward the rear drums. The parking brake is a chrome lever on the floor with a release button on the top. The windshield wipers started as hand operated and later models were powered by vacuum diverted from the intake manifold. The horn button is mounted in the middle of the steering wheel assembly. Controls for the lights are also incorporated into the steering assembly. The switch was a three-stop switch for parking lights, headlights and high-beams. The tail-light lens colors on the AA underwent several changes during the production run. Two levers are mounted on the steering column to adjust the engine. The left lever controls the manual advance and retard of the timing. Adjusting the timing of the engine changes the time that a spark will occur in the combustion chamber and those changes affect the performance of the engine. The right lever is a manual control for the throttle. The throttle can be adjusted to ease the shifting of the transmission and the idling speed of the engine. Underneath the dash on the right side is the choke rod. The choke can adjust the flow of fuel from the carburetor into the engine. Turning the knob on the choke rod clockwise closes the fuel flow, leaning out the engine; turning the knob counterclockwise opens the fuel flow to the engine.

The gauge cluster includes three basic gauges. The cluster is in a diamond formation, with the start key and pop-out locking switch is on the left point. The top of the cluster holds the gas gauge, which directly connects into the gas tank, behind the dashboard. The right point holds the amp gauge, which shows the charge rate of the generator. The bottom of the dash holds the speedometer and odometer. Additional gauges can be mounted below the cluster if desired.

During the production of the Model AA, the wheels were also changed. Spoked wheels similar in appearance to Model A wheels but much heavier were used during 1928. Twenty inch 6 slot disc wheels were produced by Budd for Ford during 1929. In 1930, a new style 20 inch 5 slot disc wheel was adopted. These wheels were used for 1930 and part of 1931. The final wheels were a further modification of the 1930 wheel, with a raised center to reinforce the wheels and allow spacing of dual wheels in the rear so the tires would not rub against each other. The dual wheels were used for a variety of body styles, including dump trucks, tow trucks, tankers, fire trucks, and flatbed stake trucks. Wheel nuts changed with each new style of wheel to meet the changes made in the designs of the wheel. Special wheels were produced for ambulances, buses, and funeral coaches (hearses).

== Variants ==
The Model AA was available with a number of options. Two wheelbases were available, 131.5 inches (3,340 mm) and 157 inches (4,000 mm). Various body styles were available on different chassis.

The Model AA Ford was available in a variety of body styles from the Ford Corporation. Specialty bodies include: Funeral Coach, Ambulance, Express Pickup, Dump Truck, and a chassis-cab (no bed). The cab-only model was sold to customers who wanted a custom body to be built by an after-market company. Corporations could have custom paint and other modifications made by Ford for fleets of vehicles.

To eliminate the complexity and cost of its variety of postal trucks, and accommodate the needs of parcel post service. the U.S. Postal Service purchased a fleet of Model A vehicles from Ford that had custom-built postal truck bodies manufactured and assembled by outside builders, notably the Mifflinburg Body Company. These half-ton trucks remained in use, in some cases, until the 1950s.

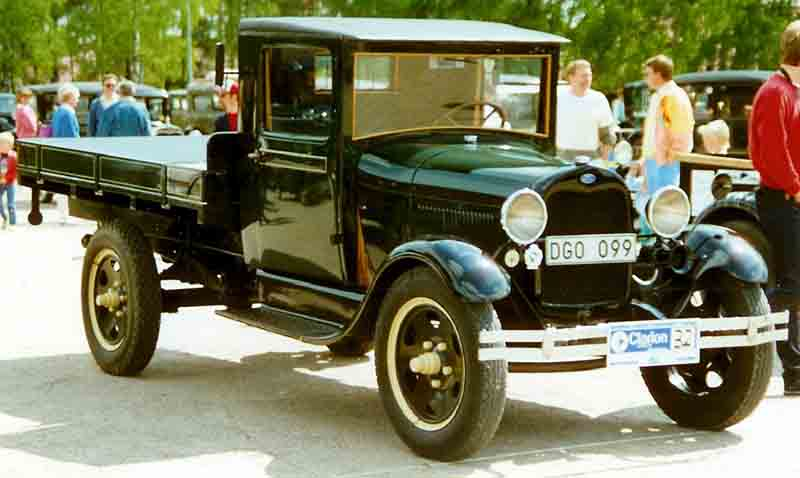
1929 Ford Model AA Truck

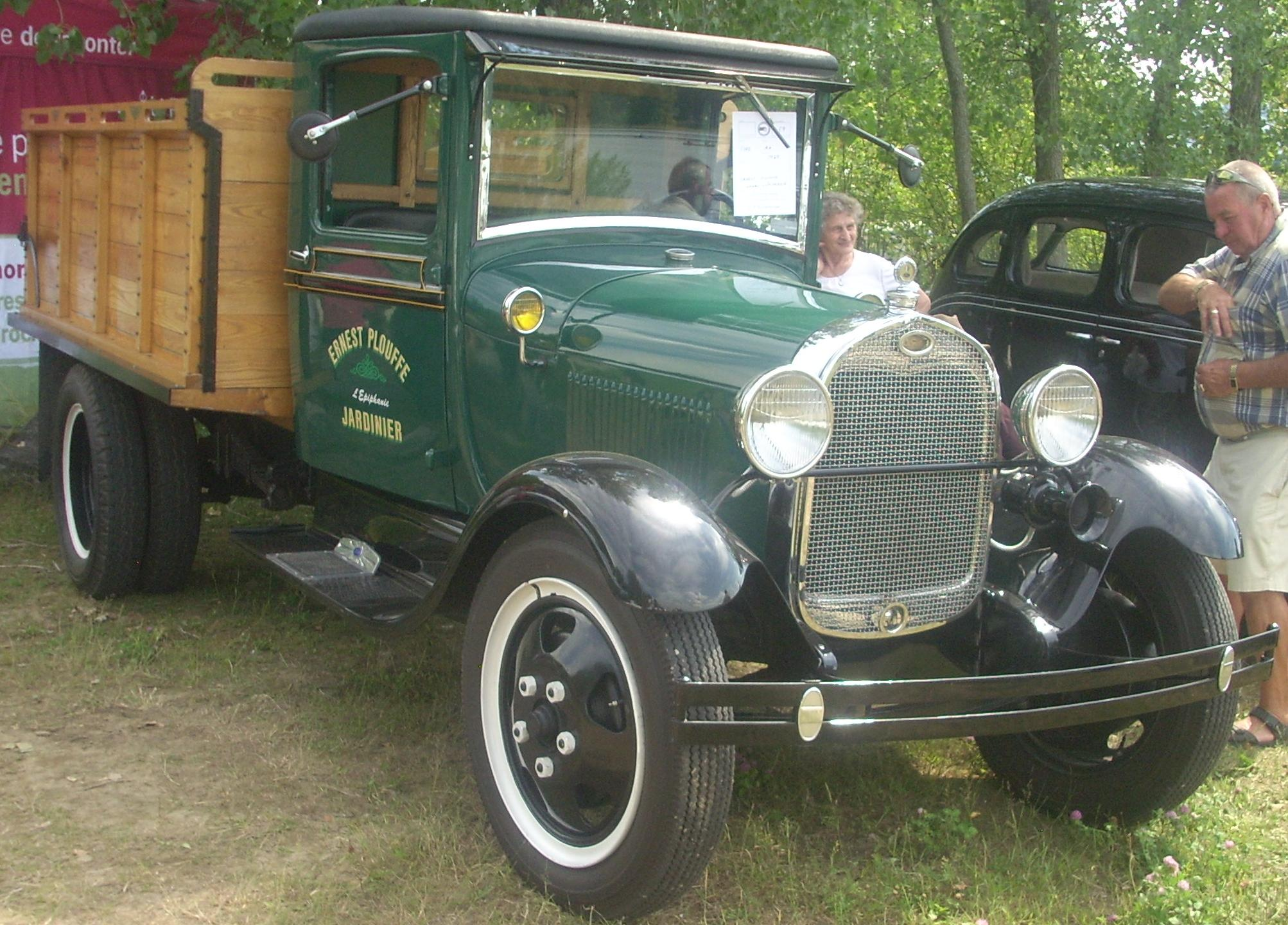
1930 Model AA

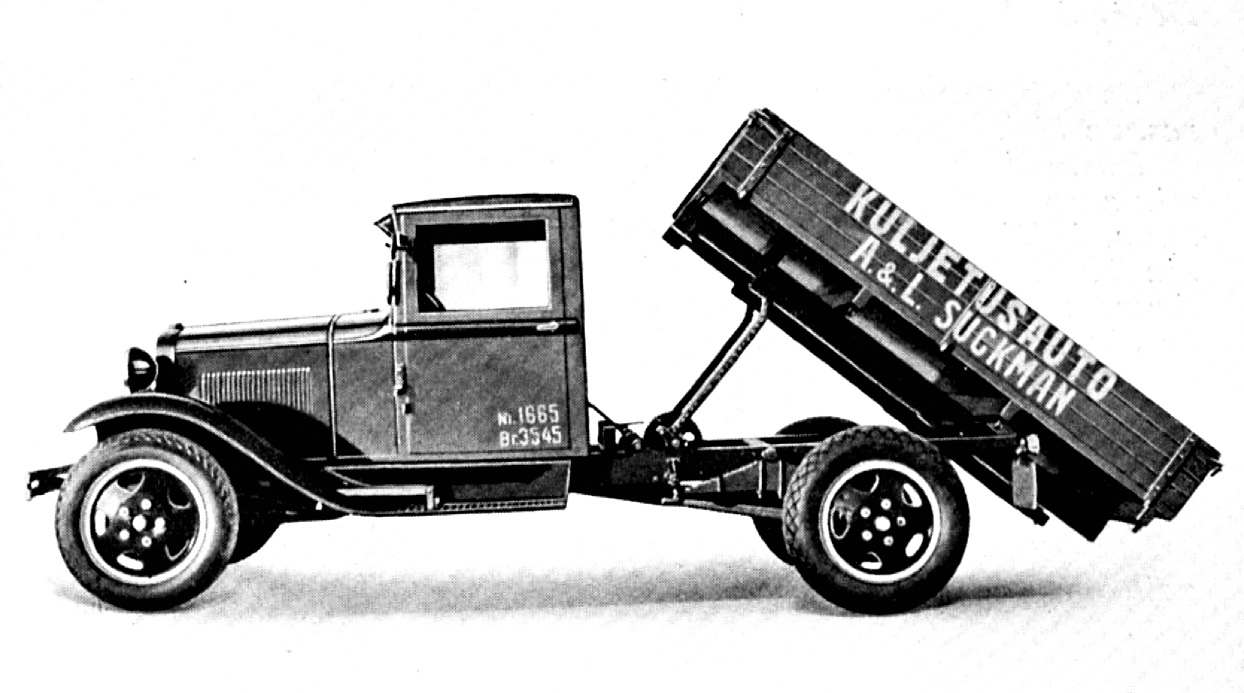
1929 Ford Model AA Dump Truck

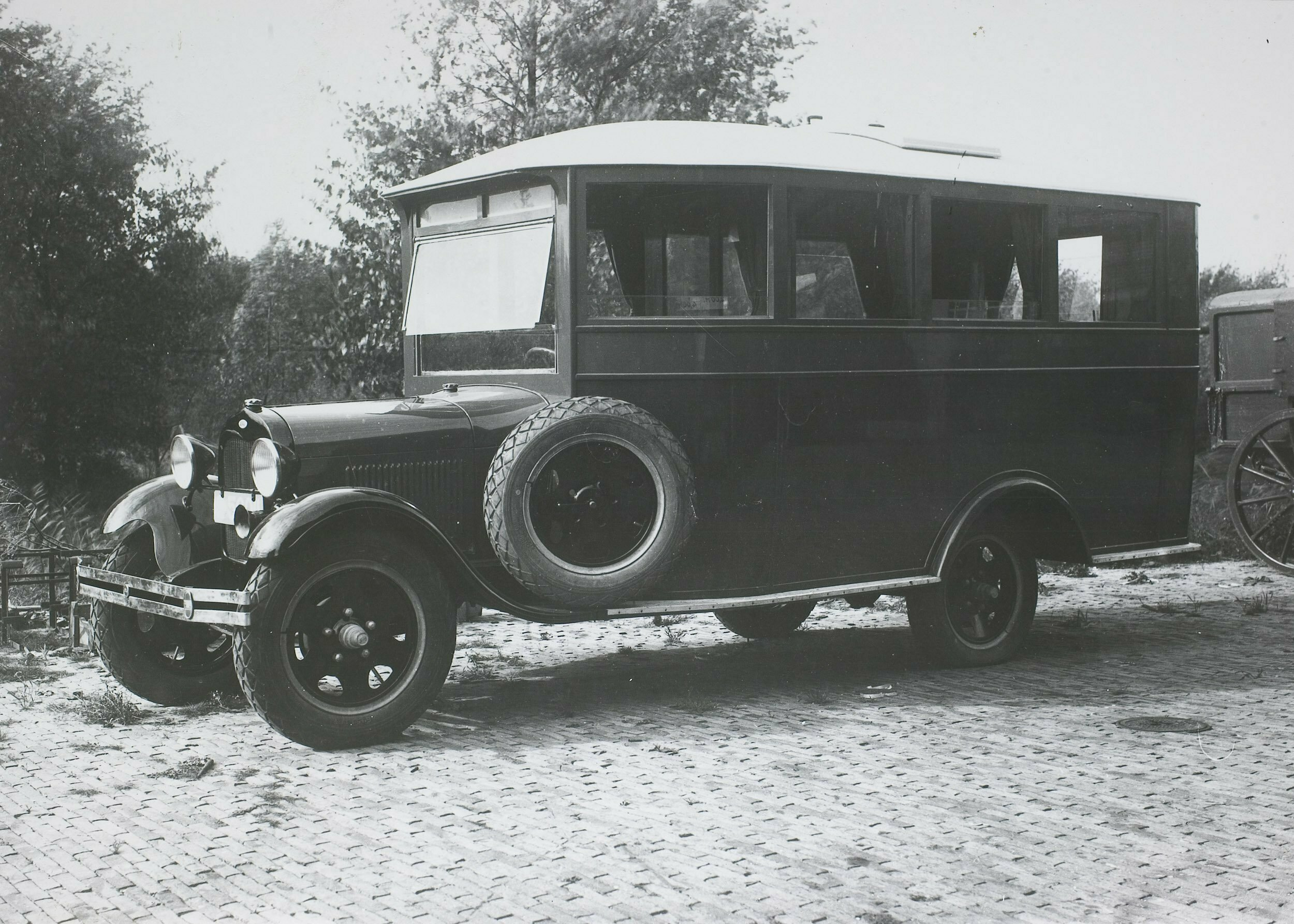
An AA-based bus, 1932

== Overseas production ==
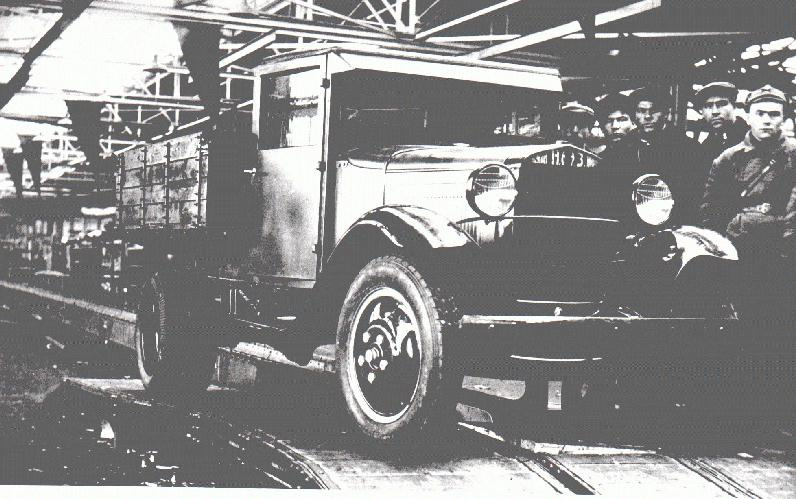
Final assembly of the first truck of the Nizhny Novgorod (Gorky) Automobile Plant - NAZ-AA, 1932

Ford licensed the manufacture of the Model A and AA to a variety of nations, notably the Soviet Union. More than 985,000 AAs were built by GAZ in the USSR from 1932 to 1950. The GAZ version had a cargo capacity of 1,500 kg (3,300 lb). A model with stronger 50 hp (37 kW) engine and wartime simplifications is often named GAZ-MM, after the engine.

In October 1931 a Model AA was the first vehicle produced at Ford of Britain's own new Dagenham plant in England.

The Model AA was also built in several nations in mainland Europe under license from the Ford Corporation. At least three Danish armored vehicles (FP-1, FP-2, and FP-3) were based on the chassis.

== Present day ==
Today, enthusiasm for the Model AA continues. Preservation and restoration of these vehicles remains popular. In the United States, there are two national clubs. One club supports the Model A/Model AA hobby and one club is dedicated specifically to the Model AA. The Model A Restorers Club and the Model A Ford Club of America, along with the Ford Model AA Truck Club work to support members with technical advice and support along with displaying members vehicles as they are being restored.

In some countries, like Uruguay and Cuba, Model AA trucks are still in use, more than 80 years after their introduction.

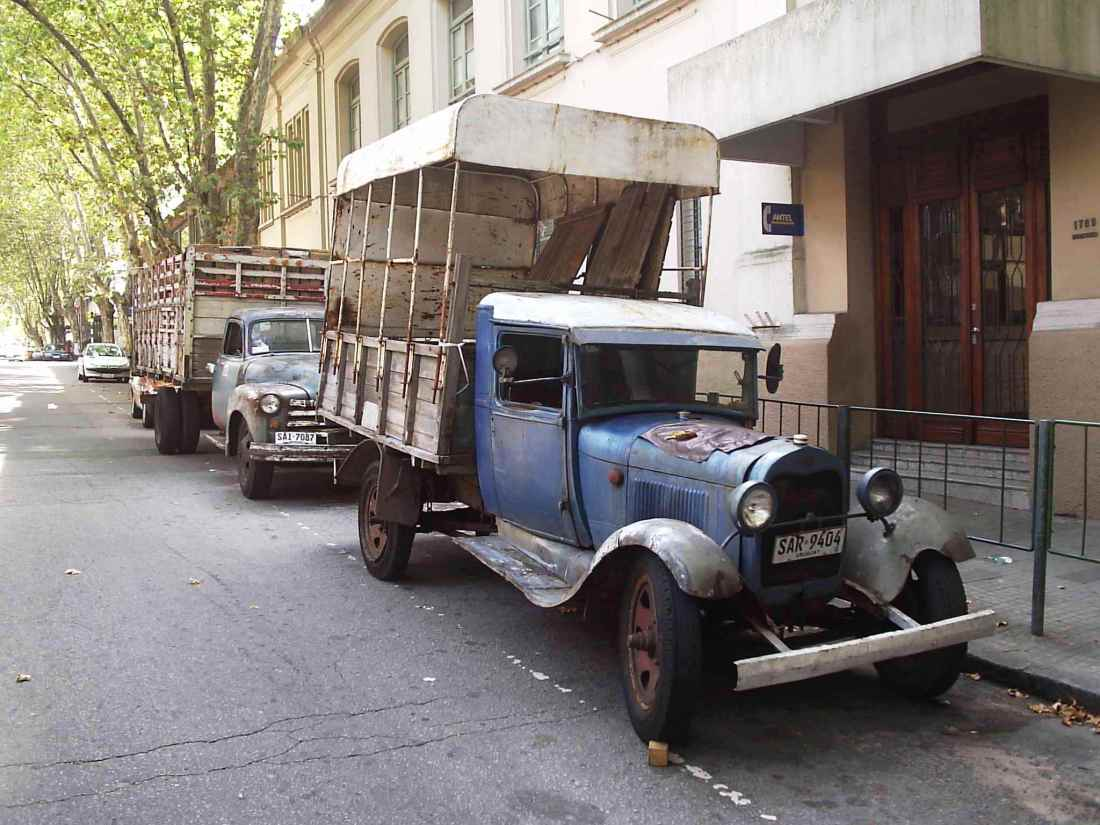
A 1929 AA still working in Montevideo, Uruguay, in 2005

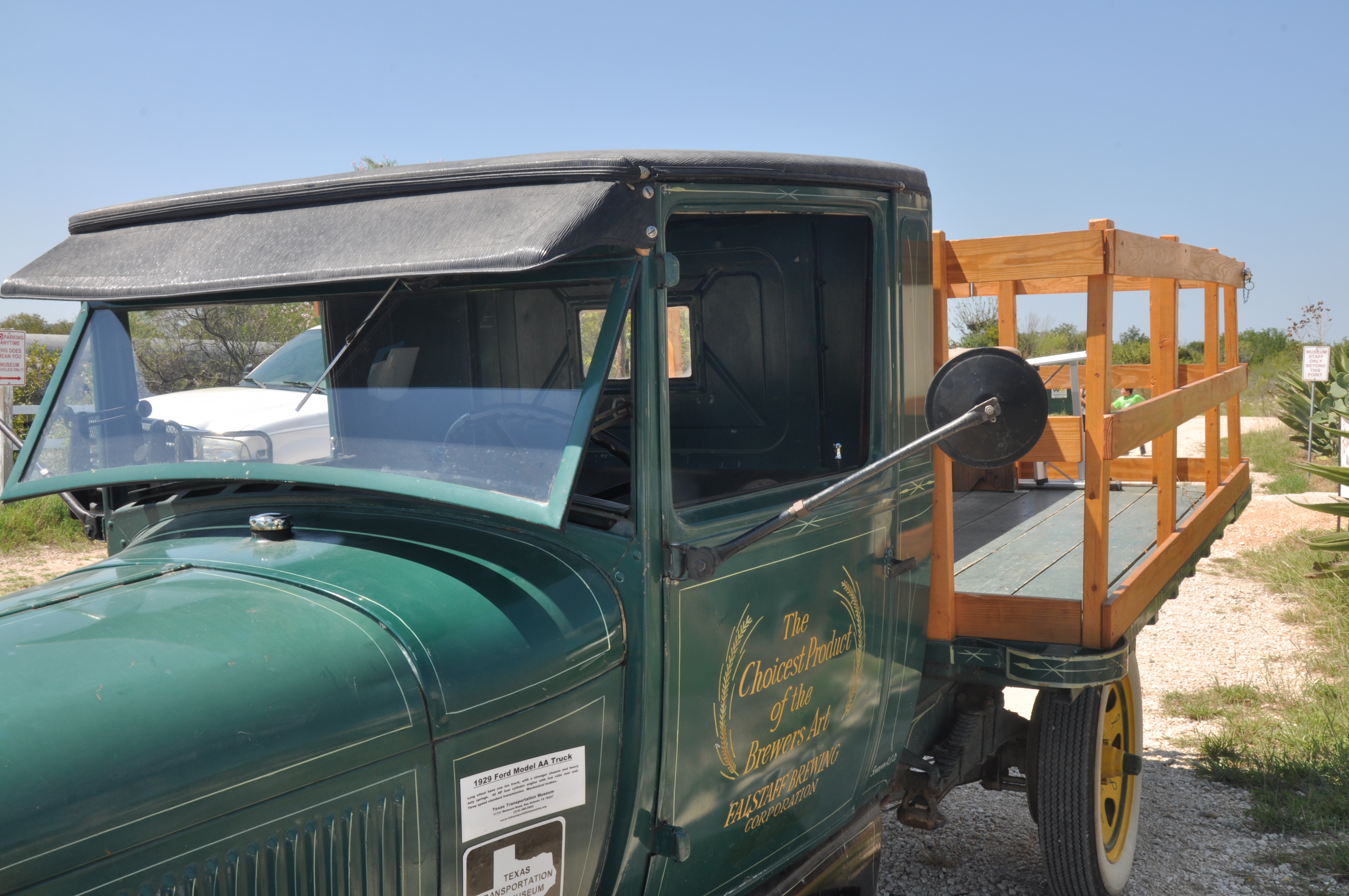
1929 Ford Model AA at the Texas Transportation Museum
