= GAZ-A =

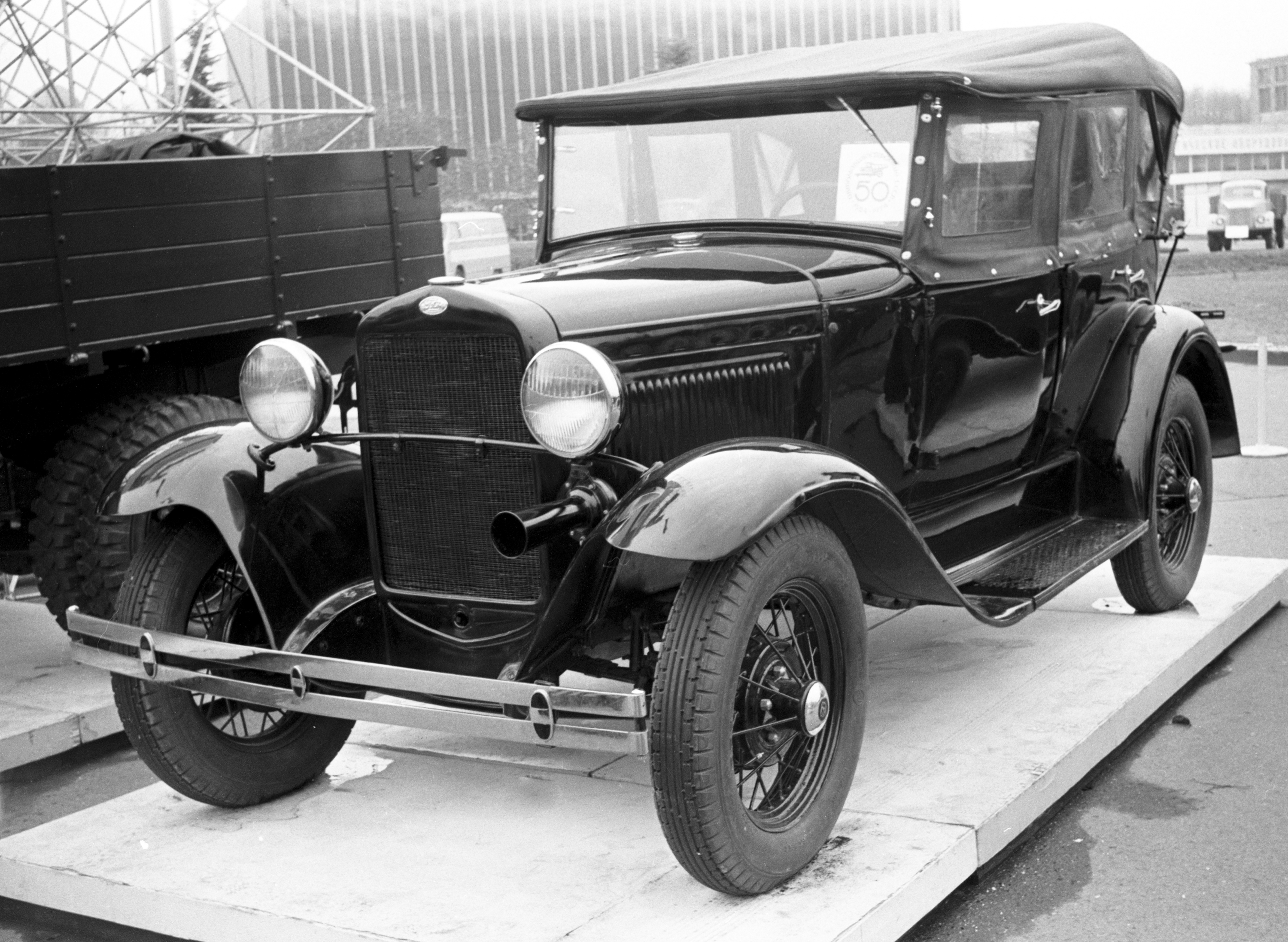

Overview
- Manufacturer: GAZ
- Production: 1932–1936
- Assembly: Soviet Union: Gorky

Body and chassis
- Class: Passenger car
- Layout: FR layout
- Related: Ford Model A GAZ-AA

Powertrain
- Engine: 3.3 L GAZ-A I4
- Transmission: 3-speed manual

Dimensions
- Wheelbase: 2,630 mm (103.5 in)
- Length: 3,875 mm (152.6 in)
- Width: 1,710 mm (67.3 in)
- Height: 1,780 mm (70.1 in)
- Curb weight: 1,080 kg (2,381 lb)

Chronology
- Successor: GAZ-M1

The GAZ-A is a passenger car that was mass-produced by GAZ from 1932 until 1936. It was the first passenger car to be produced in the Soviet Union and is a near-exact copy of the Ford Model A from 1930. To the local population, the car was nicknamed "Gazik".

== History ==
The cooperation between the Ford Motor Company and Russia dates back to the year 1909. Ford was an important supplier of passenger cars and commercial vehicles such as tractors and trucks, especially in the 1910s and 1920s. Tens of thousands were imported into the Soviet Union because its vehicle industry was underdeveloped.

The first five-year plan, in 1928, which generally contributed greatly to the development of Soviet industry, envisaged building-up a domestic automobile industry. In 1929, an official contract was signed with Ford, which provided that, every year, the USSR would buy large numbers of kits for Ford models, to be assembled in the newly built Nizhny Novgorod Automobile Plant, shortened to NAZ (GAZ from 1933). Vehicles were also assembled at the KIM plant in Moscow.

As early as the beginning of 1931, the Soviet government stated that the projected quantities were far too large. The Great Depression hit Ford, but not the Soviet Union, significantly fewer kits were needed.

By the end of 1932, the factory in Gorky (now Nizhny Novgorod) had been brought up to a level where it was able to produce automobiles, and the first cars left the factory on 8 December. At about the same time, the production of the GAZ-AA began, which was a truck built on the same chassis as the car and included many other parts from it. The drawings for the GAZ-AA came from Ford.

By 1935, 100,000 vehicles, mostly trucks, had been built in the new plant. In the same year, the contract between Ford and the Soviet Union was dissolved by mutual agreement. In 1936, production ended after 41,917 cars had been produced, in favor of the successor, the GAZ-M1.

== Variants ==
- GAZ-A: Main production version. Produced from 1932–1936.
- GAZ-A-Aremkuz: Third-party conversion of GAZ-A to a closed four-door by the Aremkuz plant in Moscow.
- GAZ-AA: Pickup truck version. Produced from 1932–1938.
- GAZ-4: Pickup truck based on the GAZ-A. Produced from 1933–1936.
- GAZ-AAA: Heavy Duty Truck based on GAZ-A. Often in Anti-Aircraft role with quadruple Maxim guns. Produced from 1936-1943.
- GAZ-6 "Pioneer": Two-door sedan, based on the GAZ-A. Produced from 1933–1936.
- GAZ-AAAA: Prototype three-axle car based on the GAZ-A. The cab was from the GAZ-AA while the rear drive was from the GAZ-AAA. The two side-mounted spare tires could rotate to make it easier to overcome obstacles.
- GAZ-TK: Three-axle car based on the GAZ-A. Produced from 1936–1938
- GAZ-MM: Modernized and Improved version of GAZ-AA. Produced by GAZ from 1938-1947 and by UAZ from 1947-1956.
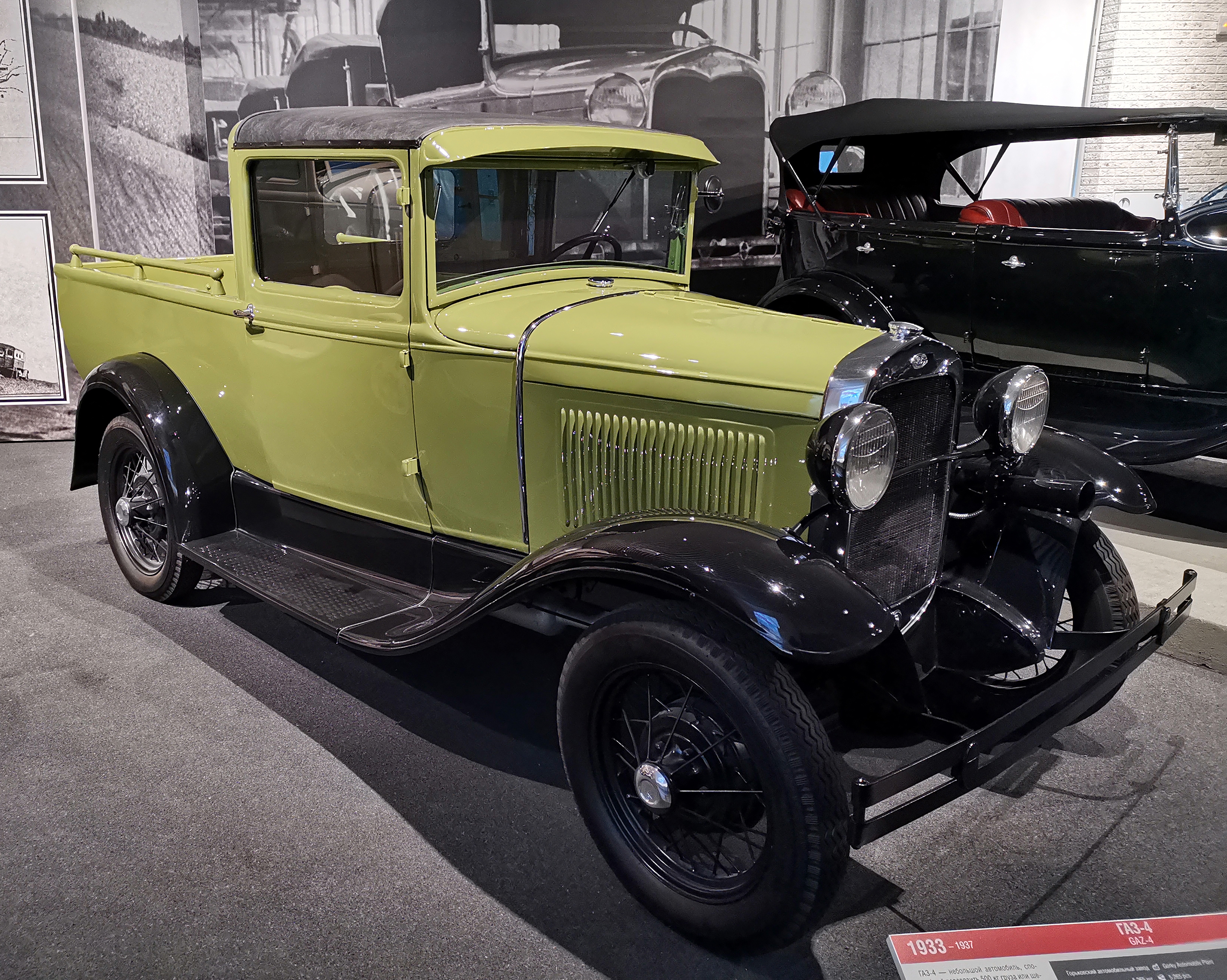
GAZ-4

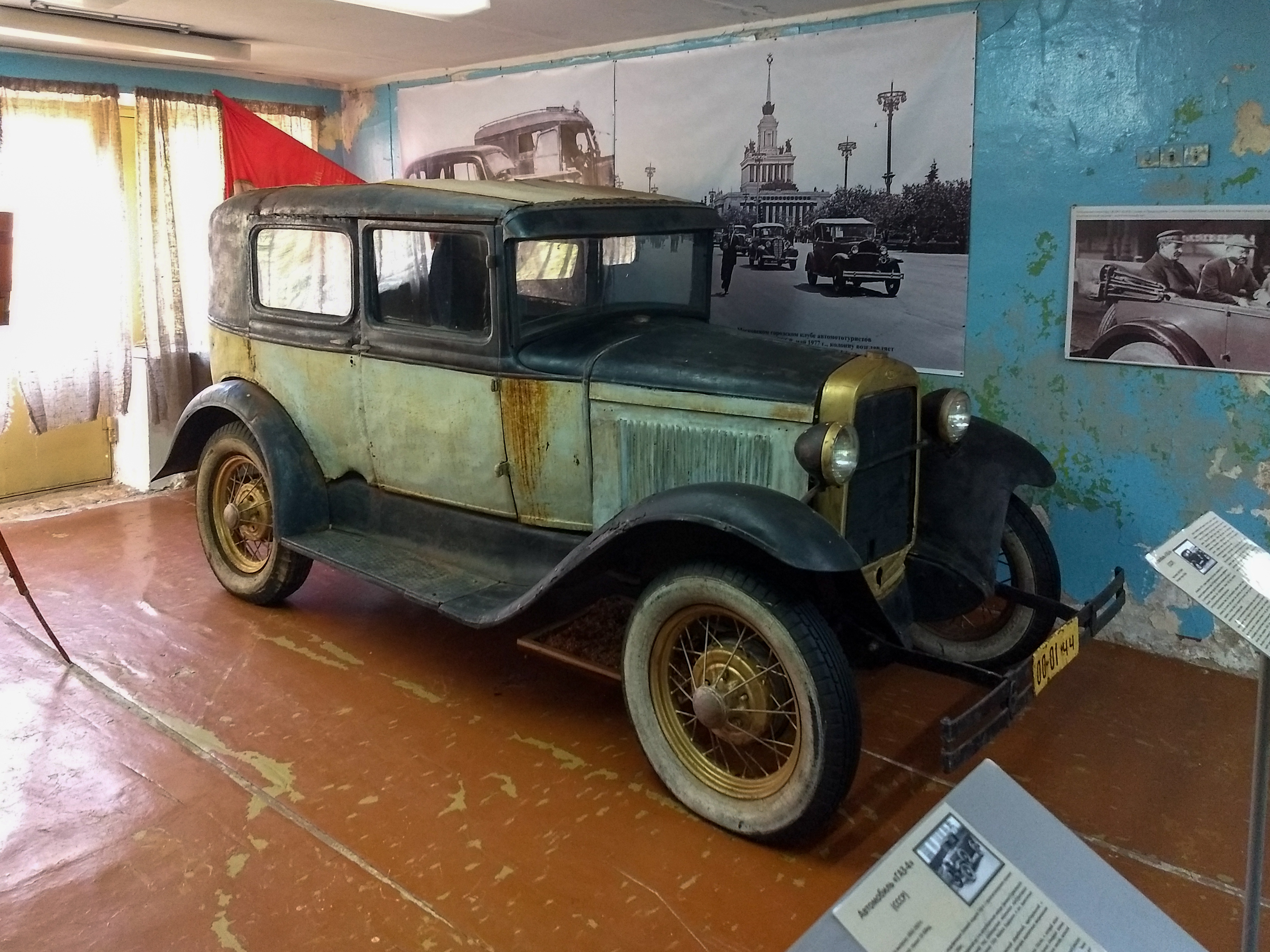
GAZ-6
