= GAZ-55 =

Soviet-era military ambulance

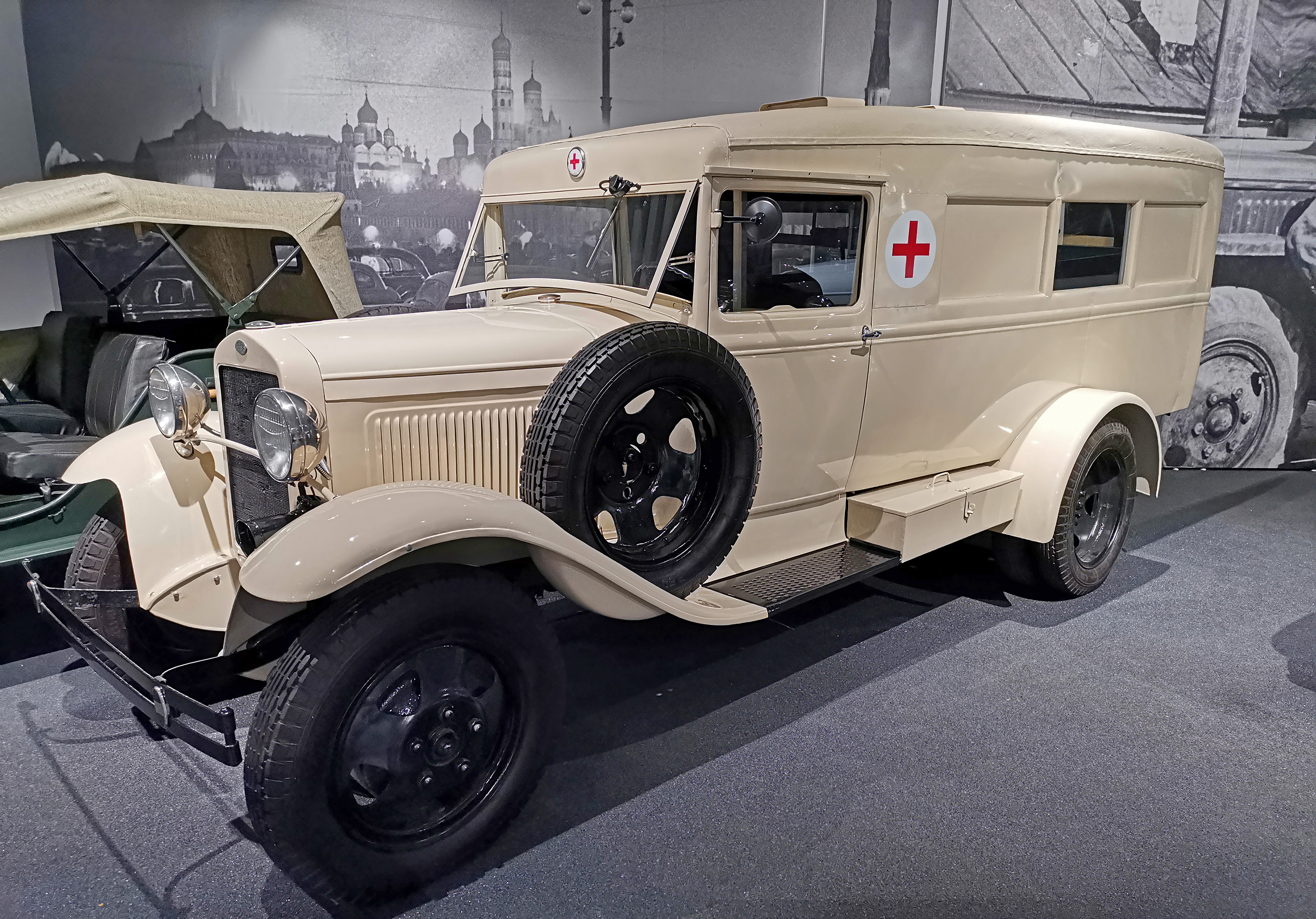
- GAZ-55 in a museum in Yekaterinburg (2021)
- Type: Military ambulance
- Place of origin: USSR

Service history
- In service: Second World War

Production history
- Manufacturer: Gorkovsky Avtomobilny Zavod
- Produced: 1938–1946
- No. built: 9130
- Variants: GAZ-AA

Specifications
- Mass: 2,370 kg (5,220 lb)
- Length: 5.425 m (17 ft 9.6 in)
- Width: 2.040 m (6 ft 8.3 in)
- Height: 2.340 m (7 ft 8.1 in)
- Crew: 2
- Armour: None
- Engine: 4-cyl, 3285 cc 50 hp (37 kW) at 2800 rpm
- Payload capacity: 4 stretchers and two sitting
- Operational range: 195 km (121 mi)
- Maximum speed: 70 km/h (43 mph)

The GAZ-55 (Russian: ГАЗ-55) was a Soviet military ambulance developed in the 1930s by Gorkovsky Avtomobilny Zavod (GAZ) and was used by the USSR during the Second World War. It was based on the GAZ-AA model. With only 9,130 models ever produced, the Red Army still relied heavily on standard trucks to transport their wounded. Production of this ambulance reportedly continued until 1946.

At least one GAZ-55 was captured by a unit of the Luftwaffe.

== In popular culture ==
The GAZ-55 is featured in the 1941 Russian film 'Frontovye podrugi' (The Girl from Leningrad).

== In video games ==
The GAZ-55 is featured in the video game 'Red Orchestra 2: Heroes of Stalingrad'.

== Gallery ==
The GAZ-55 in the Russian film 'Frontovye podrugi'.
