= Ford Model TT =

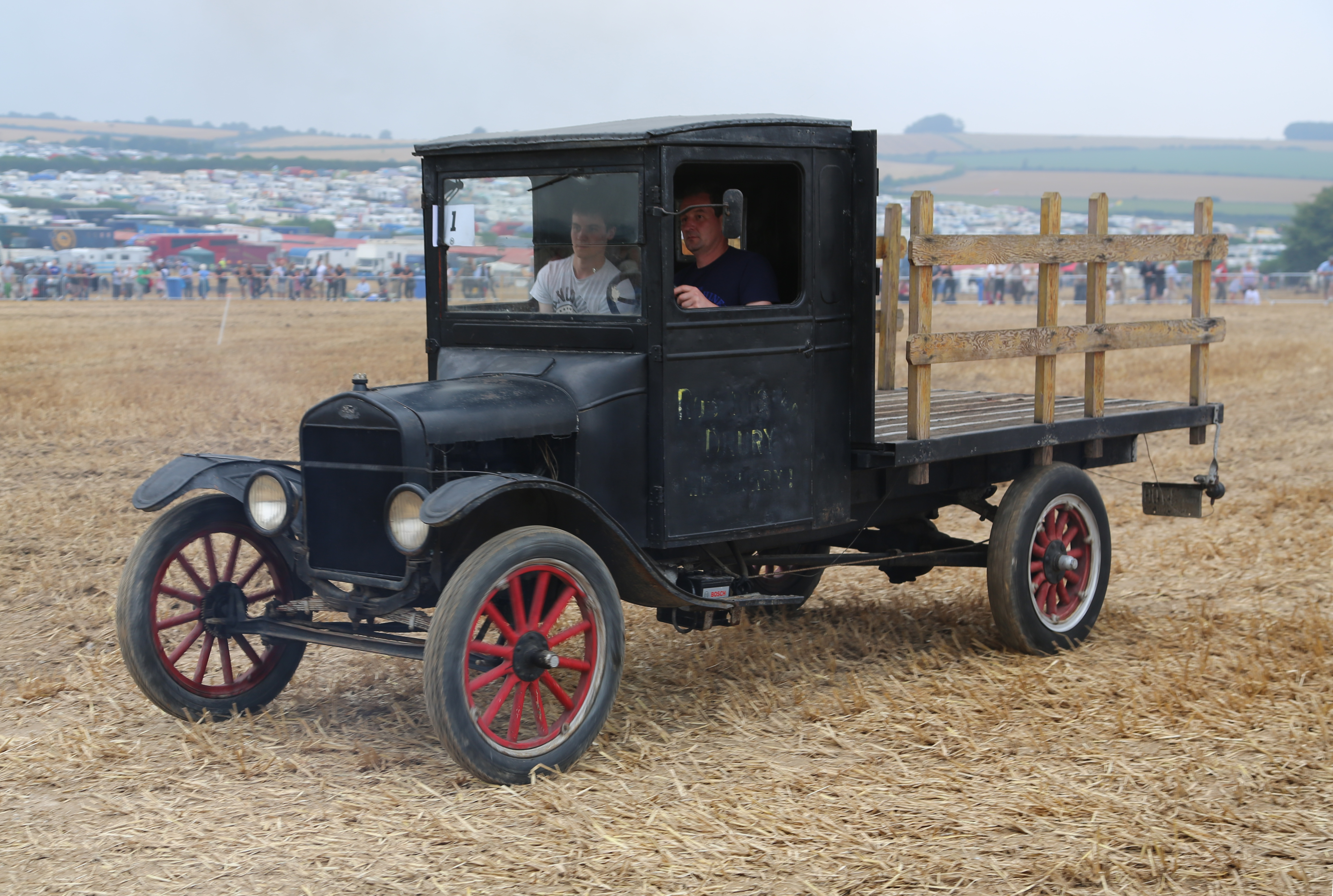

Overview
- Manufacturer: Ford
- Production: 1917–1928
- Designer: Henry Ford and Edsel Ford

Body and chassis
- Class: Heavy commercial
- Body style: 2-door pickup truck 2-door panel truck 2-door canopy express 2-door box truck 2-door stake truck
- Platform: TT chassis
- Related: Ford Model T

Powertrain
- Engine: 177 cu in (2.9 L) 20 hp I4
- Transmission: 2-speed manual and reverse

Dimensions
- Wheelbase: 131 in (3,327 mm); 157.5 in (4,000 mm)
- Length: Varied by body style
- Width: 67 in (1,702 mm)
- Height: Varied by body style
- Curb weight: Varied by body style

Chronology
- Successor: Ford Model AA

The Ford Model TT is a truck made by Ford. It was based on the Ford Model T, but with a longer wheelbase, and a heavier frame and rear axle, giving it a rating of 1 short ton (0.91 t).

== Production ==
When the first three units were produced in 1917, the Model TT was sold as a chassis with the buyer supplying a body. The price was $600. Starting in 1924, the truck was available with a factory-produced body. By 1926 the price had dropped to $325. In 1925, a hand-operated windshield wiper was added.

=== Military production ===
In his World Encyclopedia of Military Vehicles, author Pat Ware writes that: "During World War I, the Model T was ... standardized in the "light" class. The first truck, using a long-wheelbase chassis designated Model TT, was launched in 1917. Although Ford ... was a pacifist, he was ... happy to supply the US Army with more than 12,000 of these vehicles,..." and: "There was no civilian production of the Model Ts between 1917 and 1918."

Further on, Ware writes: "The Model T was widely used by the US and British armies during World War I as a staff car, ambulance, van and cargo truck, even as an artillery tractor, for which application the truck was fitted with twinned rear tyres." Many remained in service into the 1930s.

Below are the numbers of Model T trucks produced each year, not including Canadian production.

Year	Production
1917	3
1918	41,105
1919	70,816
1920	53,787
1921	64,796
1922	154,039
1923	246,817
1924	259,118
1925	306,434
1926	213,914
1927	74,335

== Drivetrain ==
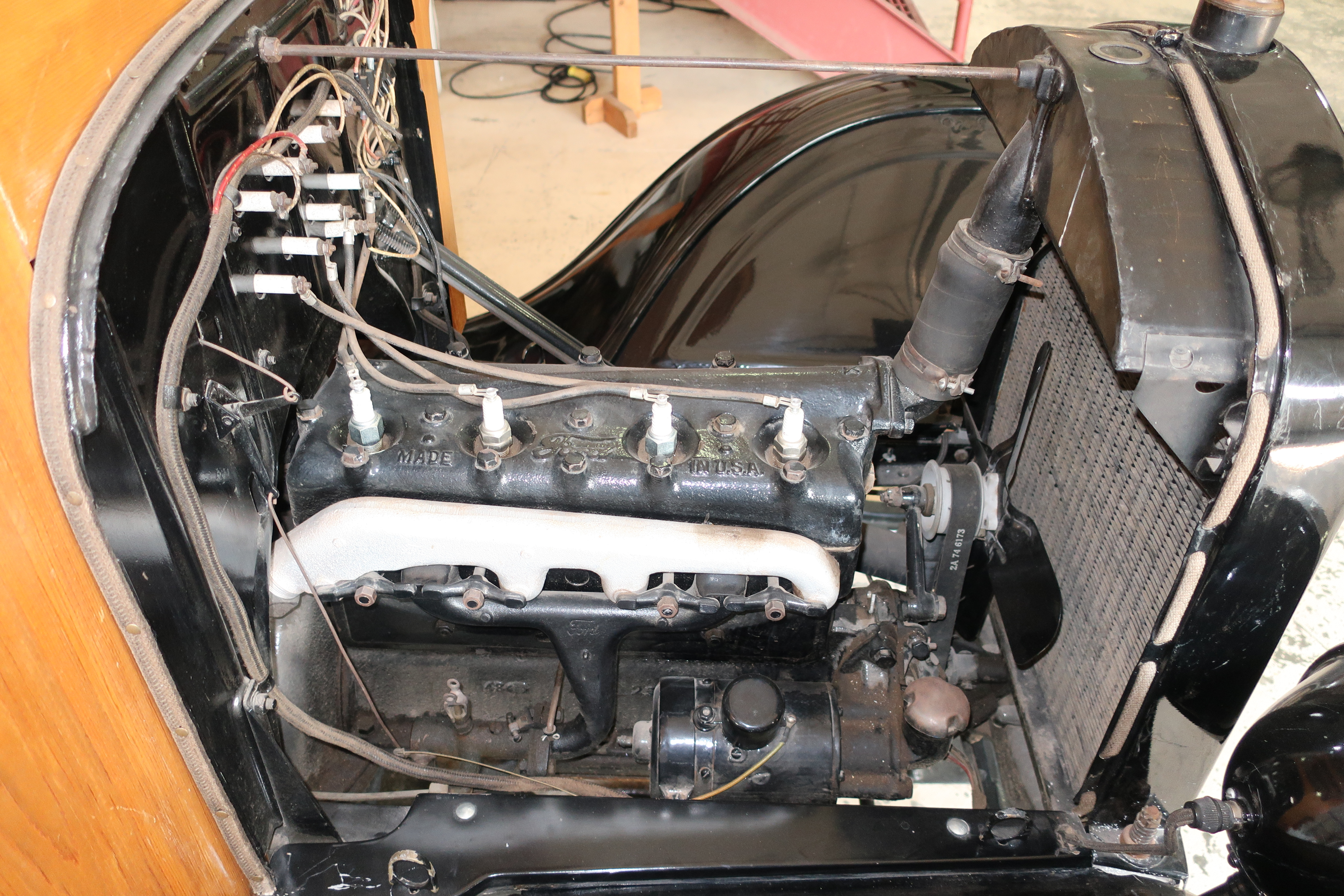
1926 Ford Model TT truck engine at Campbell County Rockpile Museum in Gillette, Wyoming

The rear axle of the TT has a worm drive and crown wheel, unlike the Model T's crown wheel and pinion. The worm is located at the end of the drive shaft and above the crown wheel. The wheelbase of the Model TT is 125 inches (3,175 mm), compared to 100 inches (2,540 mm) for the Model T. It was often equipped with an accessory gearbox, such as the Ruckstell or Jumbo gearboxes, which allow the truck to have intermediate gears between low and high, useful for hill climbing.

The Model TT was very durable for the time, but slow when compared to other trucks. With standard gearing, a speed of not more than 15 mph (24 km/h) was recommended, and with special gearing, a speed of not more than 22 mph (35 km/h) was recommended. Standard worm gear ratio is 7.25:1, and special gearing gives a ratio of 5.17:1. Because of this, accessory catalogs offered items to help give the Model TT more power.

It was replaced by the Ford Model AA truck in 1928.

== Depot hacks ==
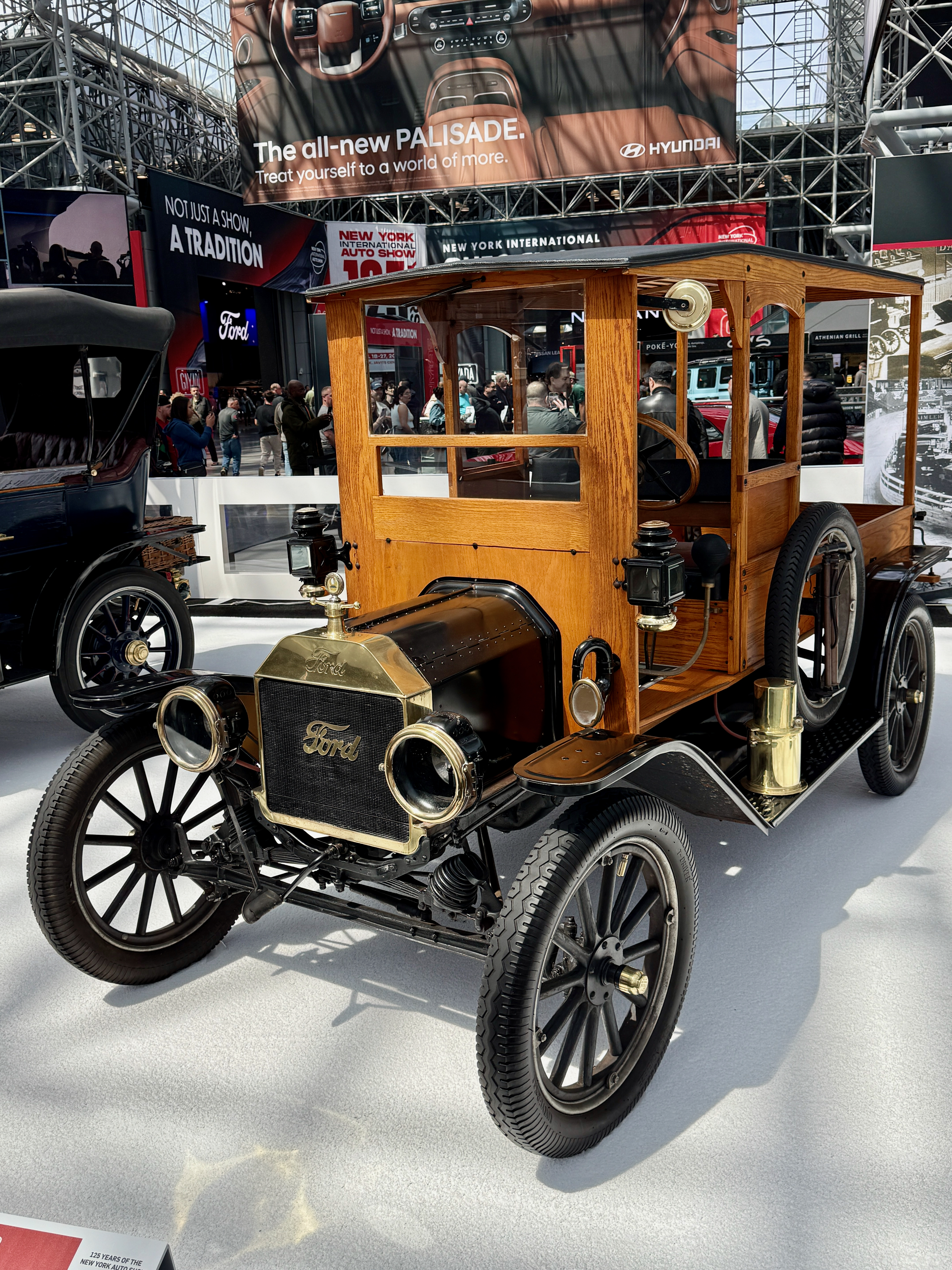
1910 Ford Model T Depot Hack

There were also various depot hacks made on the chassis of the Ford Model TT with bodies built by independent coachbuilders. The Depot Hack was made to hold luggage and passengers and was used as a minibus-like vehicle or taxi. It was specifically built to hold a high capacity of people and their luggage, the depot hack was not on Ford's catalogue but was made by independent firms who then marketed it as a passenger vehicle. It had a 20 hp (15 kW), 176 cu in (2,884 cc), four-cylinder engine, and a 2-speed planetary transmission.

== Gallery ==
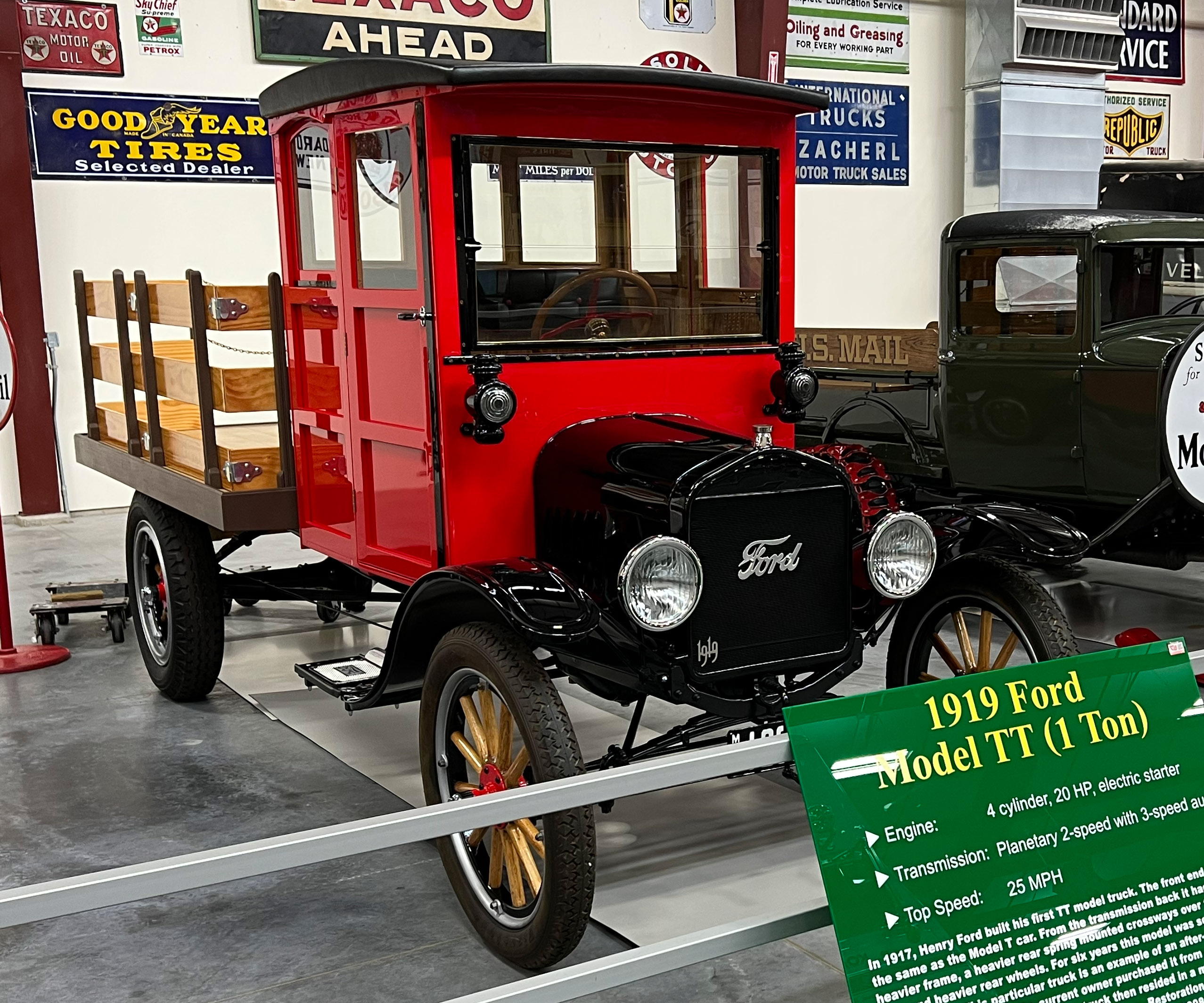
1919 Ford Model TT on display at the Iowa 80 Trucking Museum, Walcott, Iowa.

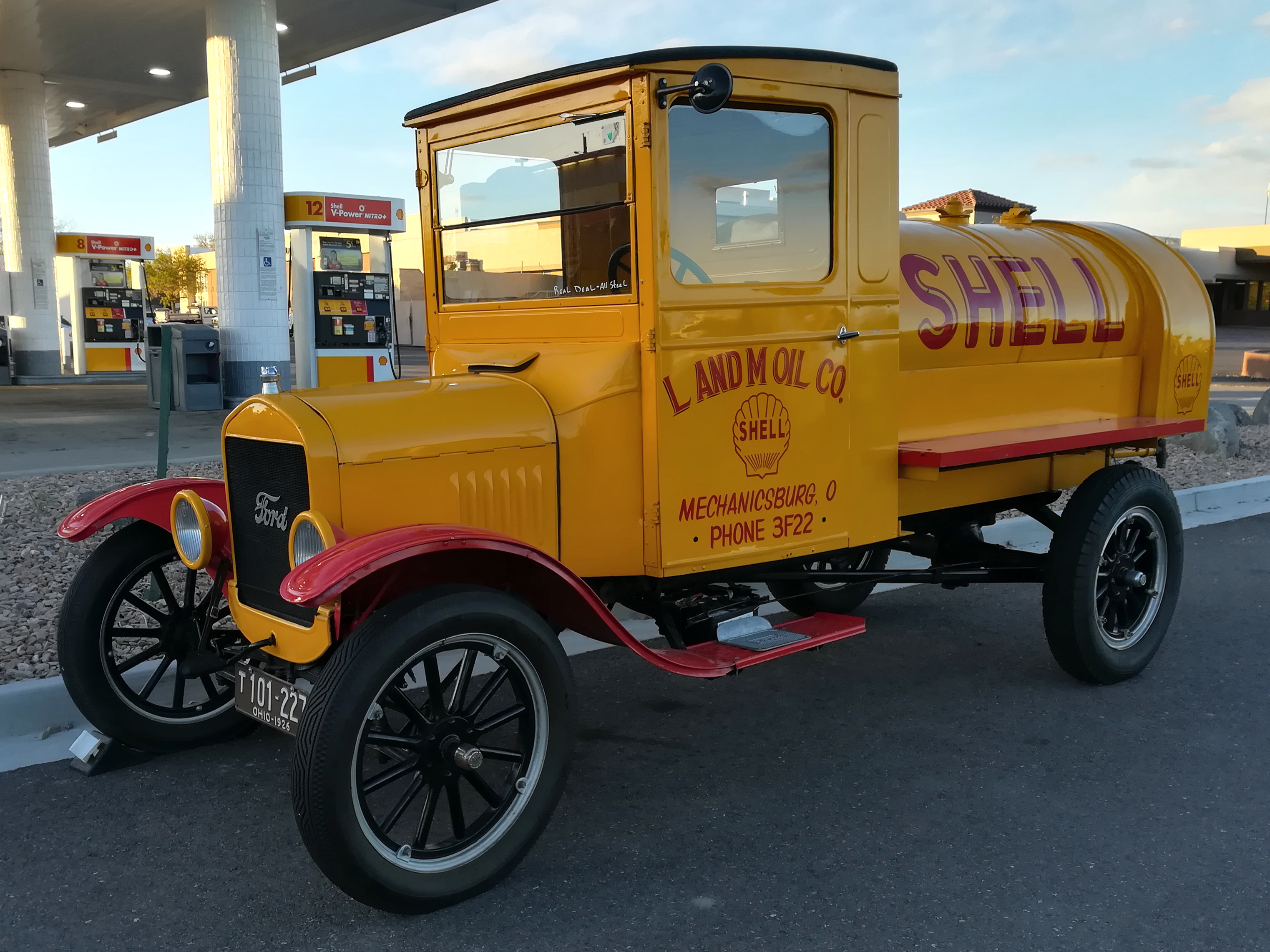
1926 Model TT tank truck

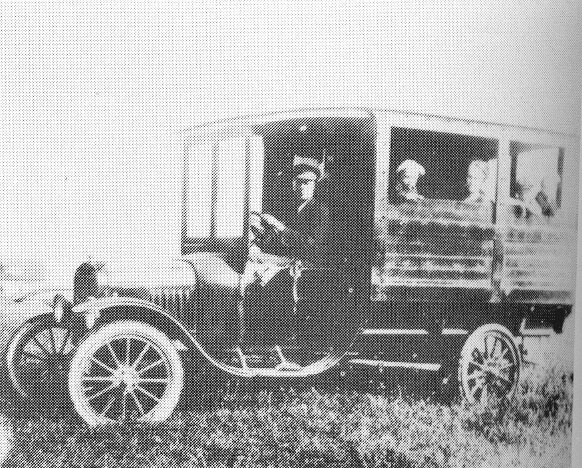
Ford TT used as a bus in Skanör, Sweden in 1920

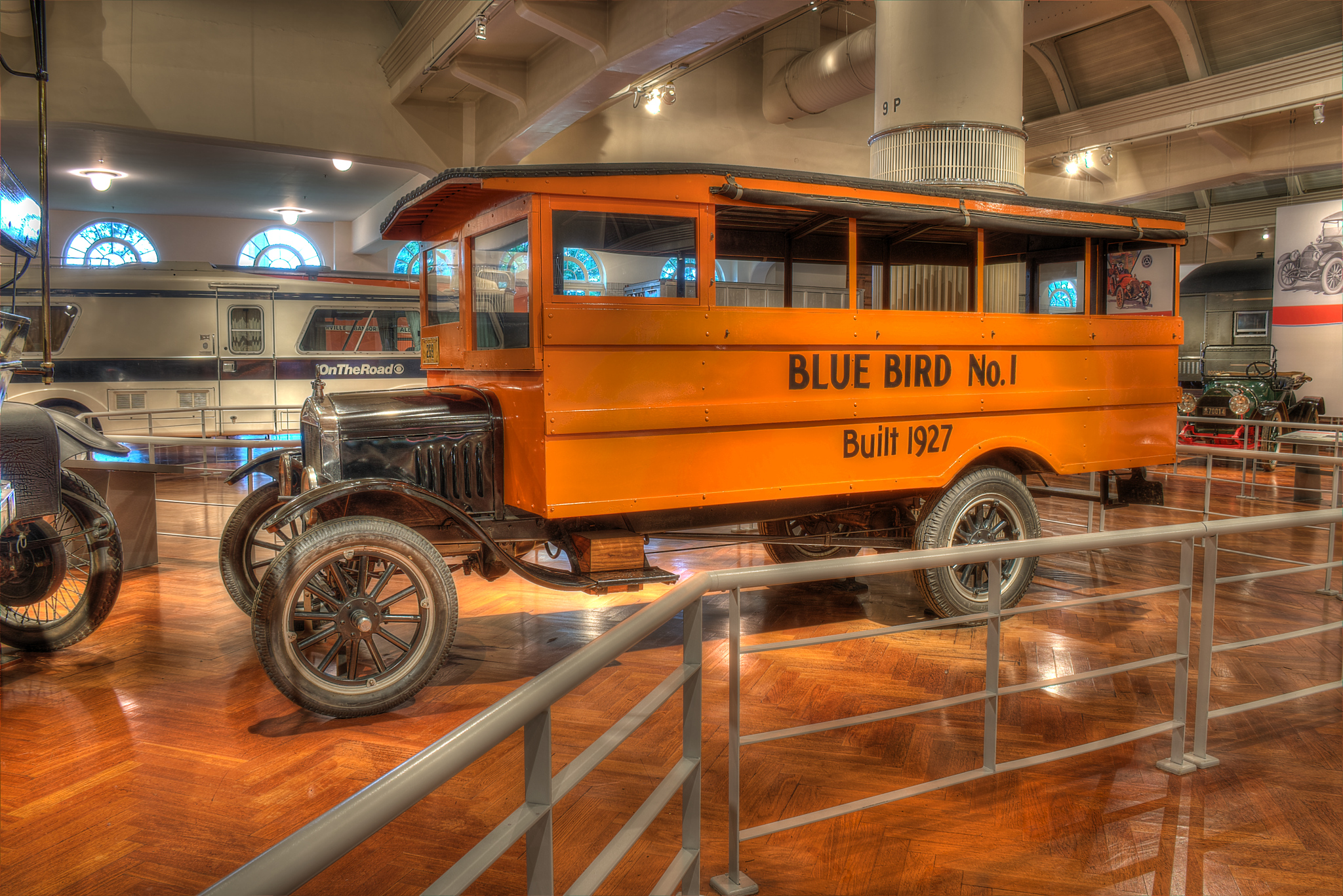
Blue Bird school bus built on a 1927 Ford Model TT

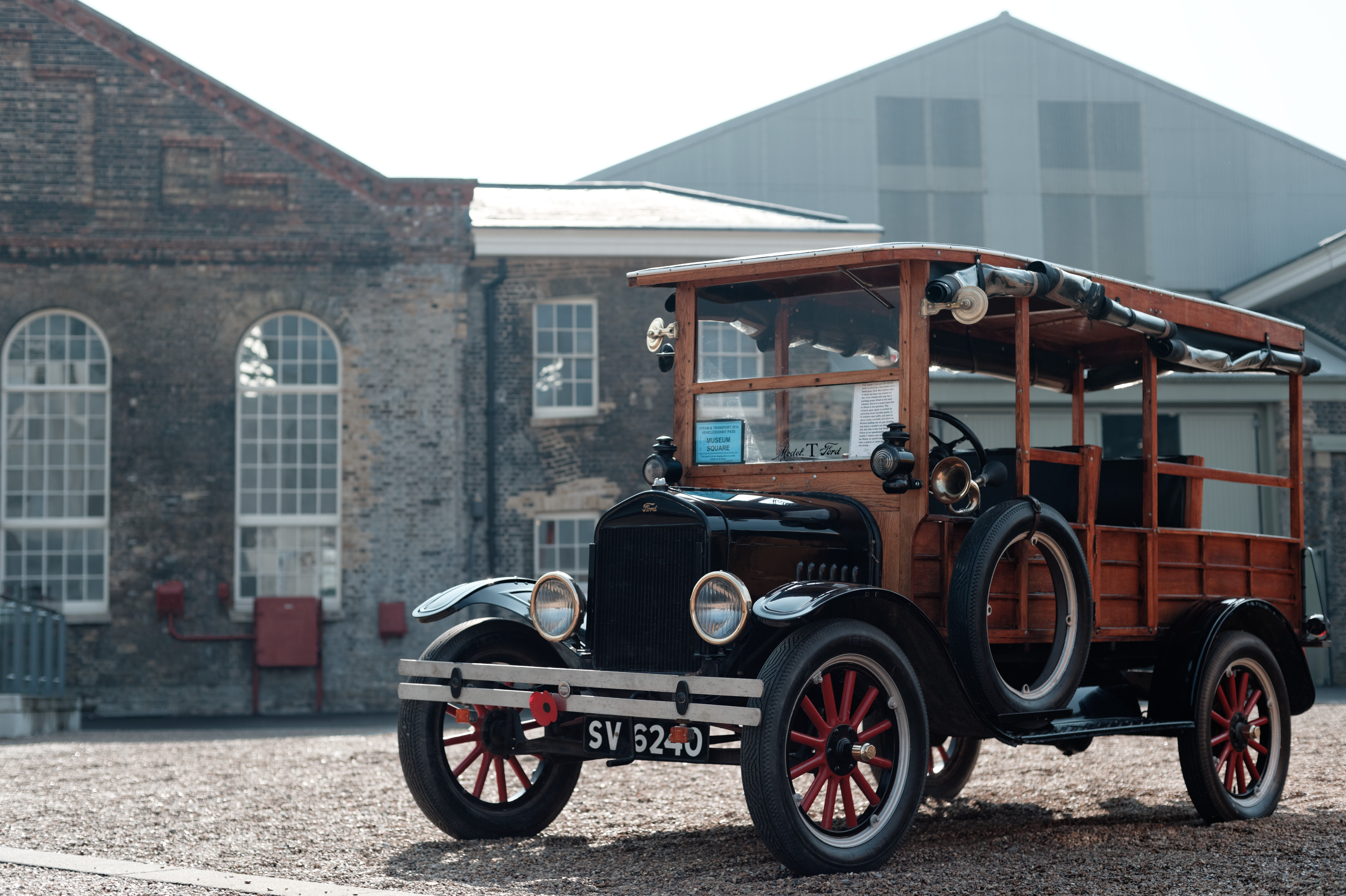
Black 1920s Ford Model T Depot Hack Woody Wagon at Chatham Historic Dockyard, Kent, England

== Bibliography ==
Gunnell, John A. (2003). Standard Catalog of American Light-Duty Trucks. Iola, Wisconsin: Krause Publications. ISBN 0-87341-238-9.
