= GAZ-AA =

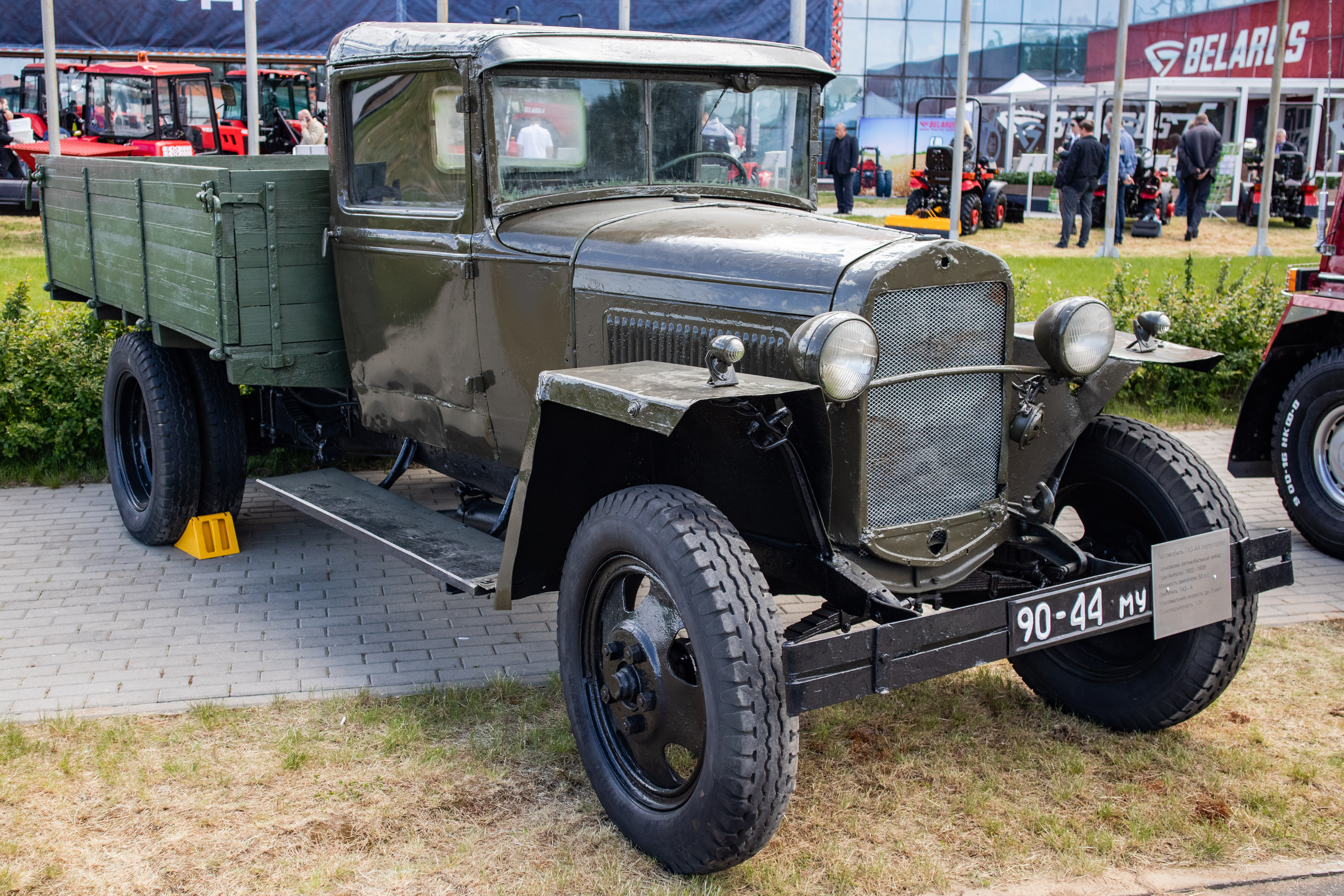

Overview
- Manufacturer: GAZ
- Production: 1932–1938
- Assembly: Soviet Union: Gorky

Body and chassis
- Class: Truck
- Layout: FR layout
- Related: GAZ-A; GAZ-AAA

Powertrain
- Engine: 3.3 L GAZ-AA I4
- Transmission: 4-speed manual

Dimensions
- Wheelbase: 3,440 mm (135.4 in)
- Length: 5,335 mm (210.0 in)
- Width: 2,040 mm (80.3 in)
- Height: 1,970 mm (77.6 in)
- Curb weight: 1,810 kg (3,990 lb)

Chronology
- Predecessor: Ford Model AA
- Successor: GAZ-MM

The GAZ-AA is a truck produced at the Gorky Auto Plant in the Soviet Union from 1932 to 1938, and was the factory's first truck produced under the GAZ brand. Russian-speakers often refer to it as a polutorka (полуторка) - meaning "one-and-a halfer", with reference to its carrying capacity of 1.5 tonnes (1500 kilograms).

== History ==
On 31 May 1929, the Supreme Soviet of the National Economy of the Soviet Union (Russian: Высший совет народного хозяйства СССР) made an agreement with the Ford Motor Company to produce Ford Model A and Model AA vehicles, and the Soviet Metallostroy organisation (Russian: Металлострой) started constructing an American-designed automotive plant in Nizhny-Novgorod.

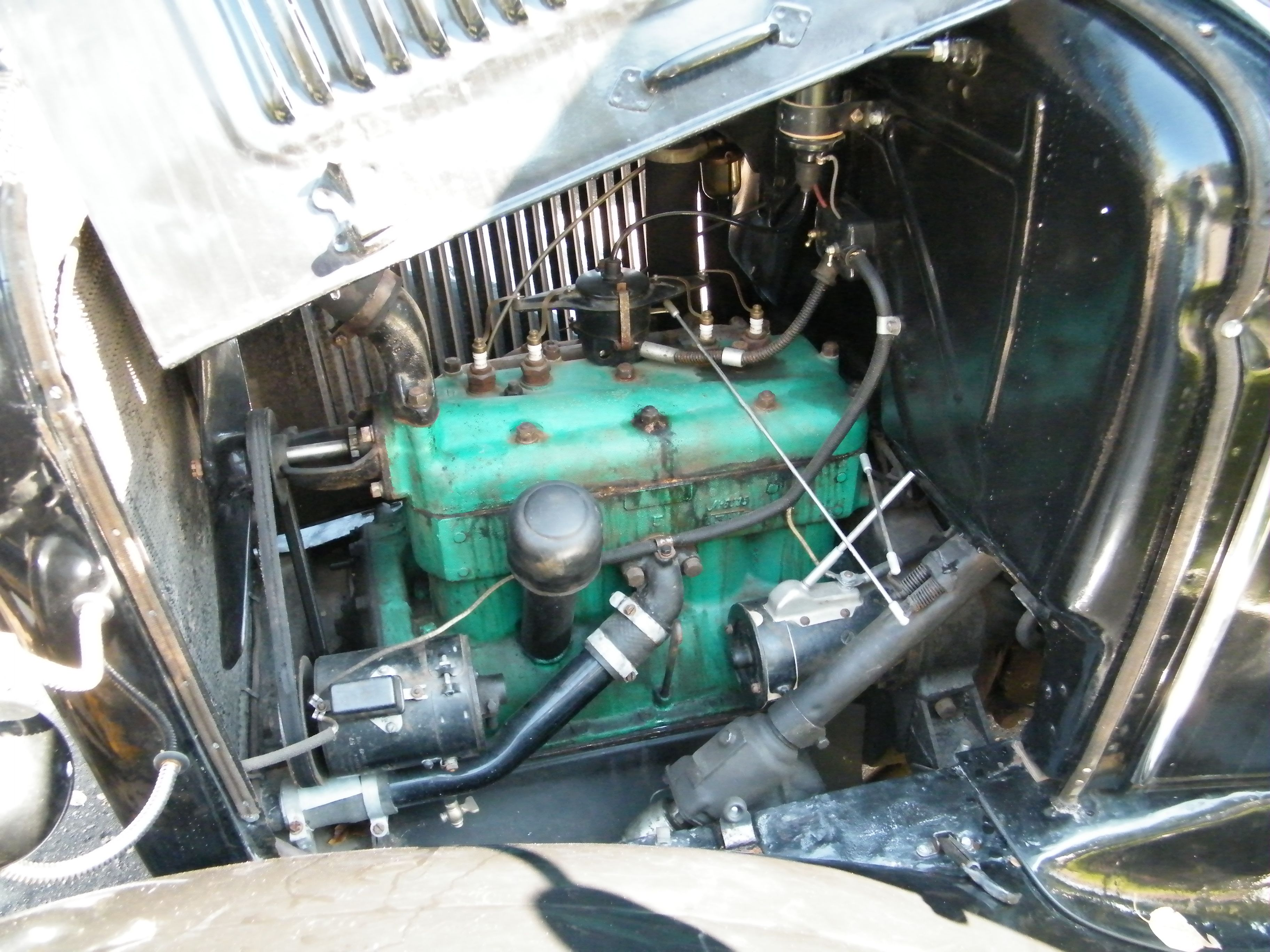
GAZ-AA engine

Initially, 10 Ford Model AA trucks were built at the plant, under the name NAZ (for Nizhny Novgorod Avtomobilny Zavod). Soviet engineers prepared their own mechanical blueprints for production, specifying a truck to be made with thicker steel and to have an upgraded suspension system. In 1932, the city of Nizhny Novgorod adopted its new name, Gorky - after Maxim Gorky (1868-1936) - and in 1933, the plant was renamed to Gorky Avtomobilny Zavod, and the trucks began to use the model designation GAZ-AA. By 1932, mass-production had started, with around 60 trucks built at the plant daily from knock-down kits sent by Ford.

Soon, assembly started of GAZ-A passenger vehicles, which were based on the Ford Model A and were also built from knock-down kits imported into the Soviet Union. By that time, GAZ-AA trucks comprised the majority of trucks used by the Red Army. Several modifications of the GAZ-AA trucks started getting produced, including dump trucks (410), semi-trucks (MS), fire trucks (PMG-1) and tractors (905).

By 1938, nearly 1 million of these trucks had been produced and sold. By that time a modernized variant of the GAZ-AA trucks, under the GAZ-MM index entered production, with the engine from the GAZ-M1, that boosted the vehicle's power to 50 hp, with the compression ratio increased to 4.6, giving a maximum speed of 80 km / h.

== Variants ==
- GAZ-AAA: three-axle version
- BA-27: military vehicle using GAZ-AA assemblies
- GAZ-1: 16-seat bus version
- GAZ-2: 18-seat bus version
- GAZ-3 (later GAZ-03-30): 16-seat bus variant; basically a combination of the GAZ-1 and GAZ-2
- GAZ-03-32: ambulance version of GAZ-03-30
- GAZ-5: three-axle, 25-seat bus version
- GAZ-07: short wheelbase version for BA-6, BA-6M and BA-10
- GAZ-13: 13-seat bus version
  - GAZ-13B: modified GAZ-13
- GAZ-14: gas generator (wood gas) version with V-5 generator
- GAZ-40: prototype gas generator version, based on third-party developments of the V-5 and NATI-G11 generators
- GAZ-41: gas generator (wood gas) version with NATI-G14 generator
- GAZ-42: improved GAZ-41
  - GAZ-42M: modernized GAZ-42
- GAZ-43: gas generator (coal gas) version with NATI-G21 gas generator
- GAZ-44: compressed gas-fueled version
- GAZ-45: LPG fueled version
- GAZ-55 (initially GAZ-55-55): ambulance variant
- GAZ-55B: staff bus version of GAZ-55
- GAZ-60: half-track version made for the Red Army
- GAZ-60P: prototype improved version of GAZ-60
- GAZ-65: halftrack version with removable tracks
- GAZ-65op: prototype improved version of GAZ-65
- GAZ-66: prototype halftrack based on the GAZ-AAA
- GAZ-410 (initially GAZ-S1): dump truck
- GAZ-905: tractor version
- GAZ-SH: prototype snowmobile studies
- PMG-1: fire truck
