= GAZ-MM =

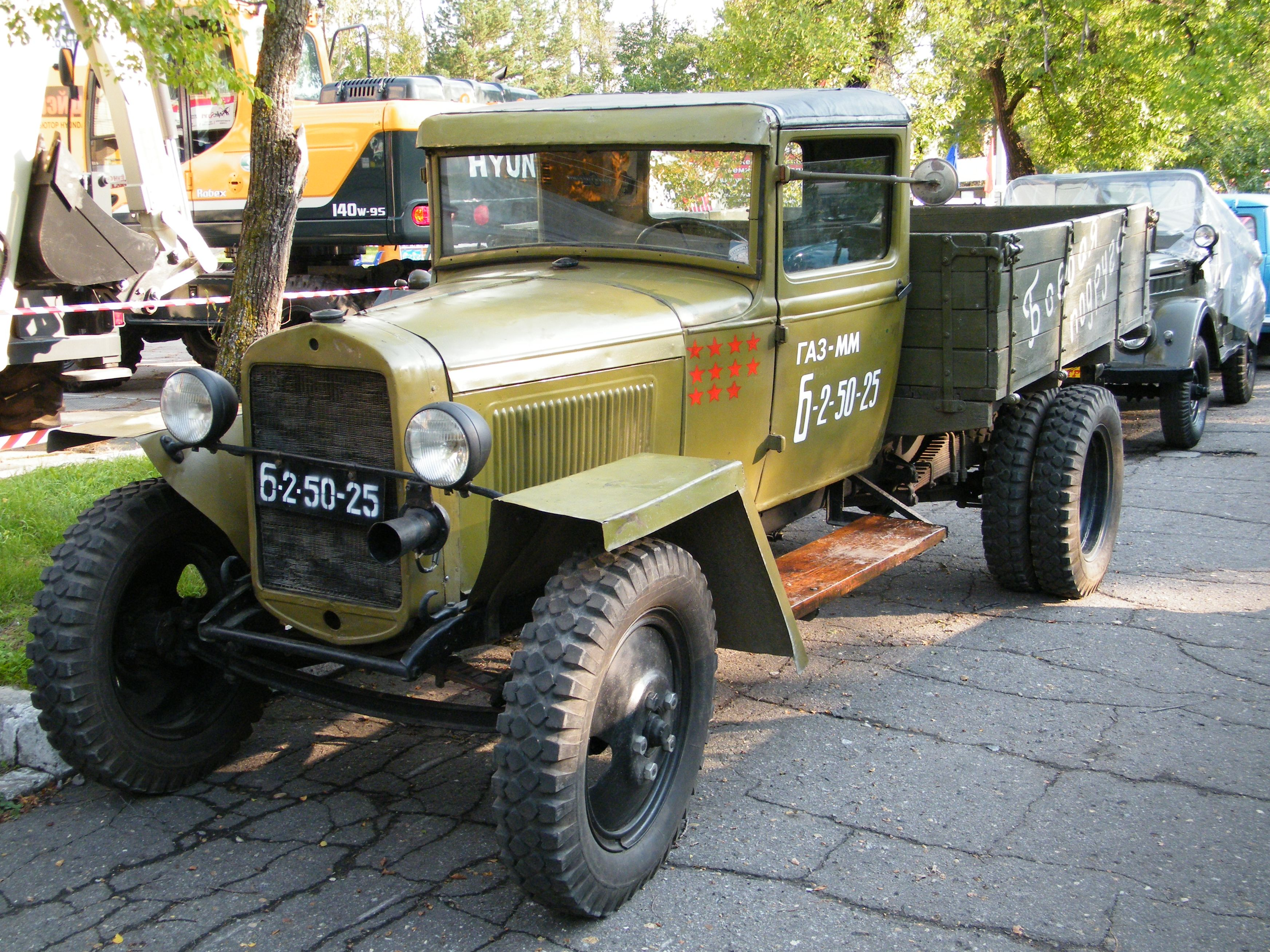

Overview
- Manufacturer: GAZ (1938–1947); UAZ (1947–1956)
- Production: 1938–1956

Body and chassis
- Class: Truck
- Layout: FR layout

Powertrain
- Engine: 3.3 L GAZ-M1 I4
- Transmission: 4-speed manual

Dimensions
- Wheelbase: 3,440 mm (135.4 in)
- Length: 5,335 mm (210.0 in)
- Width: 2,040 mm (80.3 in)
- Height: 1,970 mm (77.6 in)
- Curb weight: 1,810 kg (3,990 lb)

Chronology
- Predecessor: GAZ-AA
- Successor: GAZ-51

The GAZ-MM is a Soviet light truck produced at the Gorki Auto Plant from 1938 to 1947, and then at the Ulyanovsky Auto Plant up to 1956. The truck was a modernized and improved variant of the GAZ-AA that used the more powerful engine from the GAZ-M1, upgrading the vehicle's power to 50 hp. Other improvements included a reinforced suspension, alongside a new steering and cardan shaft. The styling also slightly changed, incorporating simple angular fenders, rather than the GAZ-AA's more rounded ones.

Due to some engine shortages at the factory, some believe that the actual mass-production of the GAZ-MM trucks only started in 1940, since the GAZ-M1 engine needed to get firstly used in the GAZ-AAA and BA-10 vehicles.

In 1942 a simplified variant of the truck, with the GAZ-MM-V index started getting produced, due to material shortages, but limited production of the original "unsimplified" GAZ-MM continued. In 1943 the second headlight was re-added, and a simplified wooden cabin with sliding door windows was created (GAZ-MM-86-120). After the Great Patriotic War ended, the production of all the variants of the GAZ-MM fully restarted, but by that time the Gorki plant was producing the newer GAZ-51 trucks and GAZ-M20 Pobeda cars, and so it seemed that the days of the GAZ-MM were starting to end, as GAZ wanted to free-up production capacity at their factory. Due to these reasons, the production of the GAZ-MM truck was transferred to the Ulyanovsky Auto Plant (UAZ), where production lasted until 1956.

== Variants ==
Most of the variants of the GAZ-MM were just modernized variants of the ones from the GAZ-AA series.

- GAZ-65: Prototype halftrack version. Produced in 1940.
- 4M GAZ-AAA: Anti-air truck fitted with quadruple 4M Maxim M1910 gun.
- 72-K GAZ-MM: Anti-air truck fitted with a 25 mm automatic air defense gun M1940 (72-K) cannon built during World War II.
- GAZ-55: ambulance version.
- GAZ-42: gas generator-powered version.
- GAZ-MM-V: simplified variant.
