= GAZ =

Russian manufacturer of commercial vehicles

Coordinates: 56°14′47.20″N 43°53′23.58″E

Gorky Automobile Plant

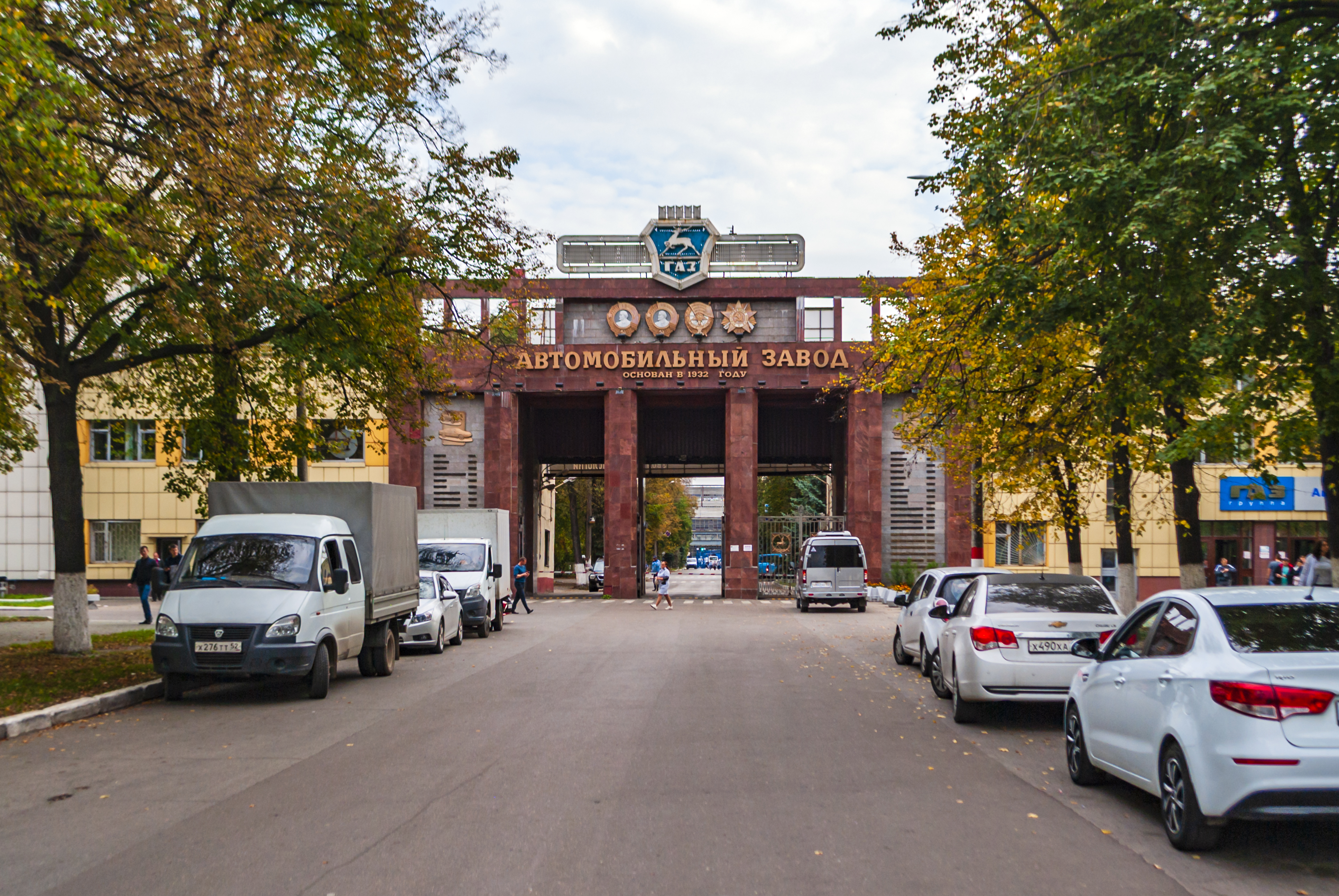
- GAZ plant site main entrance, 2019
- Native name: Го́рьковский автомоби́льный заво́д
- Type: Subsidiary
- Traded as: GAZ
- Industry: Automotive; Defense industry
- Founded: 1932; 94 years ago Nizhny Novgorod (named Gorky 1932–1990)
- Headquarters: Nizhny Novgorod, NIZ, Russia
- Key people: Vadim Sorokin (president & CEO of GAZ Group), Siegfried Wolf (chairman of the board, OJSC GAZ, Russian Machines), Manfred Eibeck (chief executive officer, Russian Machines)
- Products: Automobiles, automotive parts
- Revenue: $1.46 billion (2017)
- Operating income: $116 million (2017)
- Net income: $1.58 million (2017)
- Total assets: $1.02 billion (2017)
- Total equity: $43.2 million (2017)
- Owner: Oleg Deripaska
- Parent: GAZ Group
- Subsidiaries: LDV (2006-2008)
- Website: os-automotive.com

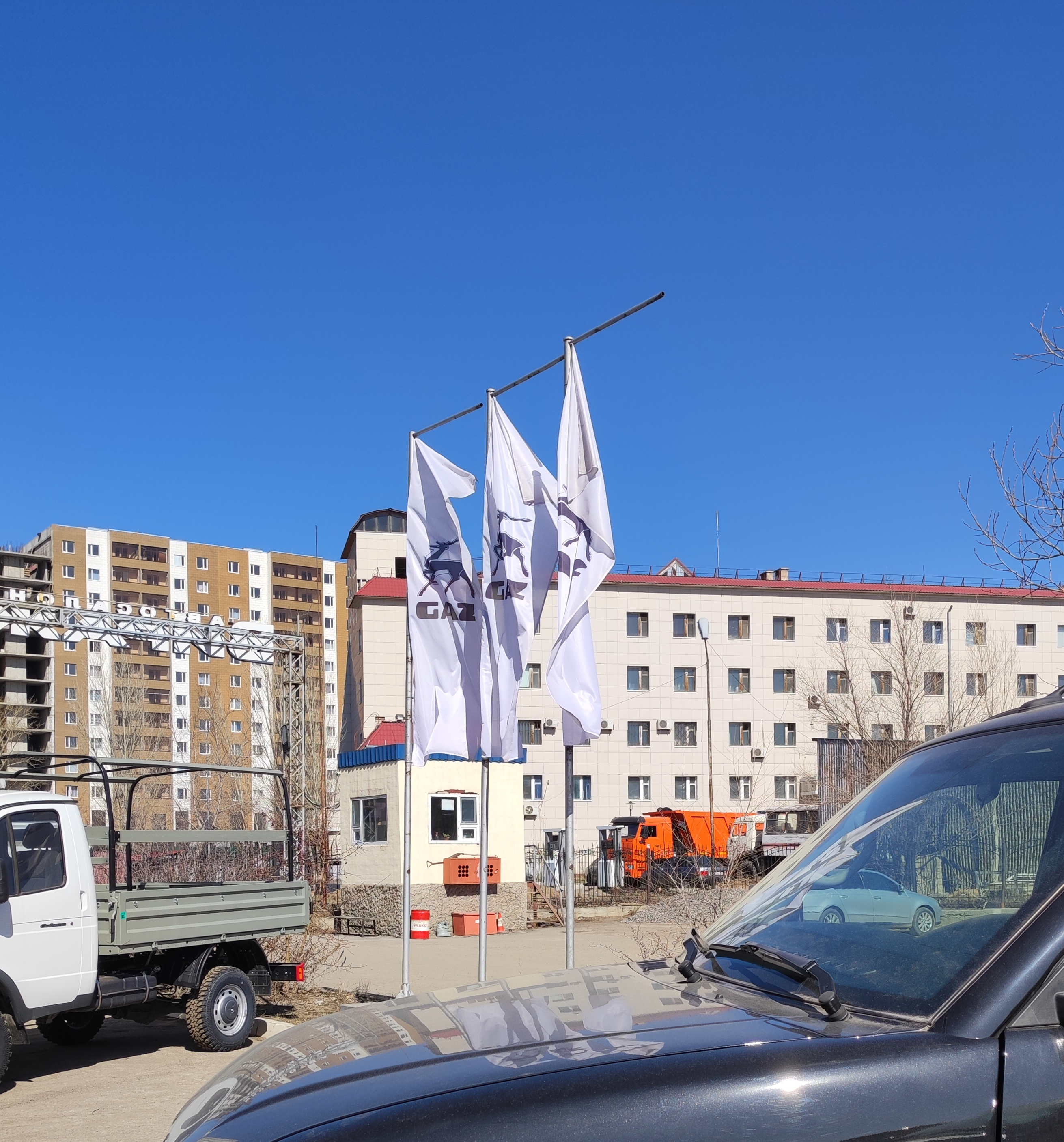
Horizontal flags featuring the GAZelle logo near a GAZelle car shop in Astana

GAZ (Gorkovsky avtomobilny zavod, Russian: ГАЗ, Го́рьковский автомоби́льный заво́д, lit. 'Gorky Automobile Plant') is a Russian automobile manufacturer based in Nizhny Novgorod, a city known as Gorky from 1932 to 1990. Established in 1932 as the Nizhny Novgorod Automobile Plant with technical assistance from the Ford Motor Company, it adopted the name GAZ in 1933 when the city was renamed Gorky. It has produced passenger cars, trucks, buses, military vehicles, armored vehicles, and light commercial vehicles.

In the post-Soviet period (from 1991), GAZ shifted its focus toward light commercial vehicles and entered into contract manufacturing agreements with the companies Volkswagen, General Motors, and Mercedes-Benz.

== History ==
=== Early history ===
In May 1929 the Soviet Union signed an agreement with the American Ford Motor Company. Under its terms, the Soviets agreed to purchase $13 million worth of automobiles and parts, while Ford agreed to give technical assistance until 1938 to construct an integrated automobile-manufacturing plant at Nizhny Novgorod. The factory was founded and production started on 1 January 1932. At the time the factory was known as Nizhny Novgorod Automobile Plant, short NAZ (Nizhegorodskiy avtomobilny zavod), full name Nizhny Novgorod Automobile Plant named after V. M. Molotov (Nizhegorodskiy avtomobilny zavod imeni V. M. Molotova), after the Soviet minister Vyacheslav Molotov. In 1932 the plant produced its first automobiles, GAZ-AA (originally known as NAZ-AA, as they were manufactured before Nizhny Novgorod became Gorky) truck and GAZ-A passenger car (manufactured after Nizhny Novgorod became Gorky). The cars were based on the Ford Model AA and Ford Model A, respectively.

In 1933, the factory's name changed to Gorkovsky avtomobilny zavod, or GAZ, when the city was renamed after Maxim Gorky.

The GAZ-A was succeeded by the more modern GAZ-M1 (based largely on the four-cylinder version of the Ford Model B), produced from 1936 to 1942. The M letter stands for Molotovets ('of Molotov's fame'), it was the origin of the car's nickname, M'ka (эмка).

During the war, GAZ assembled Chevrolet G7107 and G7117 (G7107 with winch) from parts shipped from the US under Lend Lease.

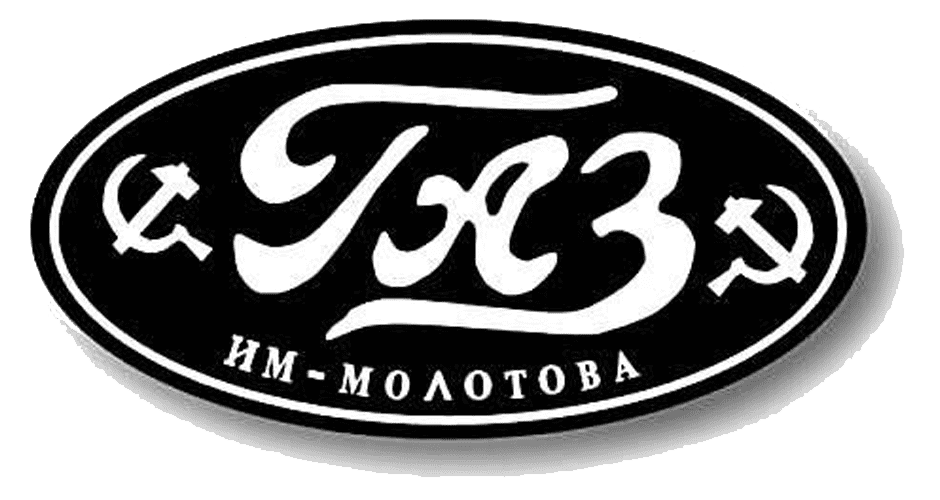
GAZ logo

Ford logo

=== Postwar period ===
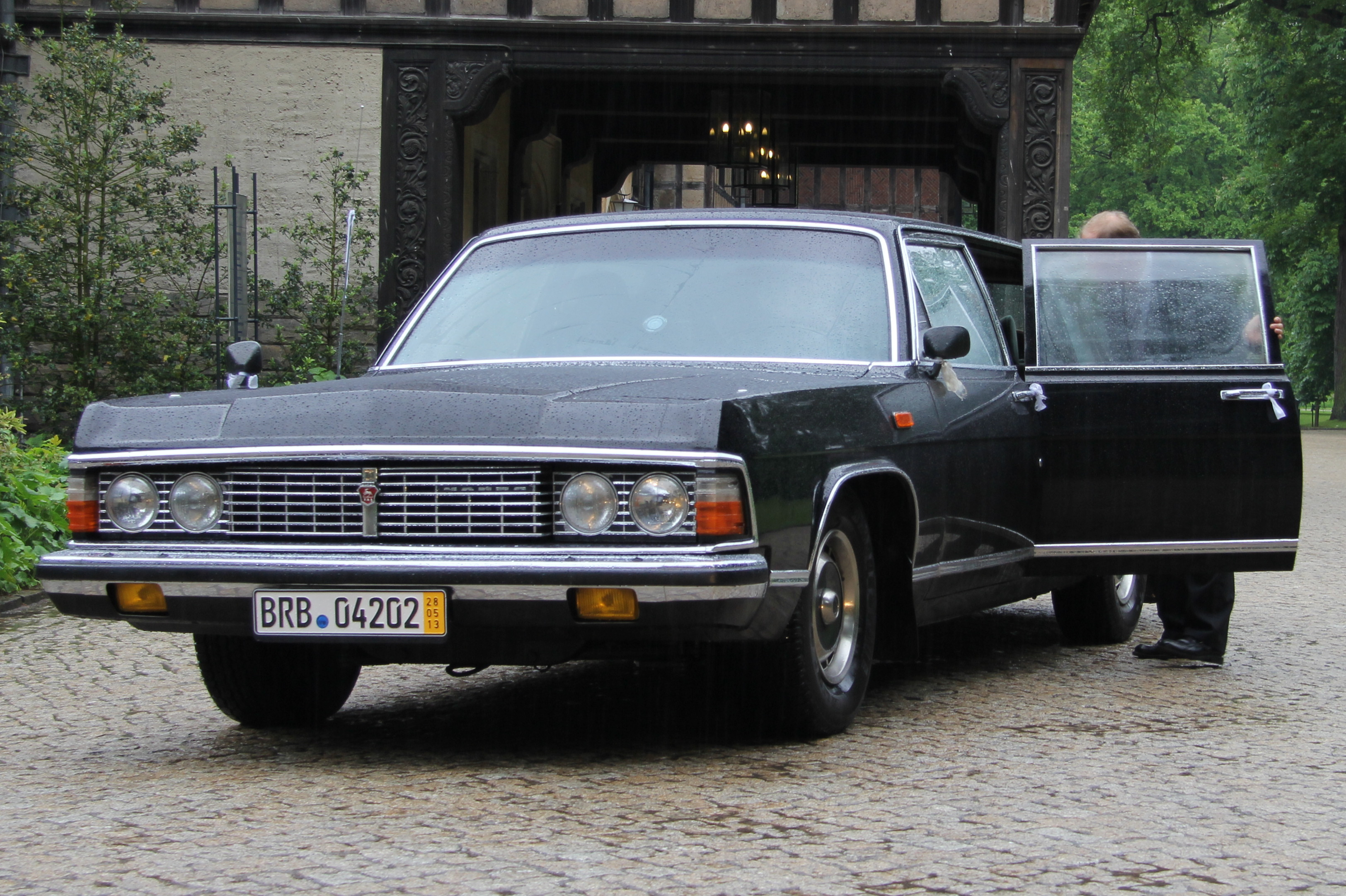
GAZ-14, produced 1977–1988

At that time, GAZ engineers worked to develop an all-new car model to enter production once hostilities ended. Called the GAZ-M20 Pobeda (Victory), this affordably-priced sedan with streamlined, fastback styling, entered production in 1946 and was produced by GAZ until 1958. (Licensed production under the name Warszawa continued in Polish FSO until the 1970s). It was the first Soviet car with electric windshield wipers (rather than mechanical- or vacuum-operated ones).

GAZ also made GAZ-12 ZIM, GAZ-21 and GAZ-24 Volga and the luxury cars GAZ-13 and GAZ-14 Chaika. The ZIM was the first GAZ car to feature the leaping deer hood ornament. The GAZ-21 made its public debut in 1955, with three cars on a demonstration drive from Moscow to the Crimea, two automatic models and a manual. It was launched in 1956 and became a symbol of the whole Soviet epoch. The car offered front seats able to fold flat and came standard with cigarette lighter and a radio at a time when most American-built cars did not have a radio. A small number of Volgas with the 195 hp (145 kW; 198 PS) Chaika engine, automatic transmission, and power steering were built for the KGB as the M23, 603 were built in 1962–1970. As the car's leading engineer Boris Dekhtyar recalled, the new version of the Volga had improved brake pads and reached a higher top speed of over 170 km/h; it was well received. The new engine produced 195 h.p. at 4,400 rpm.

Furthermore, GAZ produced several armored military vehicles, particularly during World War II and the early Cold War. These included the BA-64, a light armored reconnaissance car based on the GAZ-64 jeep and armed with a 7.62 mm DT machine gun, with over 9,000 units built between 1942 and 1946; the BA-6, an earlier heavy armored car equipped with a 45 mm gun and based on a six-wheeled truck chassis; and the BA-20, a light armored car built on the GAZ-M1 chassis, primarily used for communications and reconnaissance in the early stages of World War II. Another notable model was the BA-3, a six-wheeled armored car with a 45 mm main gun and heavy armor, considered one of the most powerful armored cars of the interwar period. In the postwar years, GAZ developed the BTR-40, an open-topped armored personnel carrier with capacity for up to 8 troops, and the BTR-152, a larger and more robust APC introduced in 1950, both of which became widely exported throughout the Eastern Bloc.

In the 1960s GAZ plant renewed its truck range by launching such models as GAZ-52, GAZ-53А and GAZ-66. In the 1960s and 1970s, the plant was overhauled and updated; 1962 saw it fitted with the Soviet Union's first automated precision shop. In 1994 the plant started production of GAZelle light commercial vehicles.

The plant became AvtoGAZ, with the integration of its various subcontractors, on 24 August 1971; the same year, it was awarded the Order of Lenin. GAZ produced its ten millionth vehicle in March 1981. In the late 1990s GAZ was deemed to be the best managed Russian automotive manufacturer.

=== SibAl takeover ===
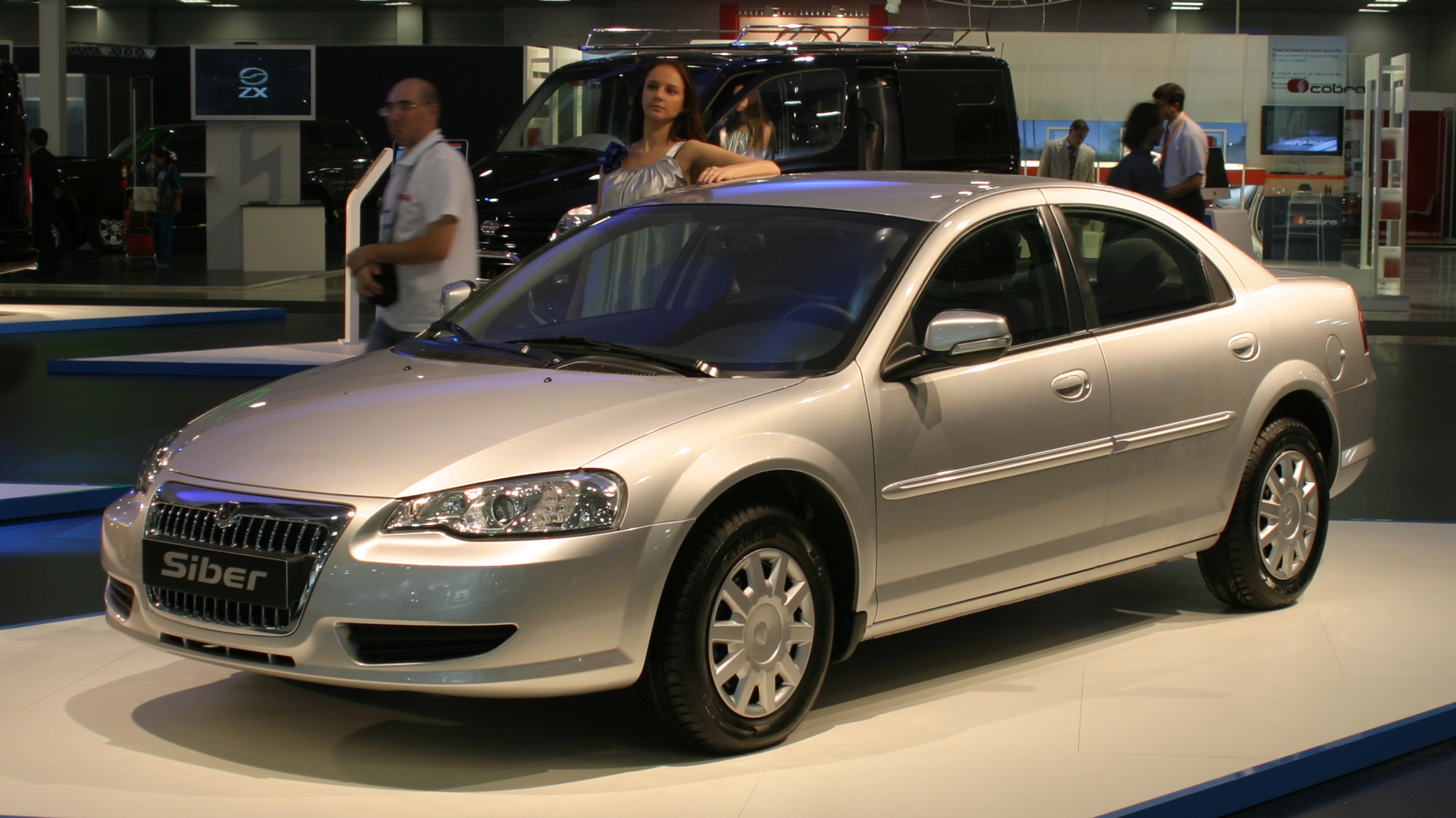
GAZ Volga Siber, introduced in 2008

In November 2000 GAZ was acquired in a hostile takeover by SibAl. In March 2003 GAZ declared that the production of passenger cars was no longer a priority for the company, and plans to release a new GAZ-3115 model had been abandoned.

In 2006, GAZ made a move on the LDV company based in Birmingham, England, and acquired the van maker from the venture capital group Sun European Partners, LLP in July of that year. GAZ said that they planned to market the MAXUS (LDV's new Panel-van that was released in January 2005) into the rest of Europe and Asia. GAZ proposed to increase production in the LDV plant in England, while also commencing production of the MAXUS in a new plant in Russia. However, due to the recession, the production at the LDV plant was halted and the plant was sold to a Chinese company called ECO Concept in 2009.

As then DaimlerChrysler modernized its Sterling Heights Assembly plant in 2006, the old Chrysler Sebring / Dodge Stratus assembly line and tooling was sold to GAZ and was shipped to Nizhny Novgorod in Russia. Since then GAZ car facility is used for contract manufacturing for Volkswagen and General Motors.

=== Andersson leadership ===
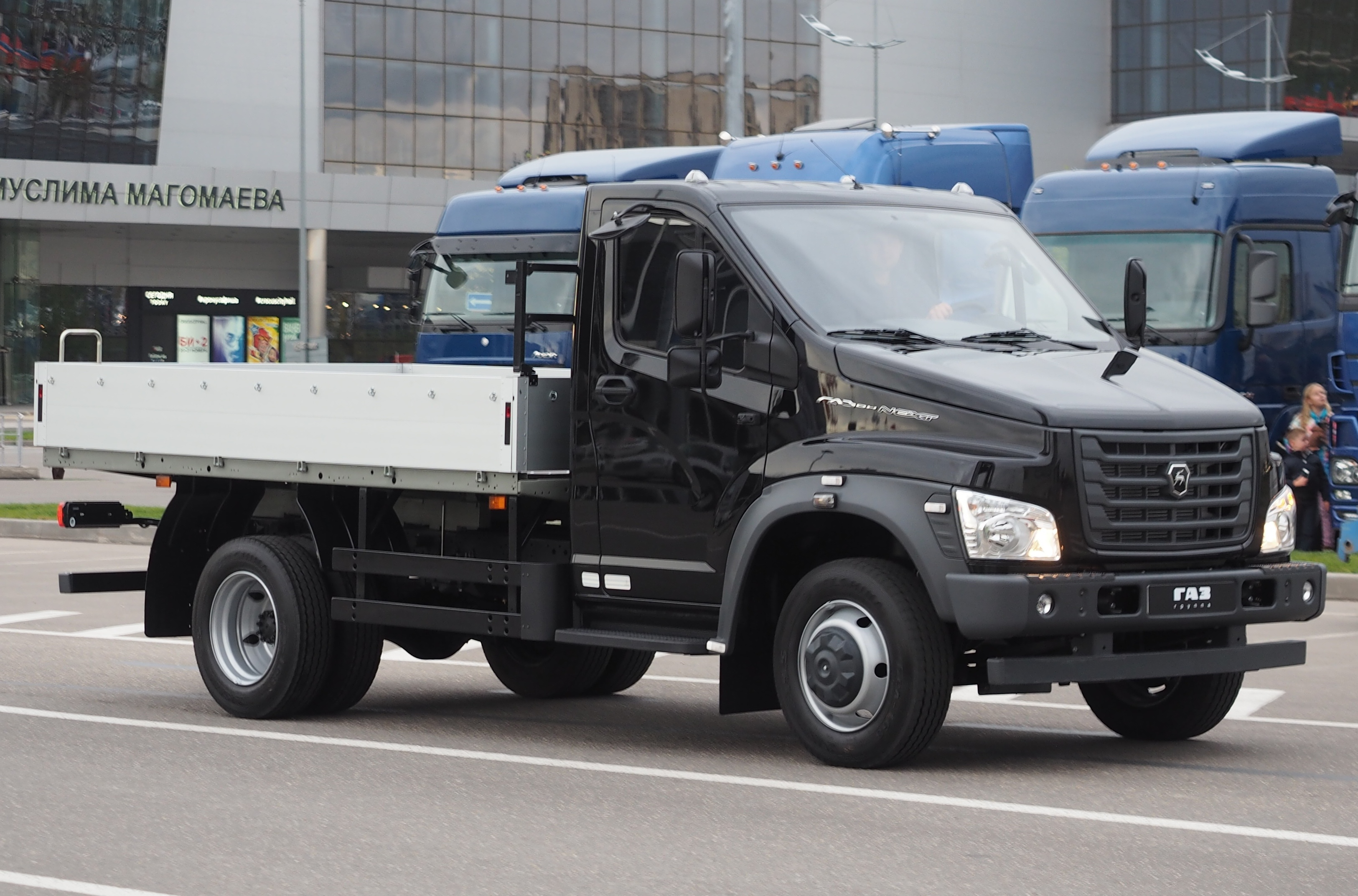
GAZon Next flatbed truck, produced since 2014

In 2009, Bo Andersson, former Vice-President of General Motors, was invited to become a President/CEO of GAZ Group.

In 2010, GAZ upgraded its model range by launching new GAZelle-BUSINESS lineup with diesel and petrol engines and LPG equipment.

In November 2010 the company decided to end production of the Volga Siber, its last GAZ passenger car model, and to discontinue the GAZ Volga range. In December 2010, GAZ Group signed a memorandum of understanding with Daimler on contract manufacturing of Mercedes-Benz Sprinter at GAZ plant in Nizhny Novgorod. It is expected that production will start in 2013.

In February 2011, General Motors and GAZ Group signed an agreement on contract assembly of the new Chevrolet Aveo car at GAZ plant in Nizhny Novgorod. As of December 2012, production was underway with an expected annual production of 30,000 vehicles.

In June 2011, Volkswagen Group Rus and GAZ Group signed a long-term agreement on contract manufacturing at GAZ plant with total investment of €200 million. It is planned to produce Škoda Yeti, the new Volkswagen Jetta and Škoda Octavia. The total production volume in the peak years will be about 110,000 vehicles. In November 2011, under the contract manufacturing agreement, GAZ started SKD assembly of Škoda Yeti; full-cycle production started in December 2012.

=== Recent developments ===
In April 2019, GAZ asked for a $468 million bailout from the Russian government, saying that US sanctions on Oleg Deripaska and his assets put the company at risk of default. On July 4, 2019, workers from GAZ protested against the US sanctions in front of the US embassy in Moscow as an opposition to measures they claim will lead to the bankruptcy of the company.

In November 2021, "GAZ Group" announced that its division, "Silovye Agregaty", would be ready for mass production of hydrogen engines in 2.5 years.

== See also ==
- List of GAZ vehicles
- Automobile model numbering system in the Soviet Union and Russia
- History of Ford Motor Company
