= FAI armoured car =

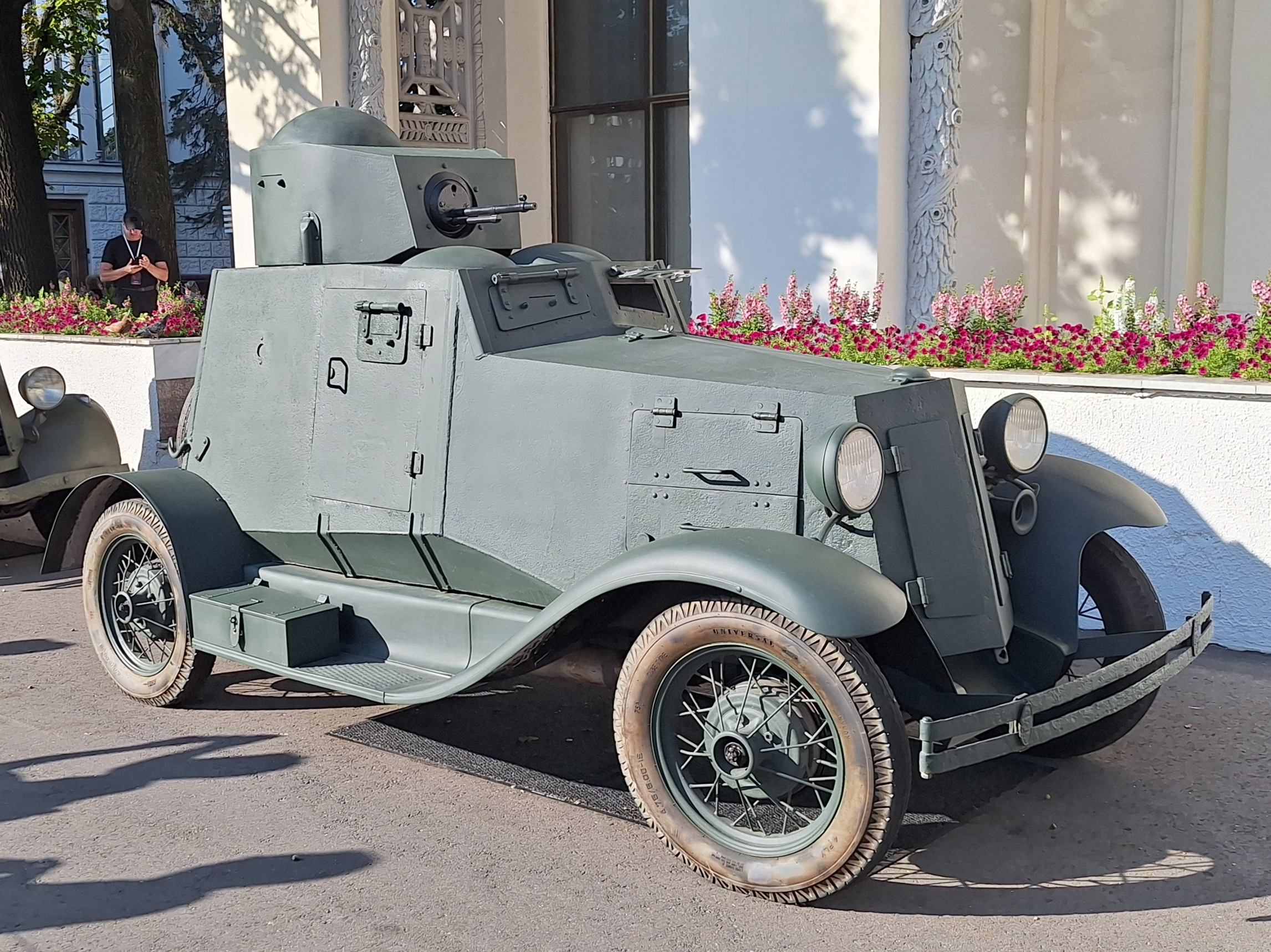
- Type: Armoured car
- Place of origin: Soviet Union

Service history
- In service: 1933–41
- Used by: Soviet Union
- Wars: Spanish Civil War; Battles of Khalkhin Gol; World War II

Production history
- Designer: Izhorskiy Zavod
- Designed: 1931–32
- Produced: 1933–35

Specifications (FAI)
- Mass: 1.75 tonnes (1.93 short tons)
- Length: 3.69 m (12.1 ft)
- Width: 1.73 m (5.7 ft)
- Height: 2.07 m (6.8 ft)
- Crew: 2
- Armor: 4–6 mm
- Main armament: 7.62 mm DT machine gun (1512 rds.)
- Engine: GAZ-A L-head I4; 42 hp
- Suspension: wheeled
- Fuel capacity: 40 L
- Operational range: 190–230 km (120–140 miles)
- Maximum speed: 83.1 km/h (51.6 mph)

The FAI (Ford-A Izhorskiy) armoured car was a replacement for the D-8 armoured car, used by the Soviet Union from the early 1930s to early 1940s.

== Description ==
The FAI (Ford-A-Izhorskiy) was built on the chassis of the GAZ-A car, a licensed copy of the American Ford A. The chief engineer of GAZ, Ni.I. Dyrenkov, was tasked in 1932 for an armored car that was larger and more robust than the D-8 armored car and D-12 armored car, and was to be fitted with a turret capable of 360° rotation. It was made of a welded construction when most vehicles of this time had rivets, and the tires were filled with cork so that they could run flat. The GAZ-A chassis was the major weakness of the FAI, as it was a commercial vehicle chassis and thus not strong enough to carry a lot of armour or firepower for use on the battlefield, so the FAI had thin armor, was vulnerable to mines, and had only a single 7.62 mm DT machine-gun for offensive capability, housed in the turret. While relatively fast moving on roads, it performed poorly off-road, had a low maximum speed, and the 40 liter fuel tank gave it a limited operational range. Thus, the FAI was built in relatively small numbers before being replaced by the very similar BA-20.

After the BA-20 was introduced in 1935, around 300 FAI hulls were still stored in warehouses. Rather than scrap the hulls, instead they were mounted on the GAZ-M1 chassis, the same as the BA-20, and designated FAI-M. A new 50 hp engine and 60 liter gas tank was installed, giving the FAI-M a max speed of 90 kph and an operational range of 315 km.

The FAI and BA-20 are often mistaken for each other. One major difference is that the FAI has two dome-shaped armoured covers over the driver and co-driver's positions, whereas the roof on the BA-20 in this area is flat. Seen from the rear or side, the cabin of the FAI also only extends to just ahead of the rear axle centerline, leaving a significant flat shelf in the trunk area, where the spare wheel is mounted horizontally. The BA-20 the cabin extends further to the rear, with a much smaller shelf and the wheel mounted vertically on the rear of the cabin.

== Operational use ==
The FAI was used on almost all fronts by the Soviet Union from 1934 to 1943, including in the Far Eastern Front. They also served in the Spanish Civil War and in the Winter War. Three cars were captured by Finland and given the designation BAB A. Some were captured by the Germans, one of which was destroyed during the Warsaw Uprising. By the end of 1941 most had been destroyed. One surviving (damaged) example is on display at the Polish Army Museum. An FAI-M was found in a swamp near Novgorod. It was restored to running condition by the RKKA Military History Club and was shown at "Exotic Vehicles '98" in Tushino, Moscow.

== Variants ==
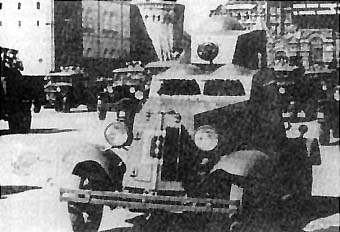
FAI at the parade on Red Square.

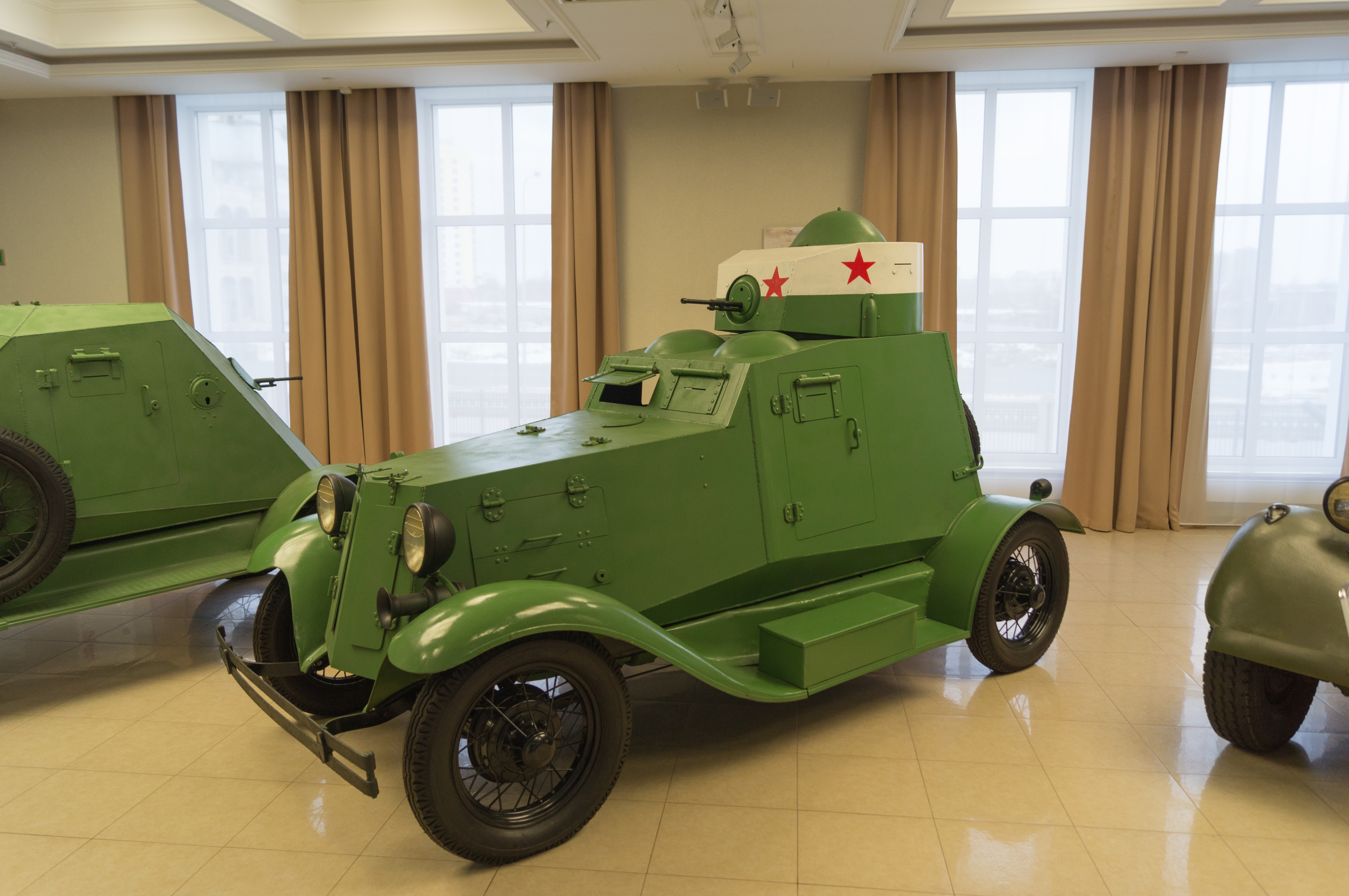
Detailed replica in UMMC Museum Complex

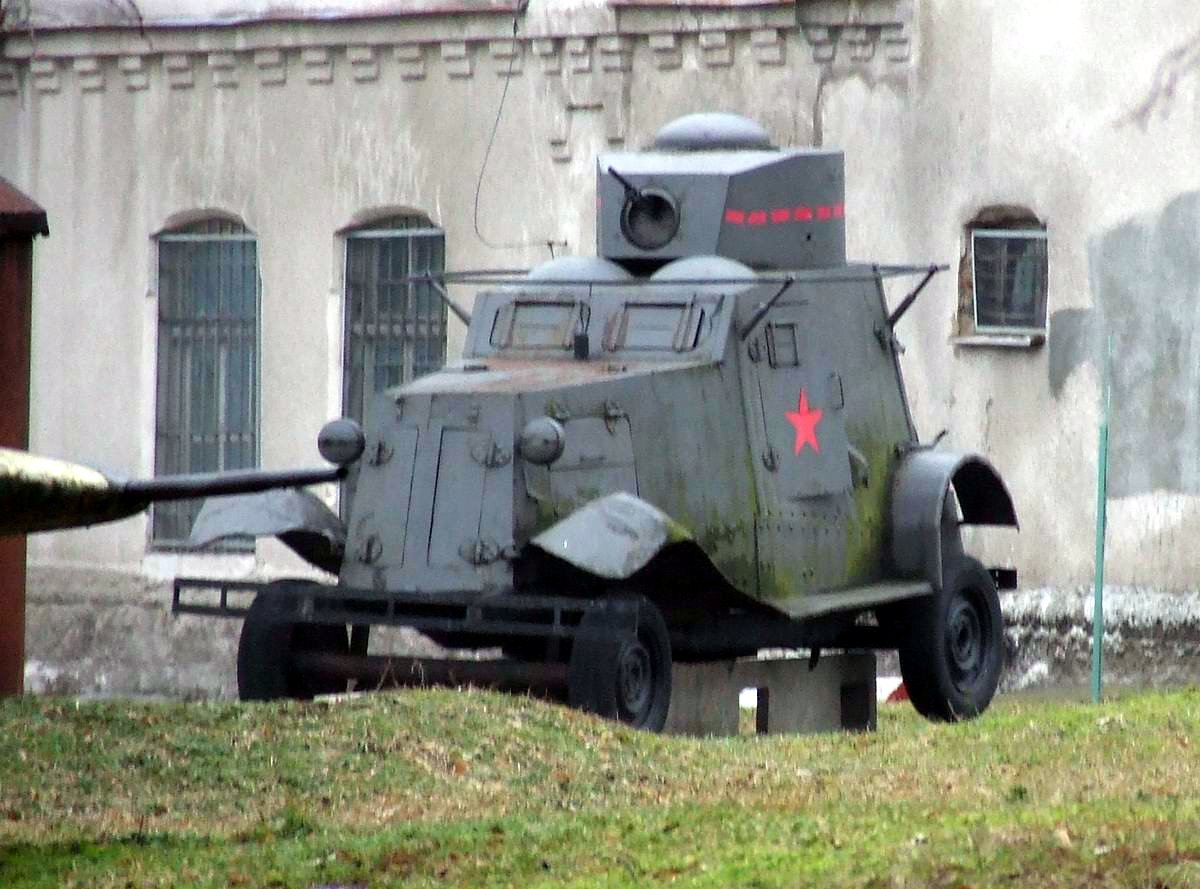
FAI-M replica on UAZ-469 chassis, fake machine gun and fake frame aerial (real FAI never had radio), stored at Border Guard Barracks in Białystok, Poland
- FAI (ФАИ, «Форд-А, Ижорский»). The FAI was built on the chassis of the GAZ-A car, a licensed copy of the US Ford A with 40 L fuel tank.
- FAI-M (ФАИ-М, «ФАИ-Модернизированный») - upgraded variant, since 1938. The FAI-M was converted from the chassis of the newer GAZ-M1 car with 60 L fuel tank, using spare upper hulls.
- FAI-ZhD (ФАИ-жд, «ФАИ-железнодорожный») - From 1933 on, small numbers (only 9 were made) of FAI-ZhD were produced. FAI-ZhD was a modification for additional railway usage. The speed on rails was 85 km/h forward and 24 km/h reverse. The road speed was 40 km/h. The changing of modes took the crew 30 minutes.
- GAZ-TK (ГАЗ-ТК, «ГАЗ-Трёхосный, Курчевского») - The armoured car was built on the chassis of the GAZ-AAA and equipped with 71-ТК radio. Only one prototype was made in 1934 - 1935.

== Users ==
- Soviet Union

- Red Army (1933–45)
- Soviet Border Troops - 30 (1935–41)

- (Mongolia) Mongolian People's Republic - 15 (since 1936)
- Second Spanish Republic - 20
- Nazi Germany - The Germans used at least one captured FAI-M.

== Sources ==
- М. В. Коломиец. Лёгкие бронеавтомобили Красной Армии довоенной постройки ("Фронтовая иллюстрация" № 2 2007). – М.: ООО "Стратегия КМ", 2007.
