= BA-20 =

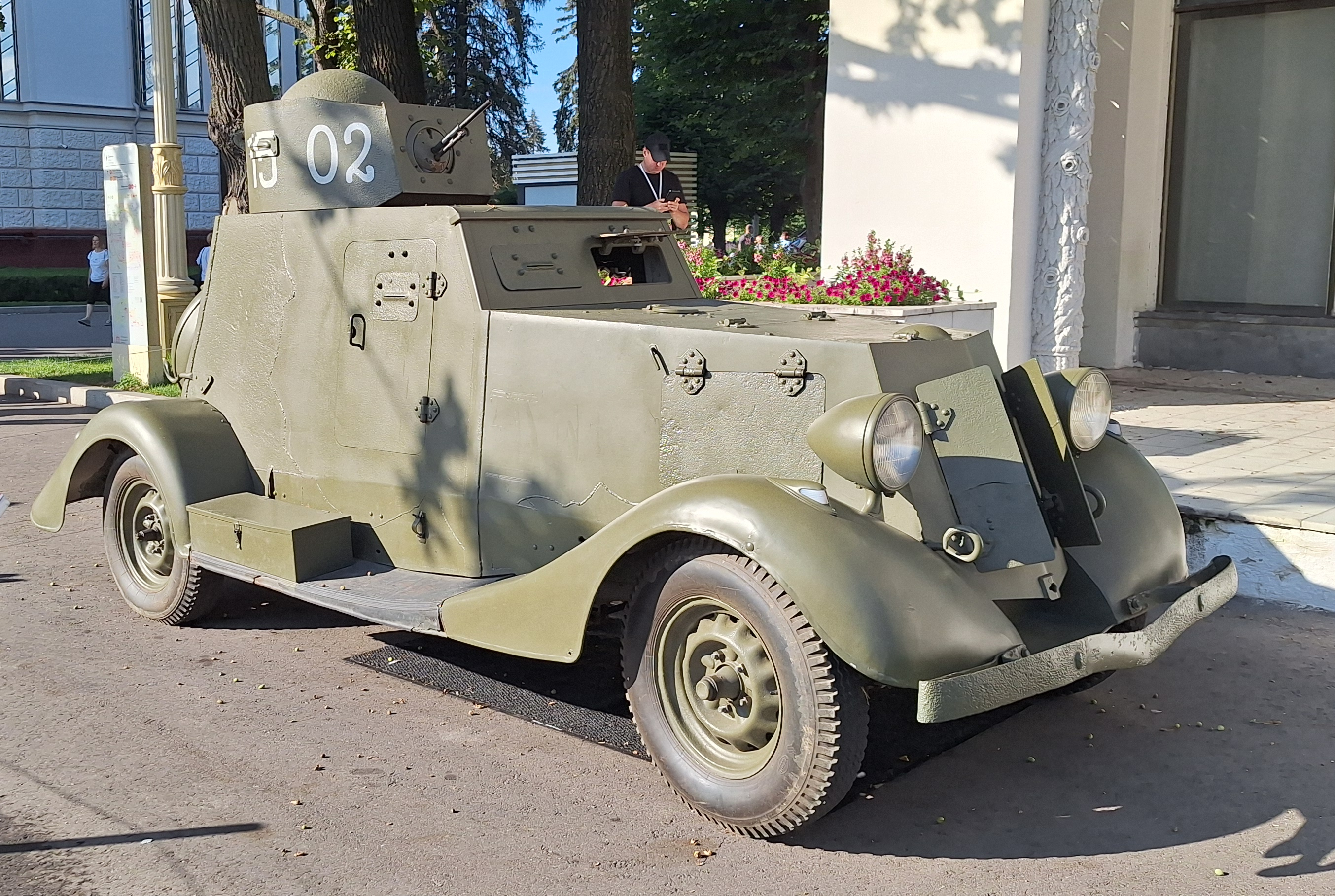
- Type: Armored car
- Place of origin: Soviet Union

Service history
- In service: 1936-1945
- Used by: Soviet Union; Spanish Second Republic; Spanish Nationalists (captured); Finland (captured); Nazi Germany (captured)
- Wars: Spanish Civil War; Soviet–Japanese border conflicts Winter War; World War II

Production history
- No. built: 2,066

Specifications
- Mass: 2.27 tonnes
- Length: 4.31 m (14 ft 2 in)
- Width: 1.74 m (5 ft 9 in)
- Height: 2.13 m (7 ft 0 in)
- Crew: 2-3
- Armor: 6-9 mm
- Main armament: 7.62 mm DT machine gun
- Engine: GAZ-M1; 50 hp (37 kW)
- Power/weight: 20 hp/tonne
- Suspension: wheeled
- Operational range: 350 km (220 mi)
- Maximum speed: 80 km/h (50 mph)

The BA-20 (Russian: Broneavtomobil 20) was an armored car developed in the Soviet Union in 1934. It was intended to replace the FAI and its field trials were completed in 1935. The BA-20 was then used in the early stages of World War II.

== Design and production ==
The BA-20 armored car was developed in 1934 for use by HQ staffs, reconnaissance and communications units. It was derived from the civilian GAZ-M1 car using its chassis, which was itself a modified version of a Ford design, produced by the Nizhny Novgorod-based vehicle manufacturer GAZ. Full production of the BA-20 started in 1935. The chassis was built at the Nizhny Novgorod factory; the body was built at the Vyksinskiy plant, where final assembly of the BA-20 occurred as well.

== Service ==
Children climbing on a BA-20 arriving from the front. Leningrad, April 1943.

The principal use of the BA-20 was as a scout vehicle. The BA-20's tires were designed to be resistant to bullets and shrapnel by the simple expedient of filling them with spongey rubber. A variant, the BA-20ZhD, could travel on railway lines by replacing the normal wheels with flanged metal rail-type wheels.

The vehicle was exported to the Spanish Republican side in the Spanish Civil War, although the vast majority of BA-20s built served with the Soviet Red Army. They first saw combat in the conflict with Japan in 1939 on the Khalkin Gol river in Mongolia (see Battle of Khalkin Gol). The BA-20 was used by the Red Army in the Soviet invasion of Poland later in 1939 and the Winter War against Finland between 1939 and 1940 in which Finland captured 18 designating them as BAB B, as well as the early stages of Operation Barbarossa in 1941. Production was ended that same year, with some 2066 BA-20s having been constructed by that time.

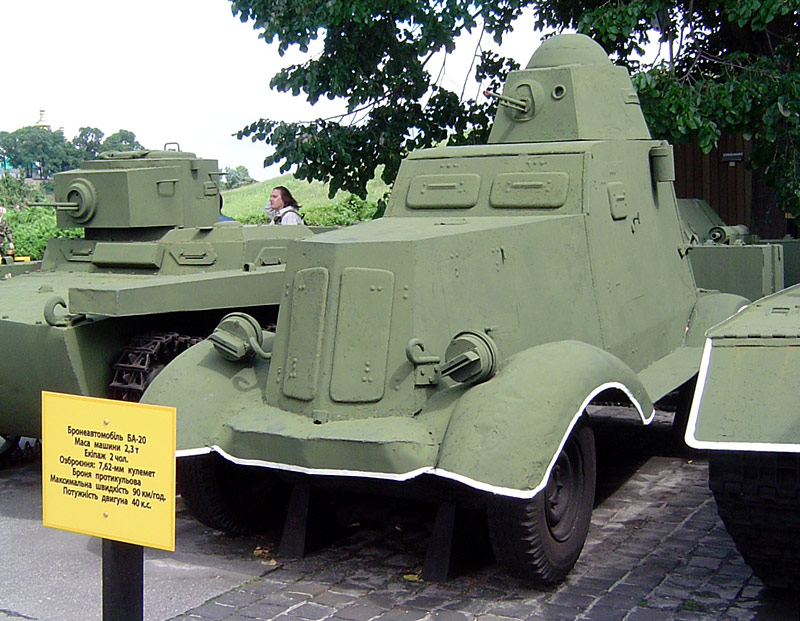
Soviet BA-20 armored car.

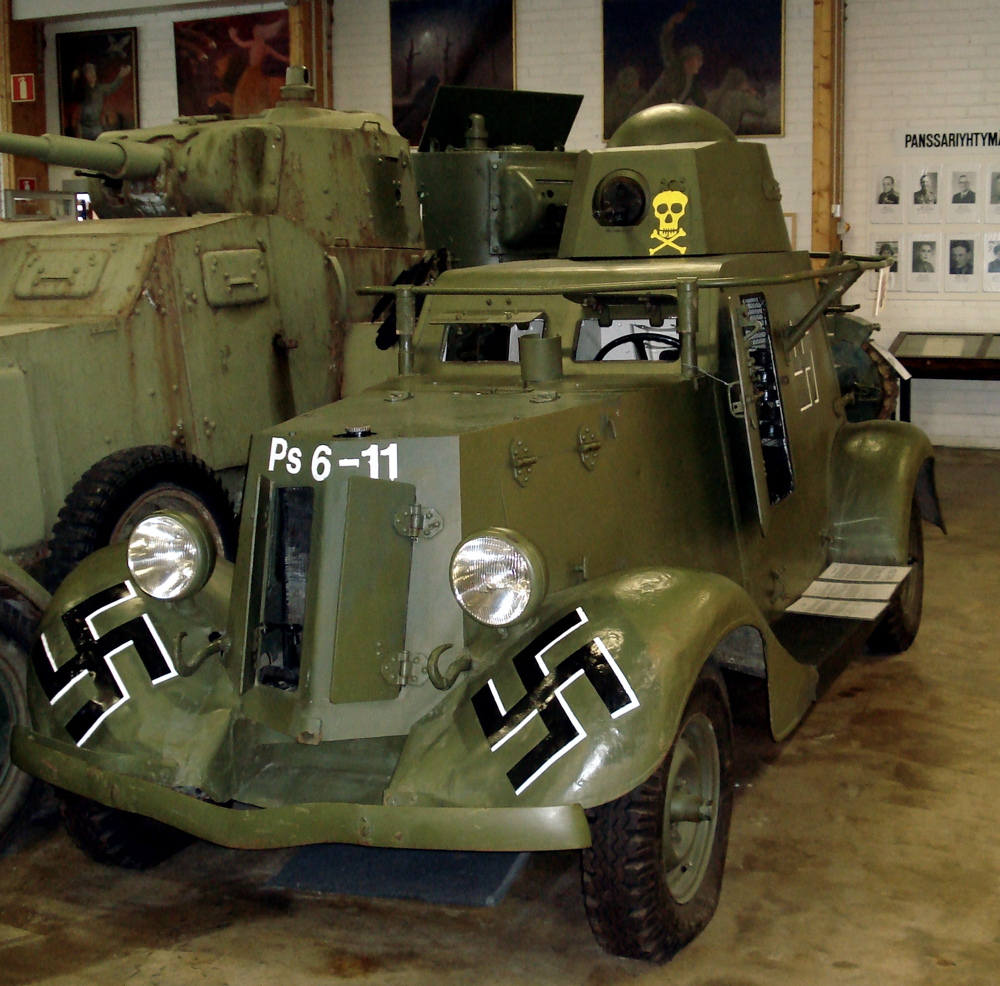
Captured by the Finnish, a Soviet BA-20 armored car with Finnish markings, at the Parola Tank Museum Finland

In common with most armored cars derived from civilian car models, the BA-20 was largely roadbound. The lack of all-wheel drive, high ground pressure, and low power prevented it from moving cross-country except on very firm ground. The armor was too thin to stop anything other than fragments or small-arms fire, and the 7.62 mm machine gun was not adequate to penetrate other scout vehicles. The Red Army produced very few wheeled armored fighting vehicles in the war, but replaced the BA-20 with the BA-64.

== Mistaken identification ==
The BA-20 is often mistaken for the very similar FAI armoured car. The main recognition feature is the flat roof of the BA-20; the FAI has two dome-shaped covers over the driver's and co-driver's stations. Early BA-20s (built in 1936–37) had the same vertical-sided turret as the FAI, although most vehicles had a conical-shaped turret.

== Variants and further development ==
- BA-20, initial production; command version has clothes-rail antenna. 749 built.
- BA-20M, improved version (9 mm thick armor, upgraded suspension); command version has whip antenna. 1180 built.
- BA-20ZhD, railroad scout car with replaceable flanged wheels. 137 built, 76 of them with BA-20M improvements.
- BA-21, prototype only, 1938
- LB-23, prototype only, 1939
