= GAZ-12 ZIM =

ZIM-12
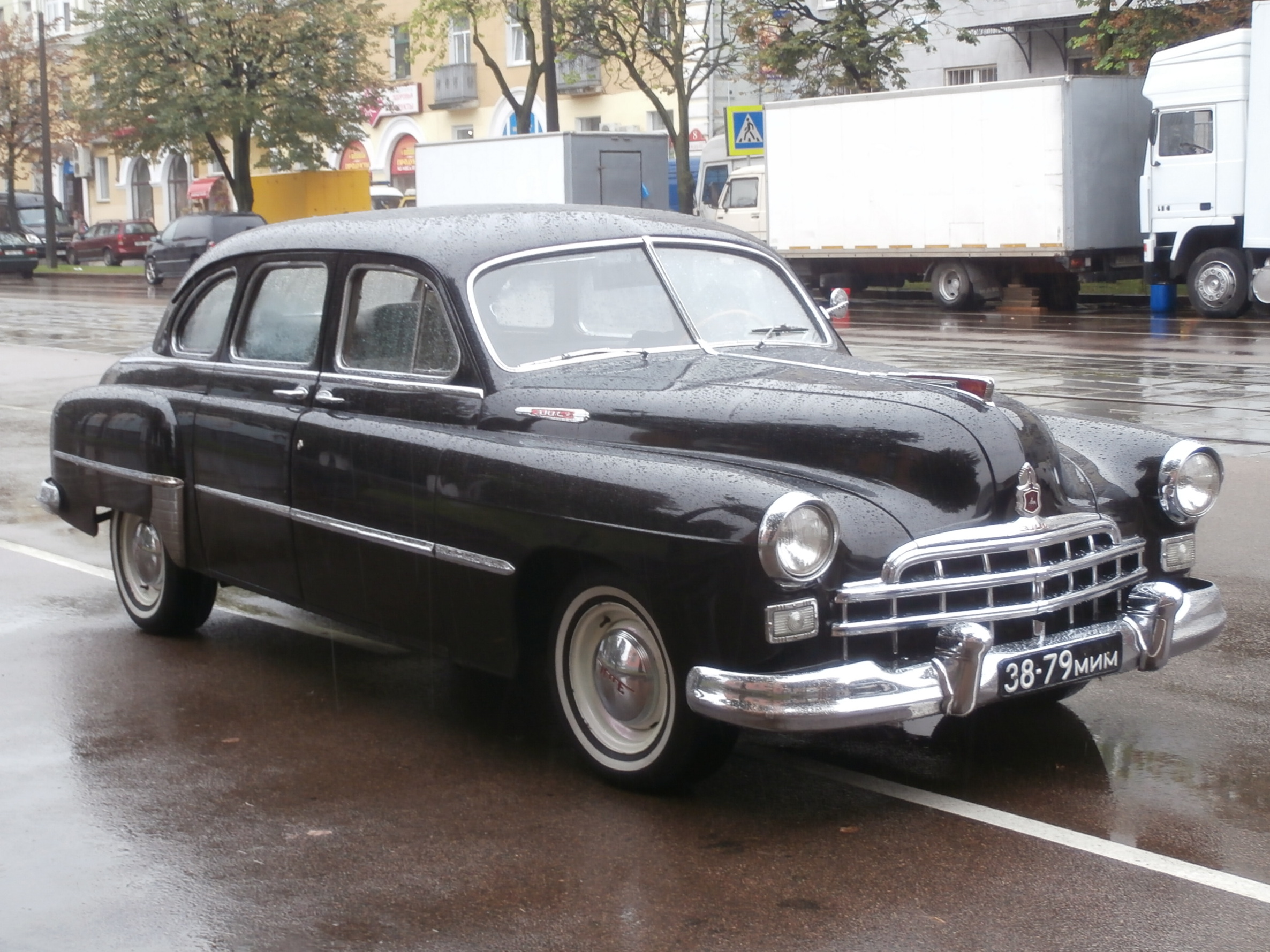

Overview
- Manufacturer: GAZ
- Also called: GAZ-12 (1958–1960)
- Production: 1950–1960
- Assembly: Soviet Union: Gorky
- Designer: Andrey Lipgart

Body and chassis
- Class: Full-size luxury car
- Body style: Sedan, phaeton and ambulance
- Layout: FR layout

Powertrain
- Engine: 3.5 L GAZ-12 I6
- Transmission: 3-speed manual with a hydrodynamic fluid coupling

Dimensions
- Wheelbase: 3,200 mm (126.0 in)
- Length: 5,530 mm (217.7 in)
- Width: 1,900 mm (74.8 in)
- Height: 1,660 mm (65.4 in)
- Curb weight: 3,800–4,200 lb (1,700–1,900 kg)

Chronology
- Predecessor: GAZ-11-73
- Successor: GAZ-13 Chaika

The ZIM-12 (Russian: ЗИМ-12) was a Soviet full-size luxury car produced by the Gorky Automotive Plant (GAZ) from 1950 until 1960. It was the first luxury car produced by GAZ and the first one to have the famous leaping gazelle hood ornament. The car was built to serve high and medium rank Soviet nomenklatura, but was also readily available as a taxi and ambulance. Unlike its successors, ZIM was the only Soviet executive class full-size car that was actually made available for private ownership. A total of 21,527 examples were built.

== Development ==
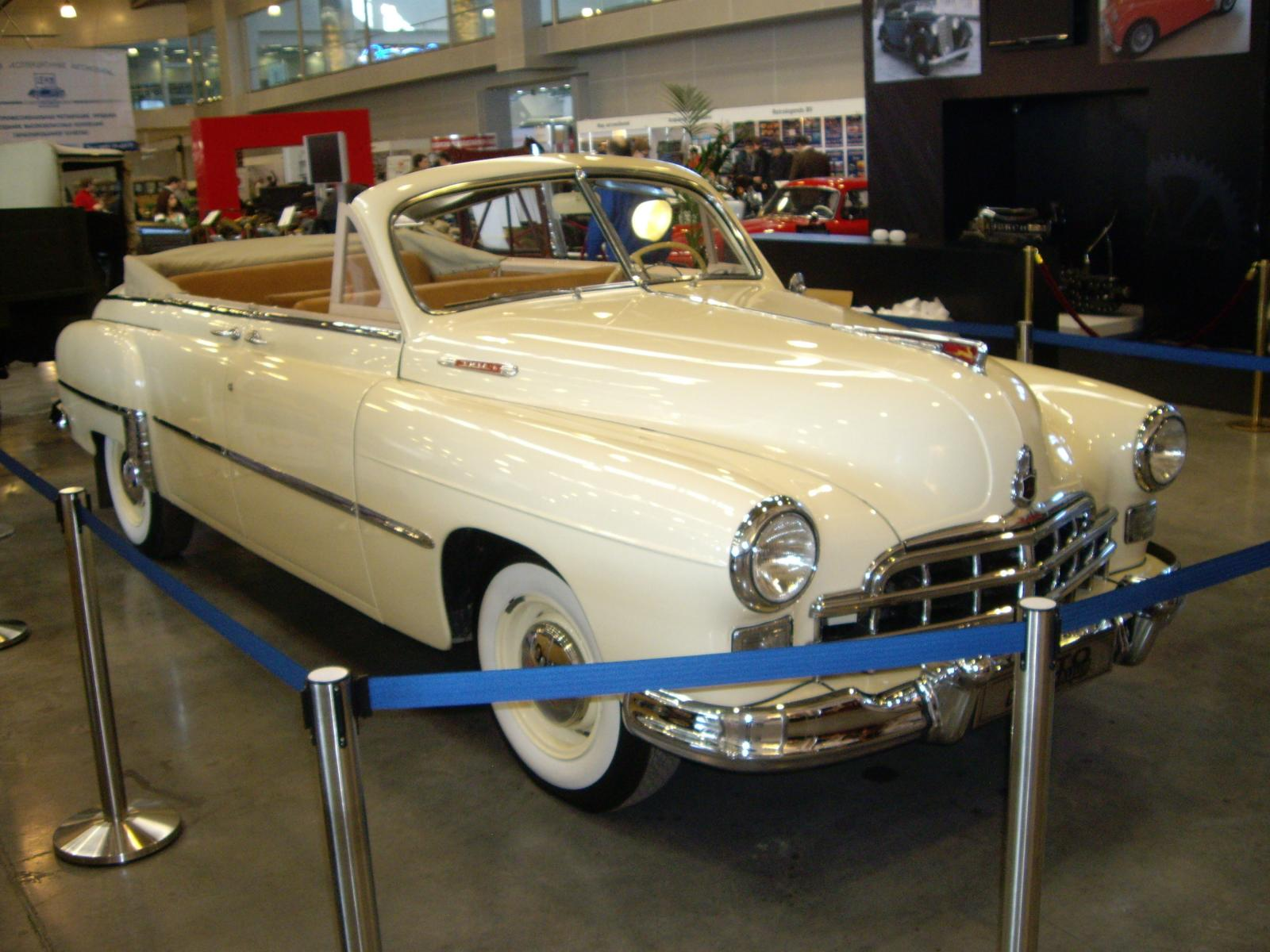
ZIM-12 convertible

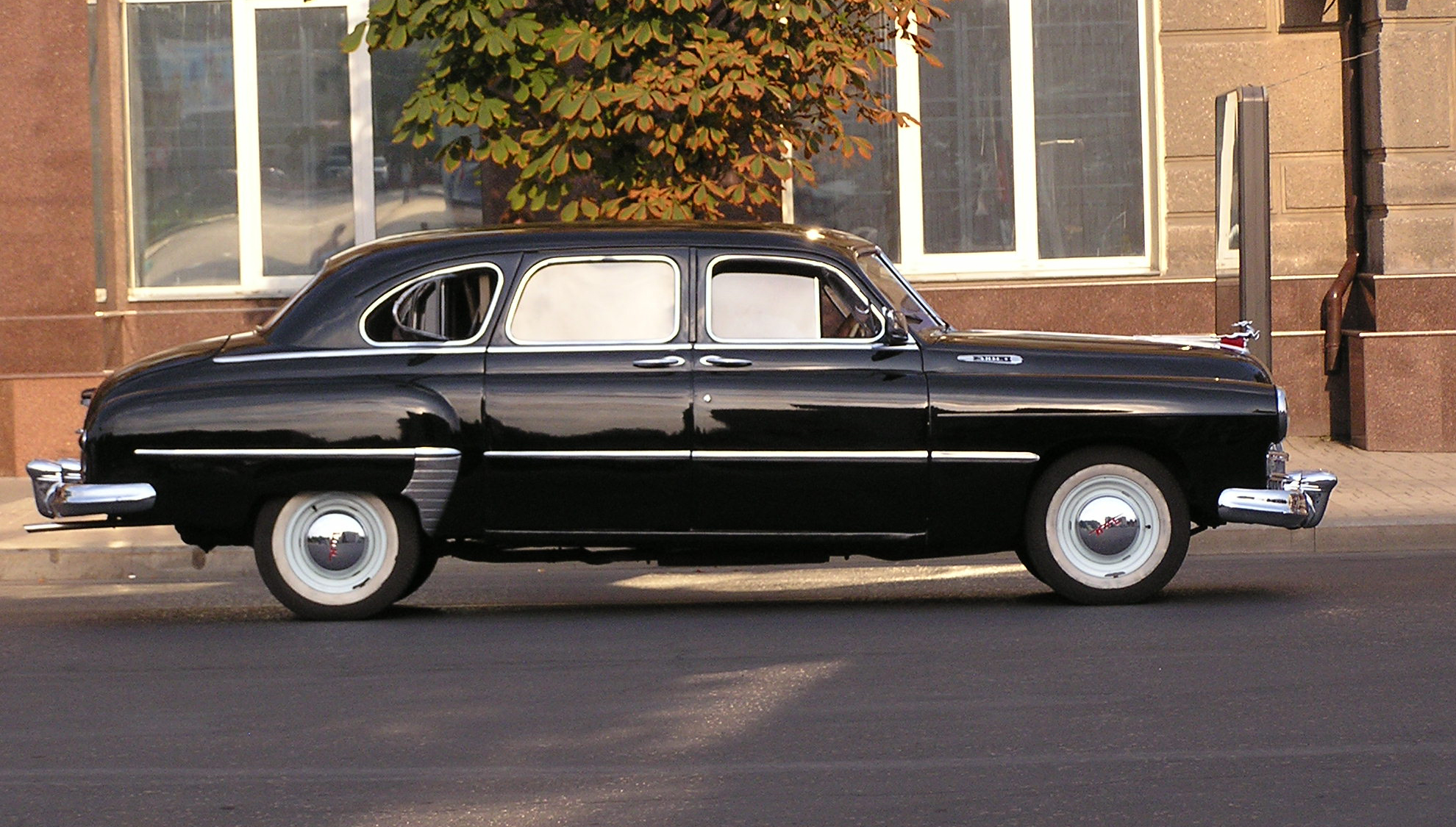
A ZIM-12 in Donetsk

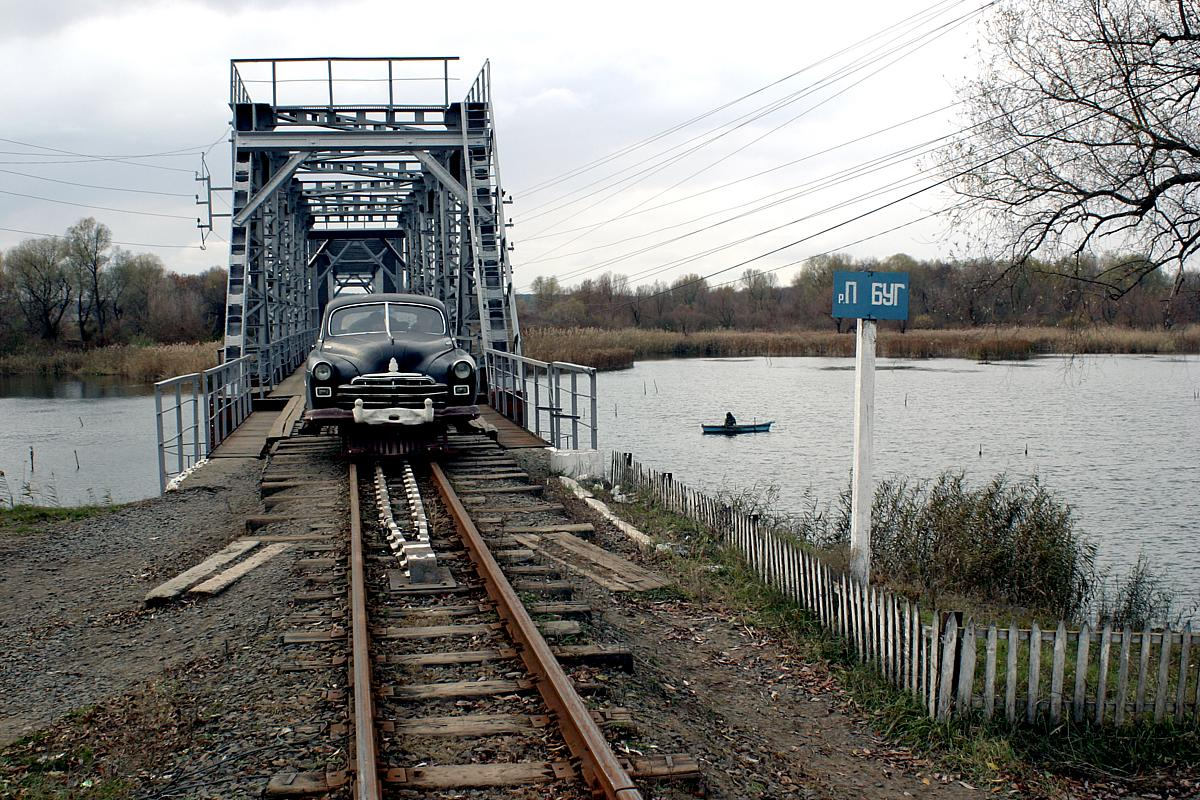
ZIM draisine on the bridge over Southern Bug on Haivoron narrow gauge railway

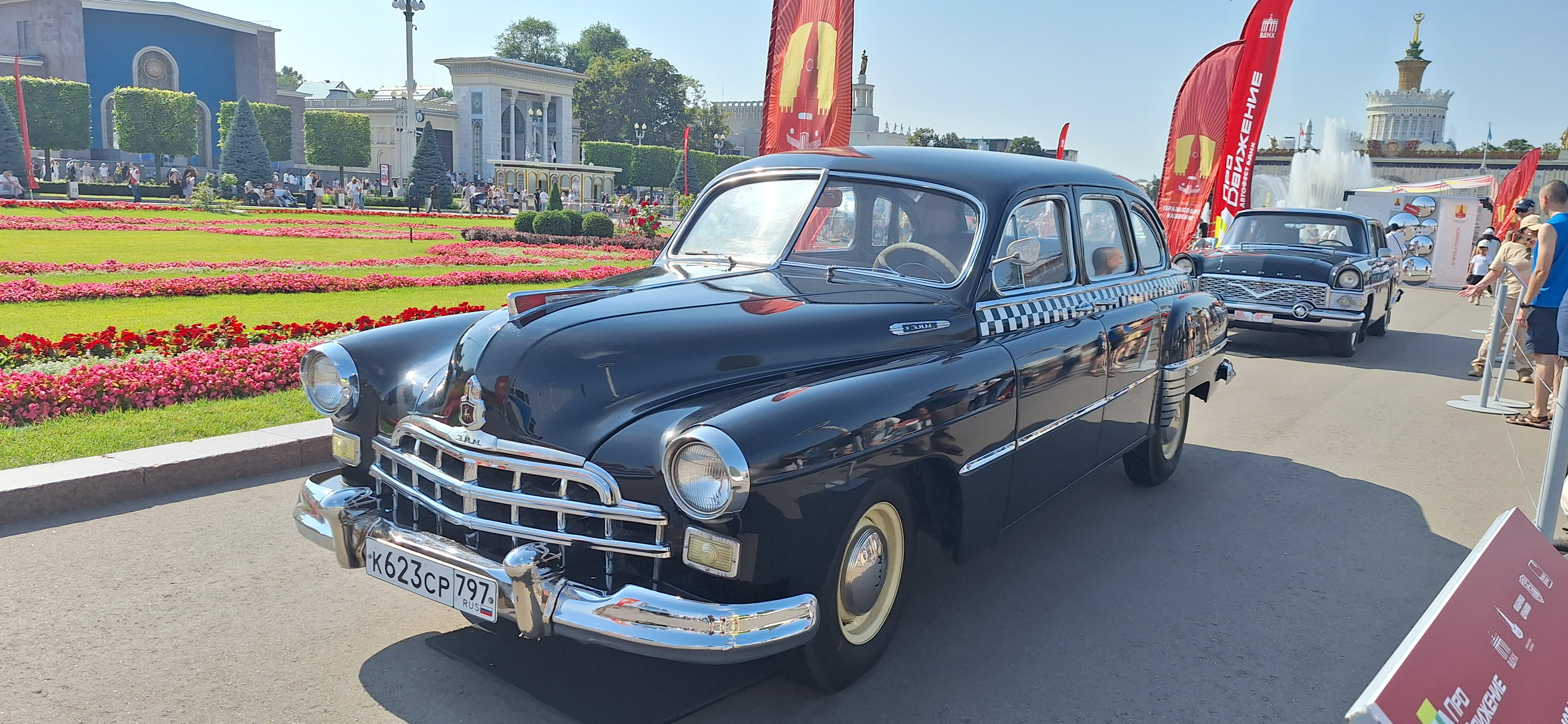
ProDvizhenie excibition.

GAZ began the design process for what became the M12 in May 1948, when the Soviet government requested a six-passenger sedan for the niche between the ZIS-110 and the Pobeda, with a deadline of twenty-nine months to produce it. Due to the lack of time, head designer Andrei Lipgart was given a choice between copying an American product (a Buick) or developing an entirely new model. He chose the latter, despite high level support for simply badge engineering a Buick, although the styling on the production vehicle still resembles a 1948 Buick Super.

The M12 used a lengthened Pobeda monocoque chassis (with a 3,200 mm (130 in) wheelbase), and about half the drivetrain components of the GAZ-51 and GAZ-63 trucks, including an improved version of the 3,485 cc (212.7 cu in) inline-six engine (producing 95 PS [70 kW], rather than the 70 PS [51 kW] in the truck), and the transmission. The ZIM's compression ratio was increased to 6.7:1, but it was still able to employ the 70 octane petrol (gasoline) common in the Soviet Union; this, plus an improved intake manifold and twin-choke (two-barrel) carburetor, was responsible for the increased power. The front suspension was by coil springs, with leaf springs at the rear, and hydraulic shock absorbers. It had drum brakes at all four corners. Despite lacking power steering, the 18.2:1 ratio steering box made turning fairly easy. It offered a standard three-band AM radio, at a time when radios were not standard on most American cars, even the most expensive ones.

The car weighed 1,940 kg (4,280 lb), was capable of getting 19 L/100 km (12 mpg_{‑US}; 15 mpg_{‑imp}), of reaching 126 km/h (78 mph), and of accelerating 0–60 mph (0–97 km/h) in 37 seconds. It had one unusual feature: the rear tread (track), at 1,560 mm (61 in), was wider than the front by 100 mm (3.9 in), to ensure the rear seat would accommodate three passengers. The result was an Oldsmobile-like "bulge". It was also the first GAZ to feature the leaping gazelle hood ornament.

The first car was built in October 1950, and was notionally available to average citizens; its 40,000 ruble price made purchase unlikely (comparing to 16,000 for mid-class Pobeda).

The ZIM abbreviation stands for Zavod imeni Molotova (Russian: Завод имени Молотова). Prior to 1957, the GAZ factory was officially named Gorkovsky avtomobilny zavod imeni V.M. Molotova, or the Vyacheslav Molotov Gorky automotive factory, in honour of the Soviet Foreign Minister. All of the models carried the prefix M instead of GAZ. However, for a car of executive class, a new catchy abbreviation was introduced, coinciding with bigger ZIS limousines. In the style of American car fashion that the vehicle was inspired by, the ZIM was used extensively to decorate the car: the hubcaps, the bonnet, the radiator grille, even the horn button on the steering wheel. However, Molotov's career abruptly ended in May 1957, when he lost a political fallout with Nikita Khrushchev. Thereafter, the USSR rapidly renamed cities, streets, ships and factories that had been named after him. ZIM, which was in production, from the summer of 1957 was hurriedly renamed GAZ-12, and all of the badges and adornments replaced by the new abbreviation. Moreover, right up until the perestroika the car was officially named labelled only as the GAZ-12, whilst unofficially it was almost exclusively referred to as the ZIM.

A prototype four-door cabriolet was built in 1949, but not produced, due to problems with rigidity. It was also overweight for the engine. An ambulance GAZ-12B was also built in 1951–1960, with folding seats for medics and basically same body; stretchers were loaded through the trunk. There was also a taxi variant GAZ-12A, used mainly as a marshrutka in state-owned inter-city communication, and a draisine designed and built on the ZIM basis for the use on narrow-gauge railways.

Due to the high price, the ZIM was exported only to a limited extent, including some examples to Poland, Czechoslovakia, Finland (as large-capacity taxis or sometimes even for private sale) and the GDR. In Czechoslovakia, it was intended to replace the Tatras of the pre-war period, but was not particularly popular due to the poorer driving performance and the less than satisfactory build quality in early years. In the Soviet Union, on the other hand, the car was widespread and continued to see many years of use even after the end of production. It was also used by the civil police force, with these vehicles painted dark blue with red side stripes and a red flashing light on the roof. In 1960, production of all three versions of the GAZ-12 ZIM ended after a total of 21,527 units.

The GAZ-12 was replaced by the GAZ-13 Chaika.

== Technical specifications ==
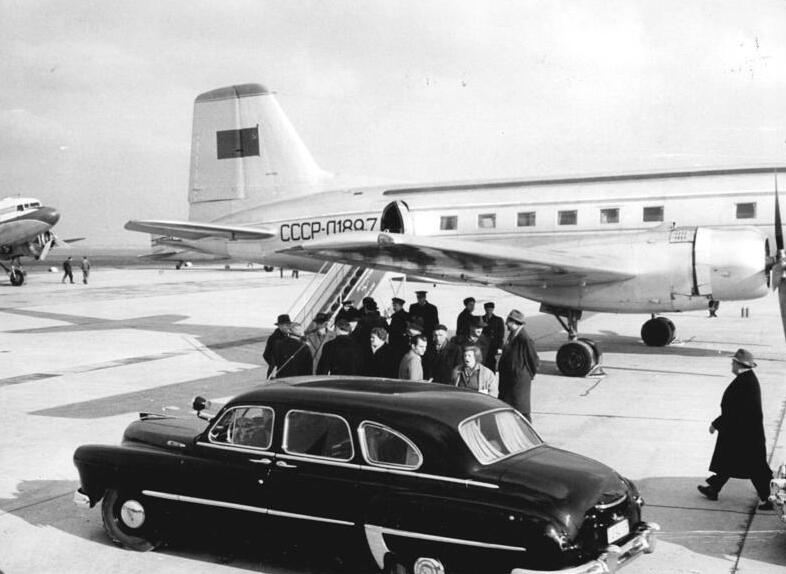
A ZIM-12 of the Soviet delegation in East Germany, 1957

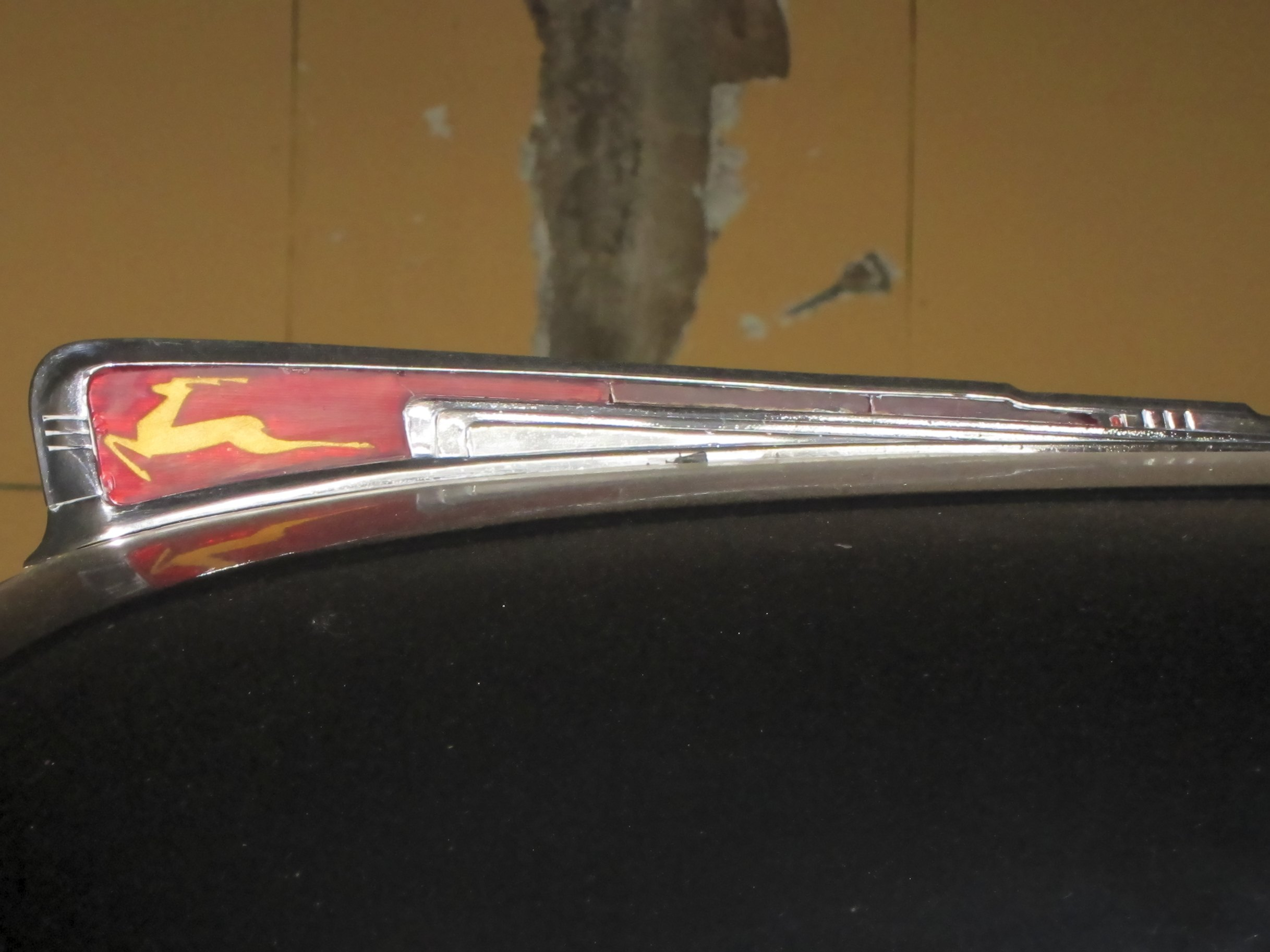
The leaping gazelle

- Clearance: 200 mm (7.9 in)
- Turn radius: 7.4 m (24.28 ft)
- Gearbox: 3 speeds + reverse
- Weight: 1,800 kg (3,968 lb) (1,940 kg (4,277 lb) with full tank, oil and other liquids)
- Maximum speed: 120 km/h (75 mph)
- Fuel tank: 80 L (21 US gal; 18 imp gal)
- Fuel consumption: 15.5 L/100 km (18.2 mpg_{‑imp}; 15.2 mpg_{‑US}) at 50–60 km/h

== Sources ==
- Thompson, Andy (2008), Cars of the Soviet Union: The Definite History, Sparkford, Yeovil, Somerset: Haynes, ISBN 978-1-84425-483-5
- ZIM-12, "Avtolegendy SSSR" Nr.3, DeAgostini, 2009, ISSN 2071-095X (in Russian)
