= GAZ-M1 =

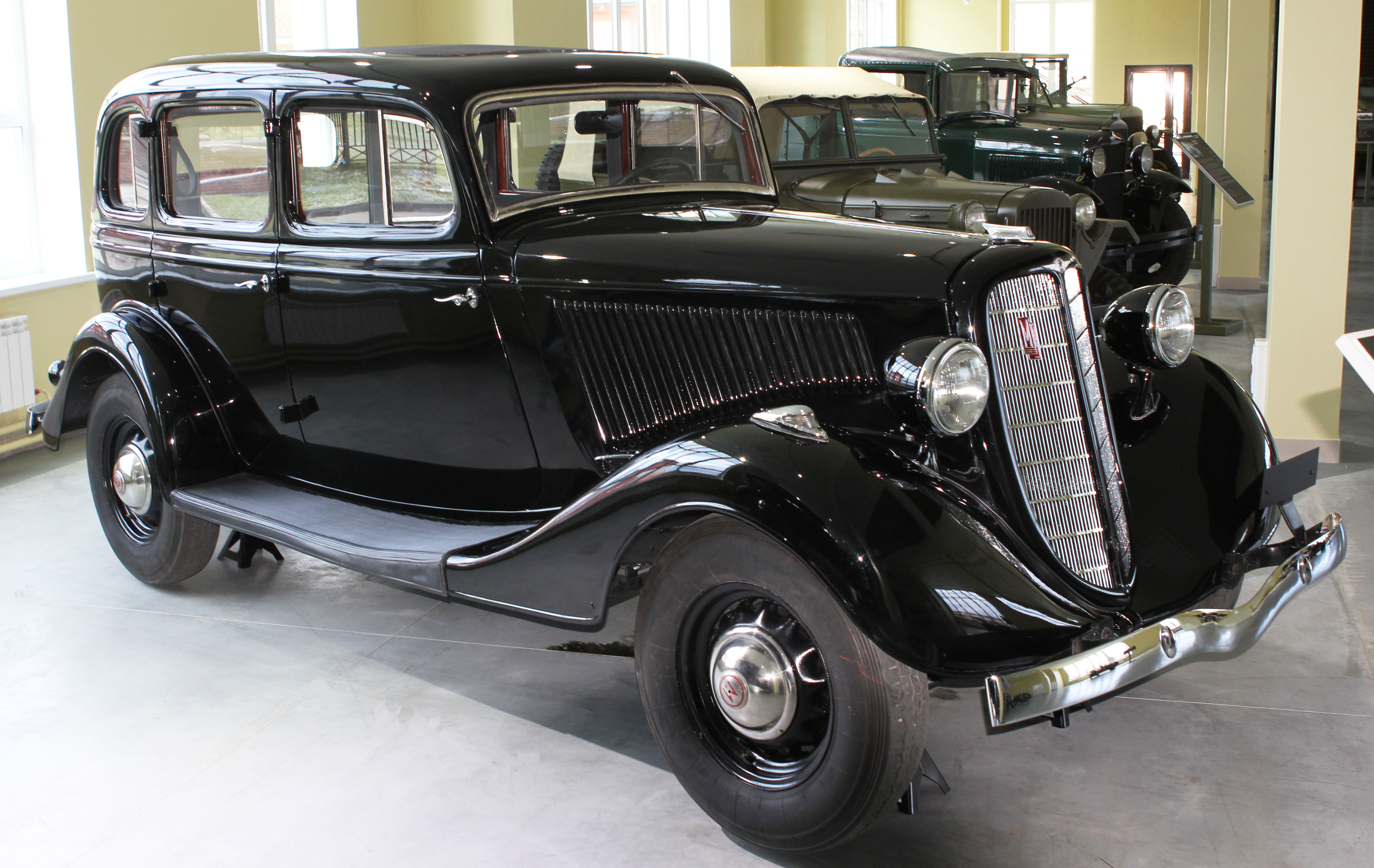

Overview
- Manufacturer: GAZ
- Production: 1936–1943; 1940–1948 (GAZ 11-73)
- Assembly: Soviet Union: Gorky

Body and chassis
- Class: Passenger car
- Layout: Front-engine, rear-wheel-drive
- Related: 1932 Ford

Powertrain
- Engine: 3.3 L (201 ci) GAZ-M (Ford L-head-4) I4 (1936–1940); 3.5 L (218 ci) GAZ-11 (Chrysler flathead) I6 (1940–1948)
- Transmission: 3-speed manual

Dimensions
- Wheelbase: 2,845 mm (112.0 in)
- Length: 4,625 mm (182.1 in)
- Width: 1,770 mm (69.7 in)
- Height: 1,780 mm (70.1 in)
- Kerb weight: 1,370–1,450 kg (3,020–3,197 lb)

Chronology
- Predecessor: GAZ-A (1932–1936)
- Successor: GAZ-M20 Pobeda (4-cylinder); GAZ-12 ZIM (6-cylinder)

The GAZ M1 (“Эмка“/”Emka”) was a passenger car produced by the Soviet automaker GAZ between 1936 and 1943, at their plant in Gorky (now Nizhny Novgorod, Russia).

Systematic production ended in 1941, but the factory was able to continue assembling cars from existing inventory of parts and components until 1943. In total, 62,888 GAZ M1 automobiles were produced.

Much of the car's production period coincided with the Great Patriotic War (World War II), and many Emkas, as they were commonly called, were used by the army as staff cars. Various special versions were produced such as the GAZ M - FAI and BA-20 armoured car models.

The car has subsequently become an icon of its time in Russia, having been relatively popular, and featuring in film and photographic images of a defining period in the history of the Soviet Union.

== Background ==
The Soviet Union's first passenger car had been the GAZ-A, produced between 1932 and 1936, and based on the Ford Model A (1927–31), built under license/technology sharing agreement with and using parts purchased from the American Ford Motor Company. It was many years before passenger cars became available for private buyers in the Soviet Union, and passenger cars at that time were produced for official and military use. By the time the GAZ-A was produced in the Soviet Union, the western original Ford Model A was already being superseded in its western markets, and the politicians and Red army looked for a way to reduce dependence on imported components and replacement parts. The version of the Ford adapted for Soviet production was an open-topped car which was unsuitable for the winter climate encountered in most of the country, and the cars were also felt to be unreliable and insufficiently robust for the relatively harsh Russian conditions.

There had been various attempts to modify the GAZ-A using locally designed elements, but the body structures used traditional timber frames with panels attached, which were labour-intensive to produce and excessively prone to deform. In the US, car body construction was changing radically during the later 1920s, using technology pioneered by Budd Company, for the production of all-steel car bodies. The new approach used far more complicated steel pressings than had hitherto been possible, and the new techniques were adopted by the more prosperous of the volume auto-makers in the west of Europe through the 1930s. GAZ's western technology partner, Ford, took a conservative approach to those developments, but during the early 1930s it also joined the switch to all-steel car bodies.

The Soviet Union was keen for the same technology to be applied at the GAZ plant in Gorky (now Nizhny Novgorod), exploiting the ten-year technology-sharing agreement which had been signed with the Ford Motor Company in 1932 and which, at that stage, remained more or less intact.

== Development and introduction ==
Work began in 1933/34 on a replacement for the GAZ-A, again using a (newer) Ford model as the basis. The model in question was the Ford Model B, which was becoming available with a wide range of different bodies in North America.

Specifically, the first prototype for the GAZ M-1 was based on the 1934 Ford Model B 40A four-door sedan. The prototype was powered by a four-cylinder engine (a modified version of the one used in its predecessor the GAZ-A), although it appears already to have been intended that production cars, like the Ford on which they were based, would use V8 units. Documentation was transferred by Ford in accordance with the terms of the technology sharing agreement and the first prototype was unveiled in February 1935. A major innovation for the manufacturer was the all-steel body, although at this stage the roof was still reinforced using timber side rails and was coated with synthetic “leatherette” fabric.

In 1936 the M-1 replaced the GAZ-A on the manufacturer's production lines, with the first two cars produced in March of that year and volume production starting in May. By the end of 1936 the plant had produced 2,524 GAZ M-1s, and in 1937 an M-1 was displayed in Paris at the International Artistic and technical exhibition of modern life. The letter ”M” was included in the car's name as the plant's name included that of Vyacheslav Molotov.

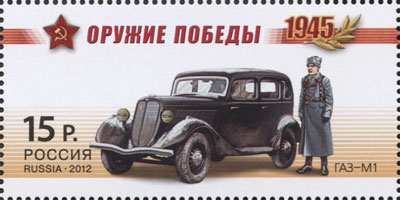
This 15 rouble "special issue" postage stamp of 2012 reflects the car's enduring iconic status in Russia.

== Local modifications ==
The development of the M-1 involved many changes to the Ford on which it was based, so that many came to view the Russian car as a separate model. The rather primitive Ford suspension was completely redesigned to cope with local conditions, and matched to strong steel wheels. The GAZ-M1 did not use the Ford V8 as used in the American counterpart but an improved variant of its predecessor engine, this was likely because Ford had only sent drawings of the V8 to GAZ and not the actual tooling. The GAZ development team had not had access to the actual Ford engine as fitted in Detroit, and so they had to make do with what they already had available and improvise. The GAZ engineers also redesigned the front wings which left the Russian car with a more elegant shape which provided better protection from the elements for the front suspension.

=== The body ===
The M-1 represented a huge advance over its predecessor in many respects. Most obviously, it came with a body that used the “all-steel” approach of the more modern western designs (despite retaining timber structural elements in the roof frame) and, unlike its predecessor, a permanent fixed roof. The chassis featured an X-shaped cross member making it far stronger. The suspension was more modern and the road holding more sure-footed. Under the bonnet/hood the car came with automatic ignition, while the cabin featured front seats that could be adjusted, sun-visors, along with an electric fuel gauge, and windows which could be swiveled into an open position.

=== The engine and transmission ===
The engine was more powerful and more durable. Maximum output rose from 40 PS (29 kW; 39 hp) to 50 PS (37 kW; 49 hp), supported by a compression ratio increased to 4.6:1 and a new carburetor design. The new engine came with a fuel pump whereas its predecessor had depended on a gravity driven fuel-feed system.

The same engine was subsequently installed in the GAZ-MM light truck, an upgrade of the GAZ-AA.

The three speed manual transmission now featured synchromesh in the upper two ratios, and was the gear box that would be carried forward to the replacement GAZ-M20 Pobeda in the later 1940s.

== Finish ==
Most of the cars were painted black with a thin red stripe down each side. The seat covers were of thick cloth material coloured grey or brown, while the interior décor was characterised by painted metal, albeit combined with some wood trim.

== Engine upgrade ==
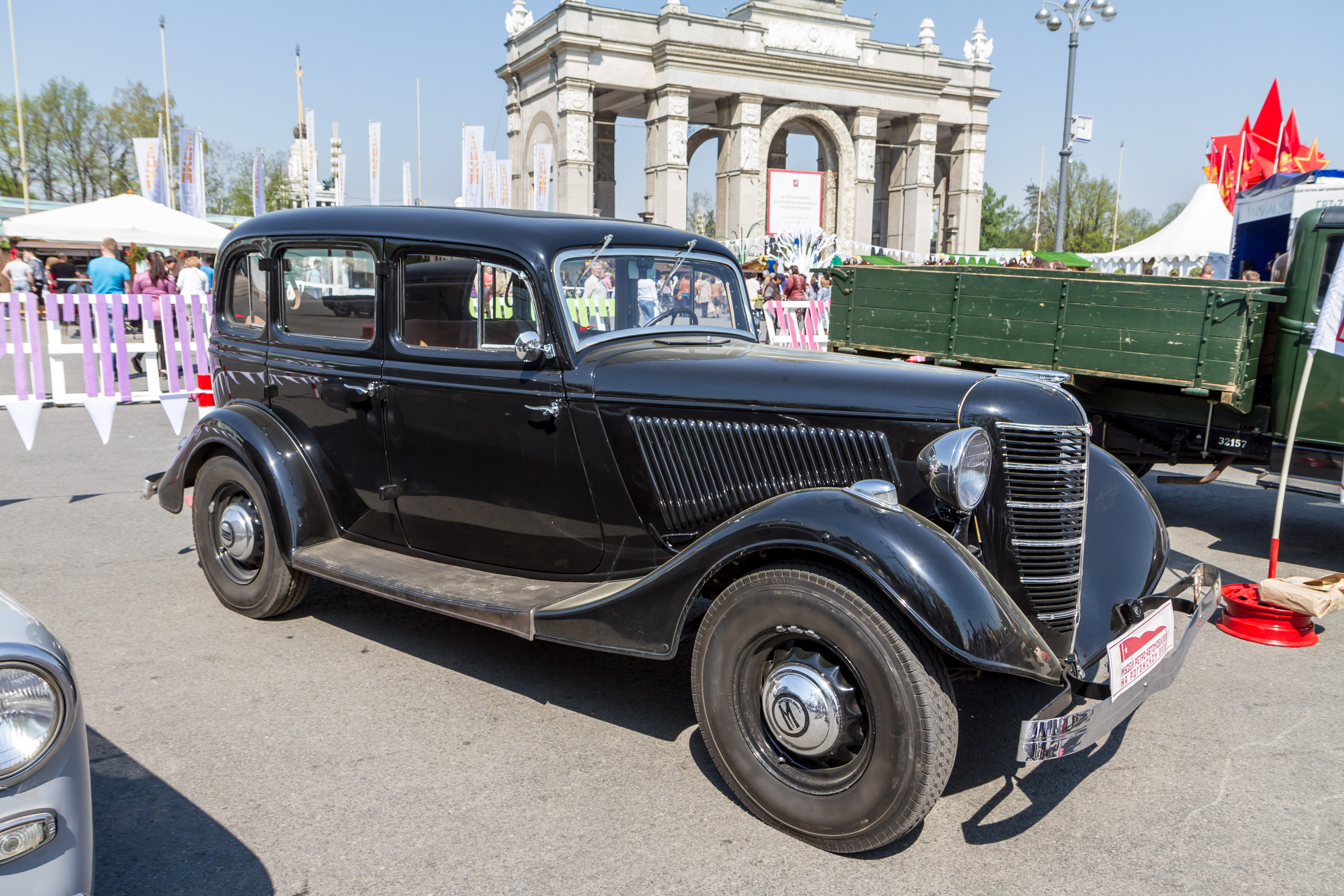
GAZ-11-73 (also referred to as the GAZ M-11)

Towards the end of the 1930s the decision was taken to replace the by now rather dated Ford designed side-valve engine. Again, the manufacturer turned to the US auto-industry, this time to Chrysler. The engine selected was the six-cylinder unit fitted to the Dodge D5, which was considered relatively advanced at the time despite being a development of a unit that had originated back in 1928. The 3485 cc unit produced 76 PS (56 kW; 75 hp), which was far more power than that produced by the Ford designed units that had powered the earlier M-1s. The necessary drawings were purchased in 1937–38, and after all the measurements had been converted to their metric values the necessary tooling was created and volume production of this engine, now designated as the GAZ-11 unit, began in 1940. The same unit was the basis for the GAZ-51 and GAZ-12 ZIM engines, and a four-cylinder variant of it was also used in the GAZ-M20 Pobeda. It also found its way into the all-wheel drive GAZ-61 as well as various military applications such as tanks and gun carriages.

When equipped with the six-cylinder GAZ-11 engine, the car received a new radiator shroud and longer bonnet, and was designated GAZ-11-73, sometimes referred to as the GAZ M-11. Production of this variant ended in 1948 when production of its successor, the GAZ-M20 Pobeda, was completely mastered. After the production of GAZ 11-73 was finished, its role was taken up by the GAZ-M20 Pobeda, which however had a four-cylinder engine. Instead, the six-cylinder engine would be used on the larger and more luxurious GAZ-12 ZIM from 1950.

== Taxi use ==
Plans to develop a dedicated taxi version of the M-1 were never fully realised, but there was nevertheless a demand for taxis in some cities which the M-1 fulfilled. The first 20 cars produced were introduced as taxis in Leningrad in 1936, and by the late summer of 1939 there were 20 of the cars being used for taxi work in Minsk. By that date there were 465 registered for taxi work in Leningrad and a further 2,740 in Moscow.

== Variants ==
=== Four-cylinder version ===
- GAZ-M1: Main production version. Produced 1935–1941, although assembly of available stock continued into 1942.
- GAZ-M1 phaeton: Prototype phaeton-bodied (four-door convertible) version of the GAZ-M1. Produced in 1937.
- GAZ-M45: LPG-fueled version of the GAZ-M1. Produced in 1941.

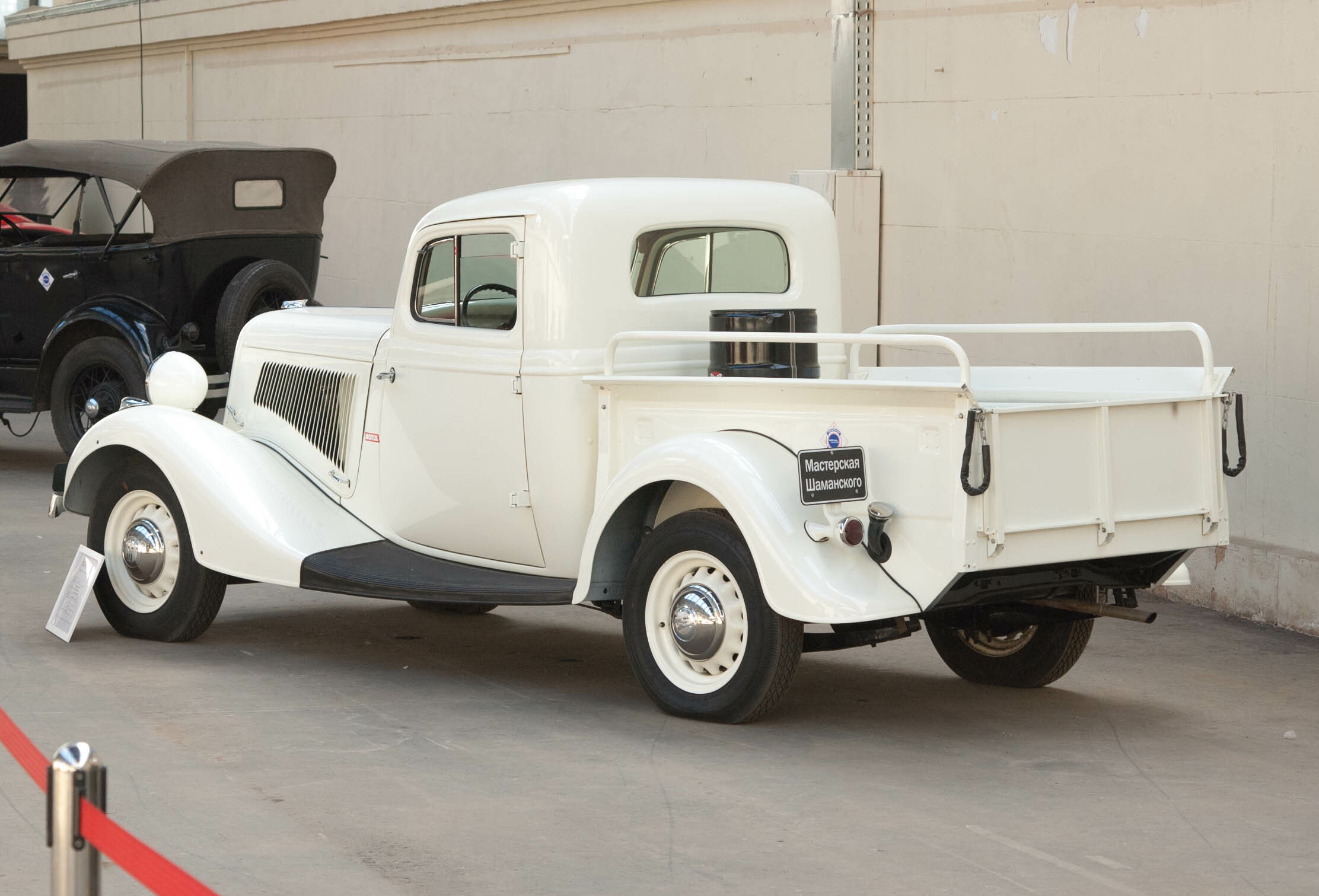
Rear view of the GAZ-M415, a light truck version of the M1

- GAZ-M415: Pickup truck version. Produced 1939–1941.
- GAZ-MS: GAZ-M1 chassis for mounting armored bodies.

=== Six-cylinder version ===
- GAZ-11-73 (GAZ-11): Passenger car version. Produced 1940-1941 and 1945–1948.
- GAZ-11-40: Prototype four-door convertible version. Produced in 1940; all later rebuilt to GAZ-61-40.
- GAZ-11-415: Prototype pickup-truck version. Produced in 1940.

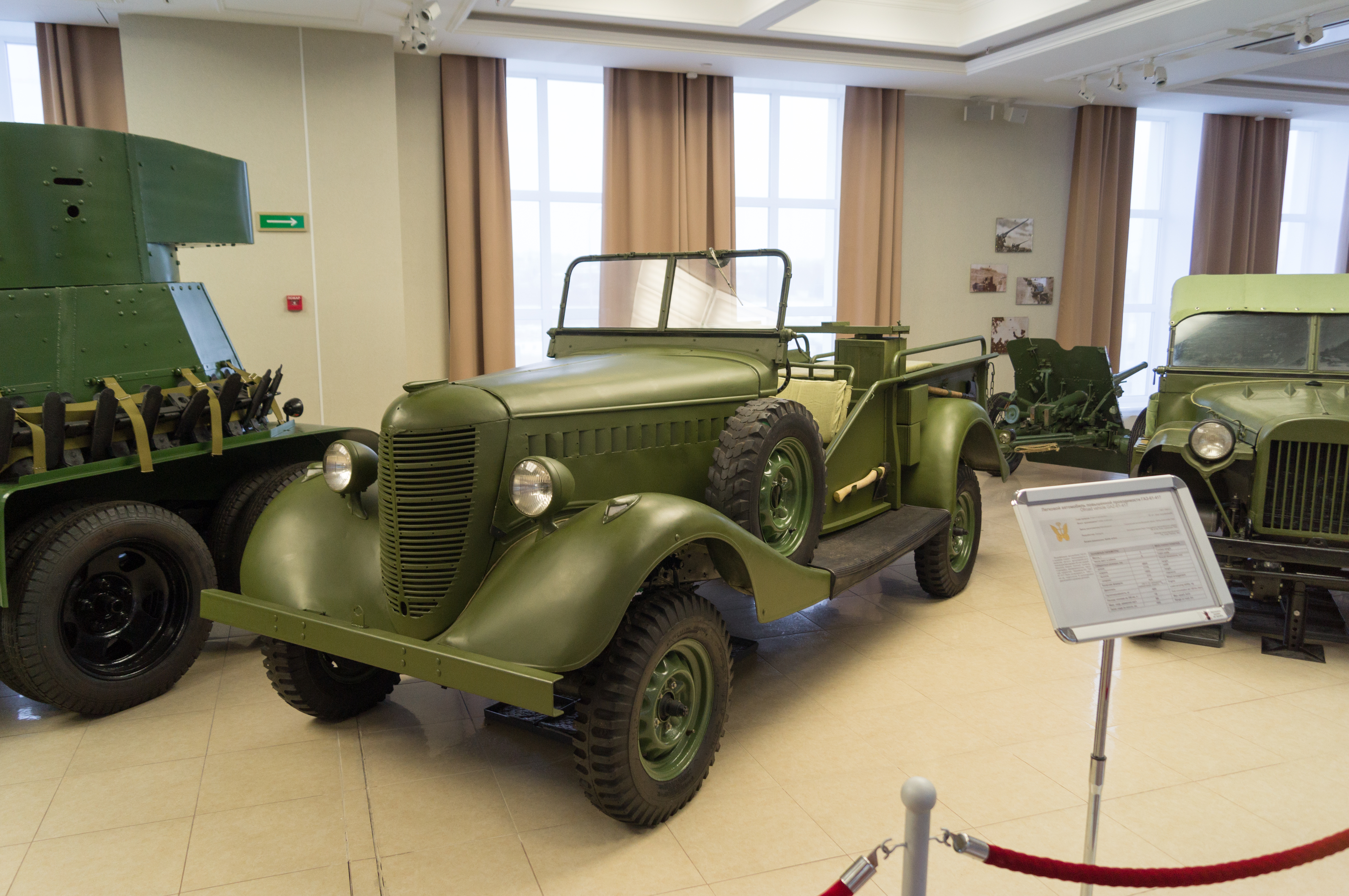
GAZ-41-416

- GAZ-41-416: Light artillery tractor version.
- GAZ-61-73: 4x4 version. Produced 1941–1945
- GAZ-61-415: Prototype pickup-truck version of GAZ-61-73. Produced in 1940.

=== Three-axle prototypes ===
- GAZ-M21: Prototype 6x4 truck version with GAZ-AA cab. Produced in 1936; rejected as too complex and replaced by the GAZ-61.
- GAZ-M22:
- GAZ-M23:
- GAZ-M24:
- GAZ-M25: Prototype 7-seater car based on GAZ-M21. Produced in 1938.

=== Other variants ===
- BA-20: Light armored car on GAZ-M1 chassis.
- GAZ-M1 V8: Variant for NKVD with imported 65 hp Ford V8s. Most of the engines were removed in 1941 and were installed in T-60 tanks.
- GAZ-M2

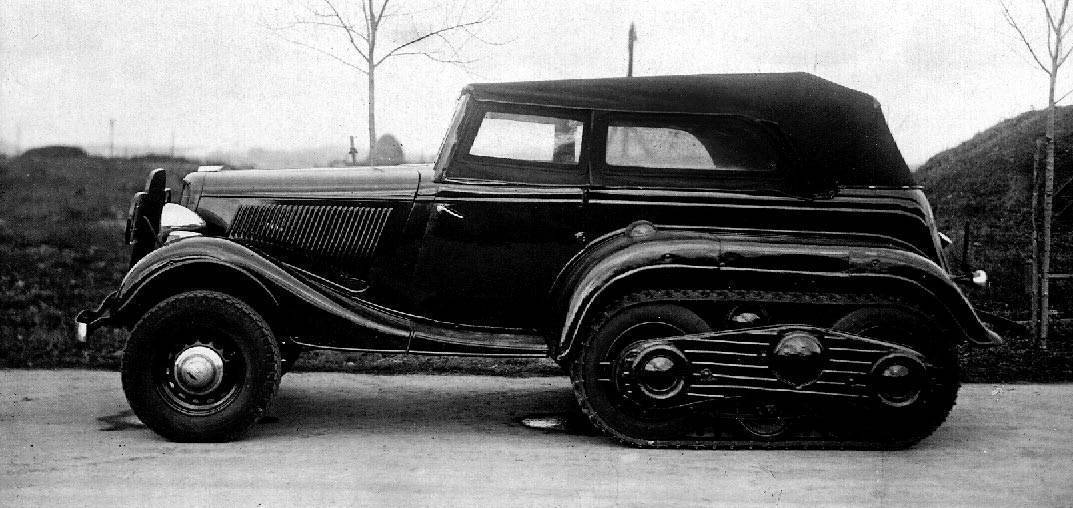
GAZ-VM phaeton

- GAZ-NATI-VM: Prototype halftrack with sedan and truck bodies. Produced 1937–1938.

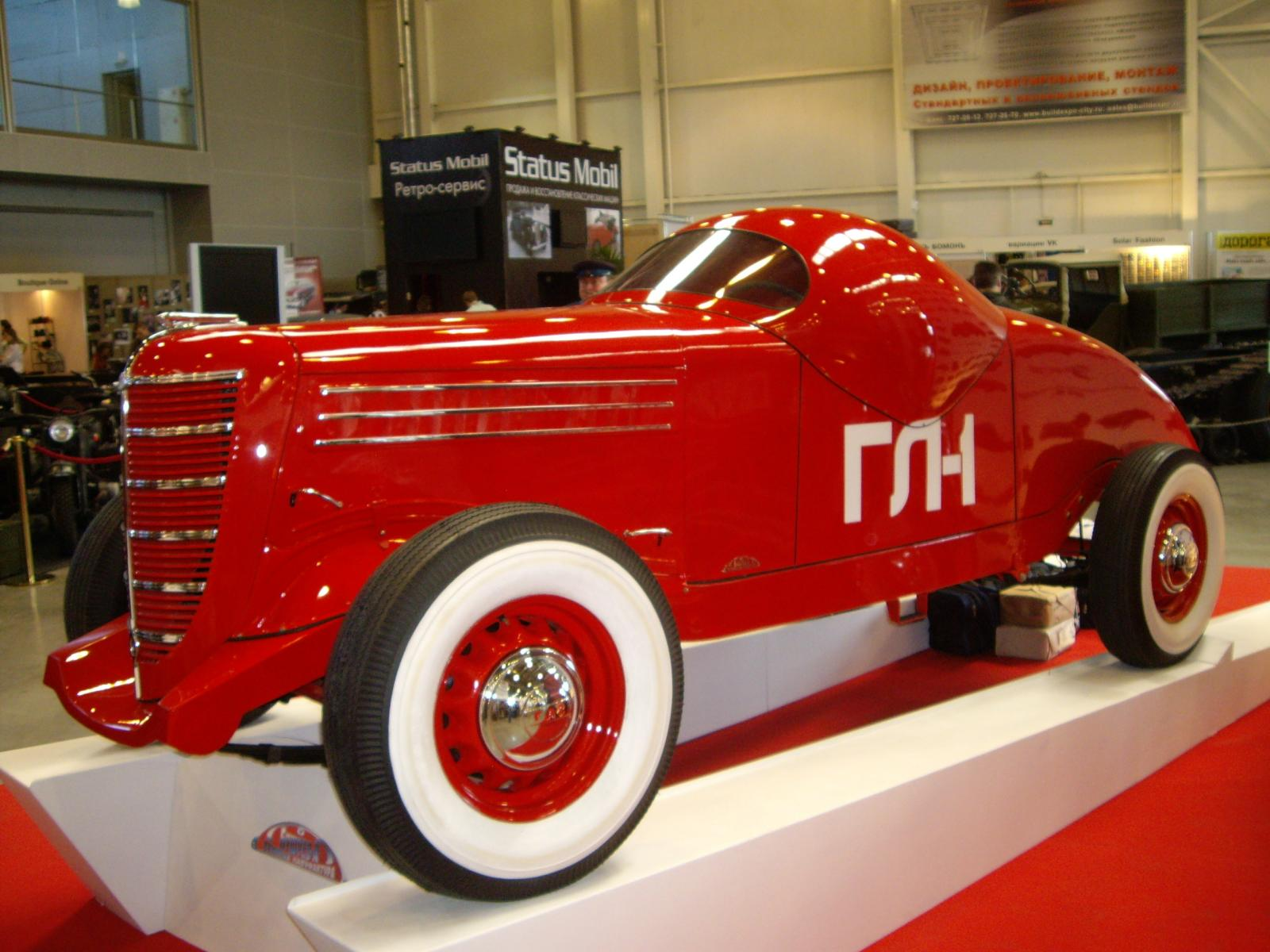
GAZ-GL1

- GAZ-GL1: racing car version based on the M1. During the later years, it was modified with GAZ 11-73 parts, including a new grille and engine. Only 1-2 prototypes were built. All of them were destroyed in the bombing of the factory during the Great Patriotic War. In 2006 a Russian company started building a replica of the GL1 using both old surviving drawings from the GAZ plant and some parts from an unrestored GAZ-M1. The body was newly made from fiberglass. In 2010 the replica was completed.

In addition to these variants, a special model of the GAZ-M1 had been developed in 1938 for the NKVD agents. It was powered by a high-performance version of the Ford V8 engine, which was directly imported from the U.S. rather than built locally. During the war, most of these engines were removed from M1s and put into T-60 tanks for the war effort.
