= GAZ-M20 Pobeda =

GAZ-M20 'Pobeda'
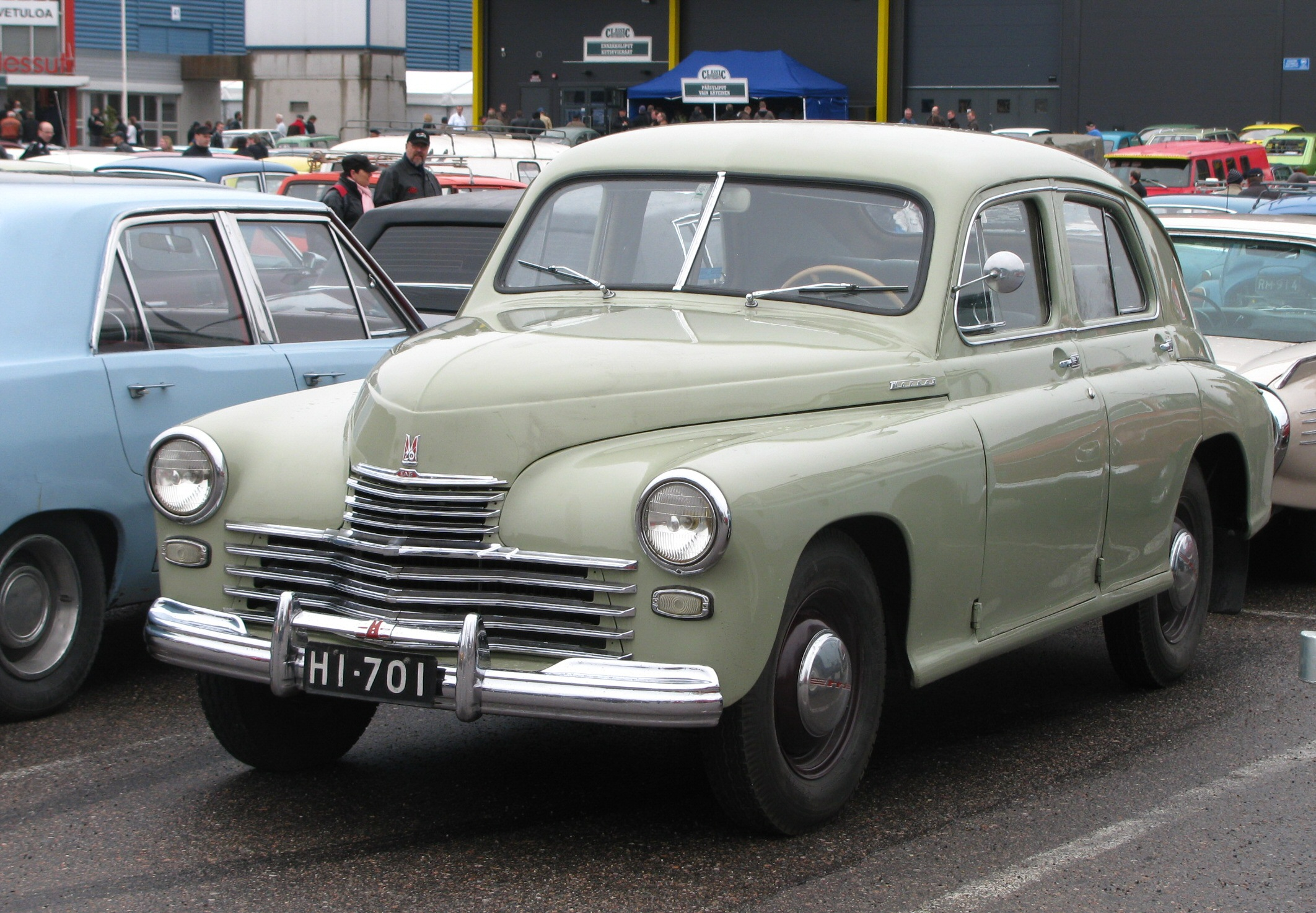

Overview
- Manufacturer: GAZ
- Production: June 1946 – 1958
- Assembly: Soviet Union: Gorky

Body and chassis
- Class: Executive car (E)
- Body style: 4-door sedan fastback/cabriolet
- Layout: FR layout; F4 layout (GAZ-M72)
- Related: FSO Warszawa; GAZ-M72 (4WD, model with Pobeda body)

Powertrain
- Engine: 2.1 L M-20 sv I4
- Transmission: 3-speed manual

Dimensions
- Wheelbase: 2,700 mm (106.3 in)
- Length: 4,665 mm (183.7 in)
- Width: 1,695 mm (66.7 in)
- Height: 1,590 mm (62.6 in)
- Curb weight: 1,350 kg (2,980 lb); 1,690 kg (3,730 lb) (GAZ-M72)

Chronology
- Predecessor: GAZ 11-73
- Successor: GAZ-21 Volga

The GAZ-M20 "Pobeda" (Russian: ГАЗ-М20 Победа, lit. 'Victory') is a passenger car produced in the Soviet Union by GAZ from 1946 until 1958. It was also licensed to the Polish Passenger Automobile Factory and produced there as the FSO Warszawa. Although usually known as the GAZ-M20, an original car's designation at that time was just M-20: M for "Molotovets" (the GAZ factory was named after Vyacheslav Molotov).

== History ==
The first sketches of similar-looking cars were completed by Valentin Brodsky in 1938 and by Vladimir Aryamov in 1940, which revealed a growing tendency towards streamlined car design in the Soviet Union. Aryamov's two-door coupe GAZ-11-80, designed in 1940, greatly resembled the later Pobeda and was in many ways identical to it. However, after the German invasion of 1941 military priorities delayed the work on the new car and the factory was switched to military production. The first Pobeda was developed in the Soviet Union under chief engineer Andrei A. Liphart. Originally intended to be called "Rodina" (Homeland), the name "Pobeda" (Victory) was a back-up, but was preferred by Joseph Stalin. "How much does the homeland cost?" - he asked. The name was also chosen because the works started in 1943 at Gorky Avto Zavod (GAZ, "Gorky Car Plant"), when victory in World War II began to seem likely, and the car was to be a model for post-war times. The plant was later heavily bombarded, but work was unaffected. Styling was done by "the imaginative and talented Veniamin Samoilov".

The GAZ-M20 Pobeda was one of the first Soviet cars of original design and moreover at the front line of a new vogue in automobile design; only the front suspension and, partly, the unitized body were influenced by the 1938 Opel Kapitän and the 1941 Chevrolet Fleetline (the choice of car may have been influenced by the acquisition of the tooling from Opel's Rüsselsheim factory as part of the war reparations package for the Soviet side, which also led to the creation of the Moskvitch 400/420). It was one of the first cars to feature ponton styling with slab sides, although it did not enter full production until 1949. The M20 was the first Soviet car using entirely domestic body dies; it was designed against wooden bucks, which suffered warping, requiring last-minute tuning by GAZ factory employees. The first prototype was ready on November 6, 1944 (for an anniversary of the October Revolution). A number of parts such as the gearbox and the transmission for the Pobeda (especially the early models) were carried over from the GAZ-M1 and modernized GAZ 11-73. The first production model rolled off the assembly line on June 21, 1946. It was also the first Soviet automobile to have turn signals, two electric windshield wipers (rather than mechanical- or vacuum-operated ones), four-wheel hydraulic brakes, an electric heater, and a factory-installed AM radio. The car came to be a symbol of postwar Soviet life and is today a popular collector's item.

== Design and development ==
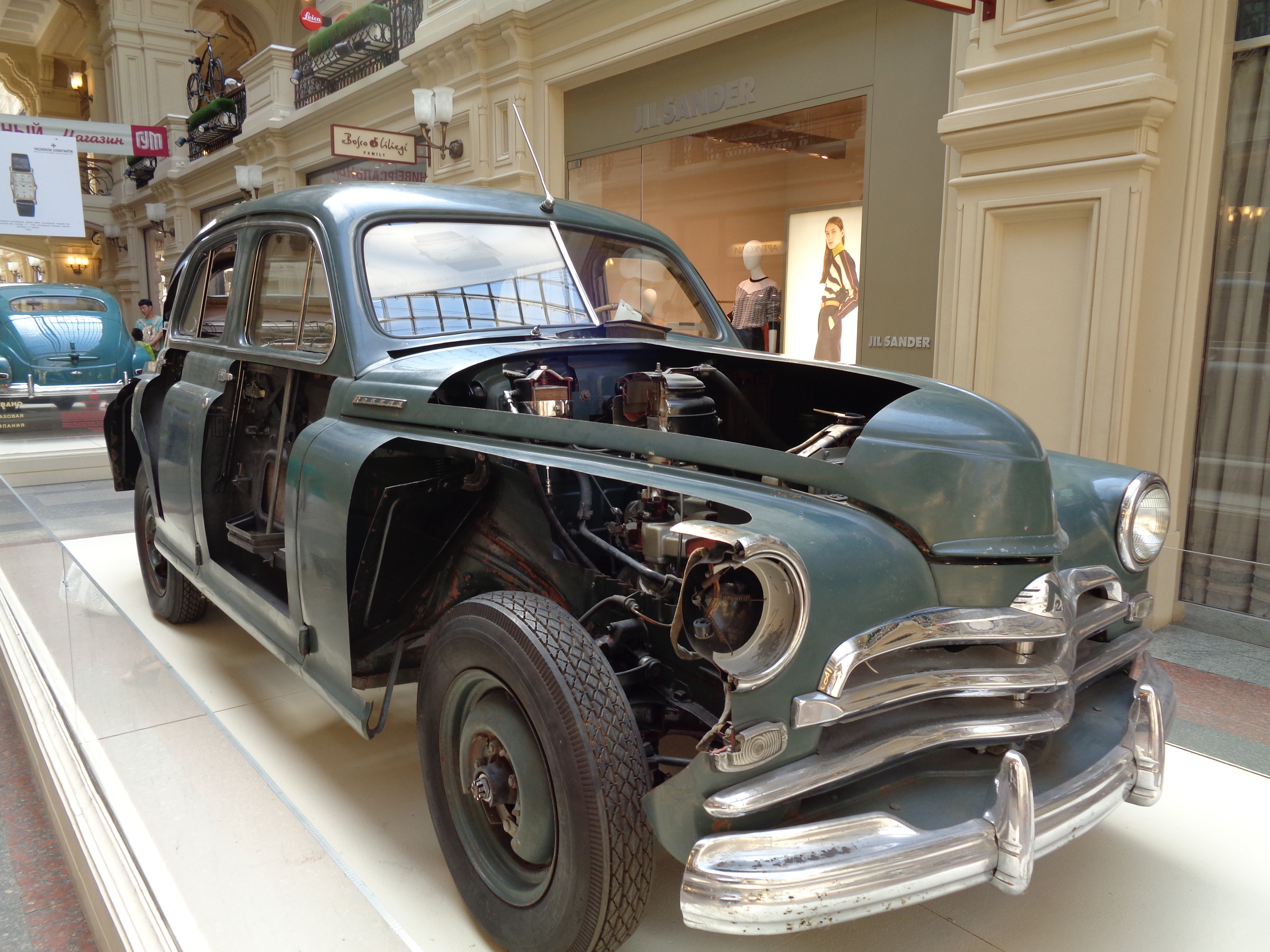
The layout of the car GAZ-M20

During the design process, GAZ had to choose between a 62 PS (46 kW) 2,700 cc (165 cu in) inline six and a 50 PS (37 kW) 2,112 cc (129 cu in) inline four; Stalin preferred the four, so it was used. The same M-20 engine was later used on the ASU-57 light assault gun. In addition, the headlights were covered by an American patent.

Production started in 1946, only a year after the end of the world war, and was difficult due to serious economic and technical hardships caused by the war; by the end of 1946, only twenty-three cars were completed, virtually by hand. Truly mass production had to wait until 28 April 1947, and even then, only 700 were built before October 1948. During that period the Soviet Union was unable to produce steel sheets large enough for body panels, so strips had to be welded together, which led to countless leaks and 20 kg (44 lb) of solder in the body, as well as an increase in weight of 200 kg (440 lb). Steel quality was below average, up to 60% was rejected, and the overall quality of the first cars was so low that production was actually stopped by order of the government and the company's director was fired. On August 31, 1948, the government issued a decree requiring the immediate improvement of quality and thorough testing of the new automobiles. The cars and their integral parts were subjected to detailed laboratory and on-road testing, opinions of the cars' drivers were carefully studied and taken into account.

After a reorganisation, solving the initial build quality issues, making 346 improvements and adding two thousand new tools, the Pobeda was returned to production. It had a new carburetor, different final drive ratio (5.125:1 rather than 4.7:1), strengthened rear springs, improved heater, and the ability to run on the low-grade 66 octane fuel typical in the Soviet Union. (Among the changes was a 5 cm (2.0 in) lower rear seat, enabling military and police officers to ride without removing their caps). The improvements enabled the new Pobeda to reach 50 km/h (31 mph) in 12 seconds, half the previous model's time. In January 1949, the state commission issued a report after testing the new model and its parts, where it noted the significant improvement of build quality, ruggedness and durability of the car, good fuel consumption and on-road performance, especially on poor roads.

The improved Pobeda entered production on 1 November 1949, and the techniques needed to develop and manufacture it effectively created the Soviet automobile industry. In 1952, improved airflow in the engine increased power from 50 PS (37 kW) to 52 PS (38 kW); it climbed to 55 PS (40 kW), along with the new grille, upholstery, steering wheel, radio, and radiator badge, as the M20V (Russian: М-20В), 1955.

=== Versions ===
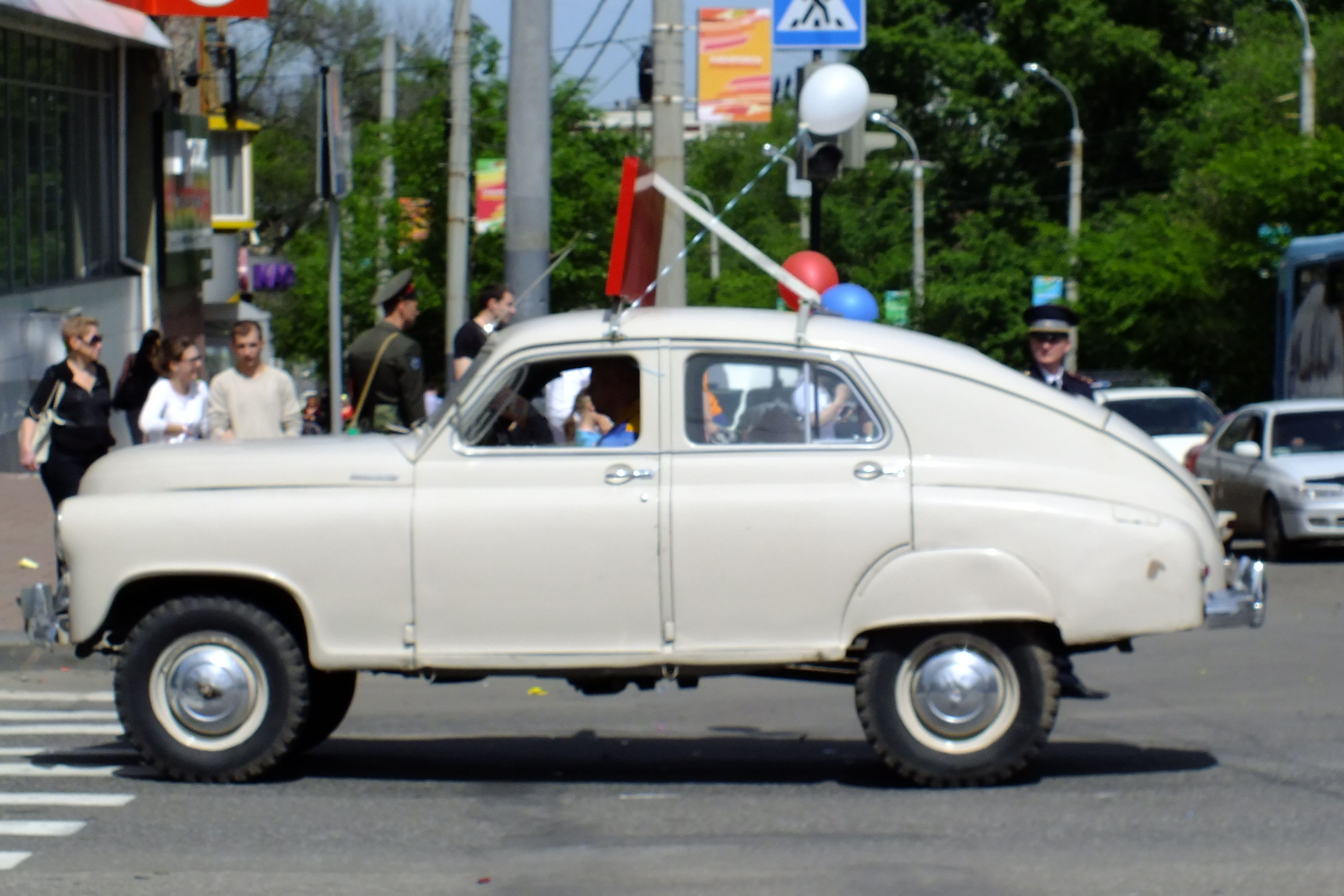
The GAZ M-72 was the world's first series-produced monocoque four-wheel drive (1955).

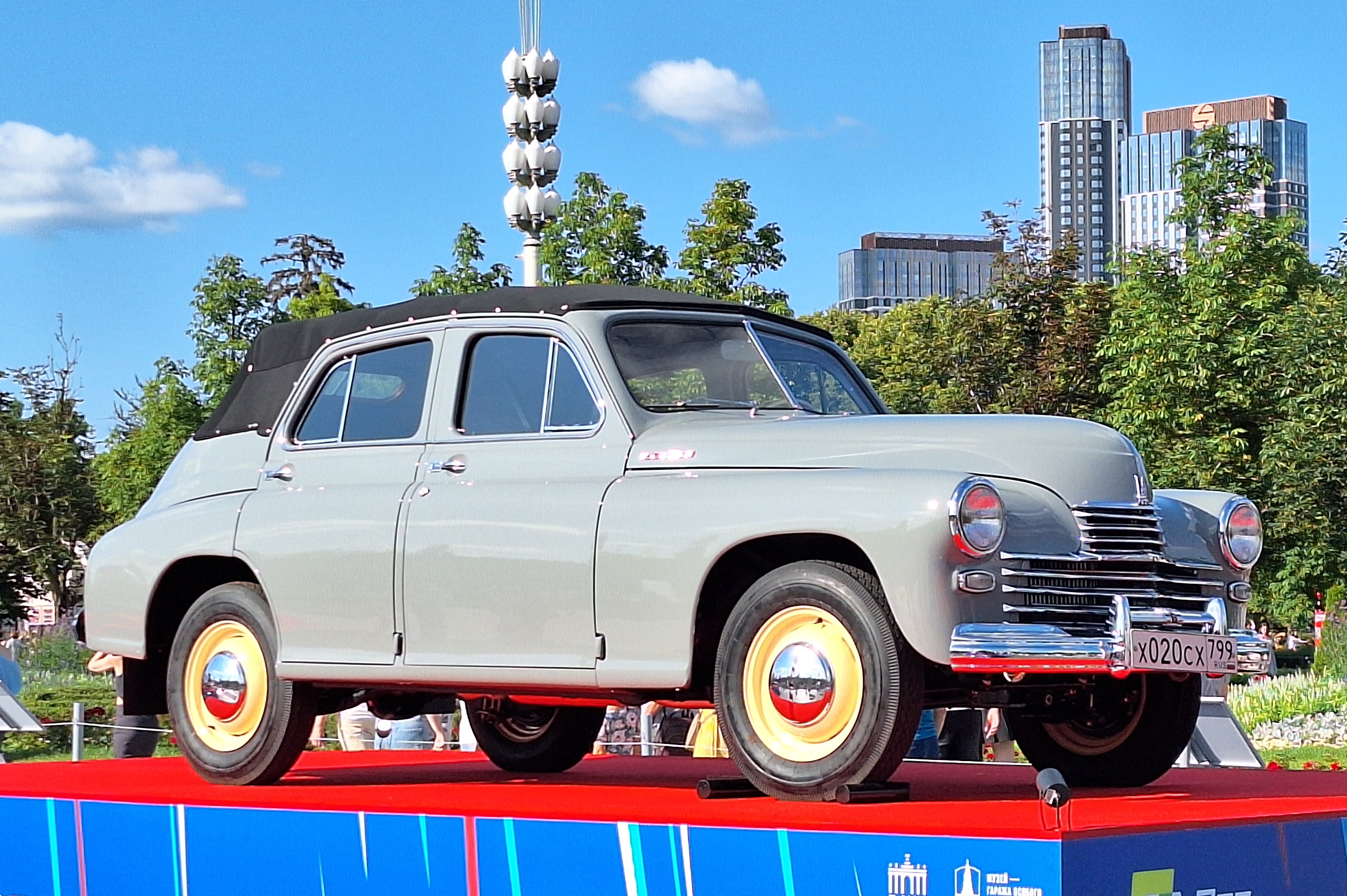
The GAZ-20B-31 (cabriolet).

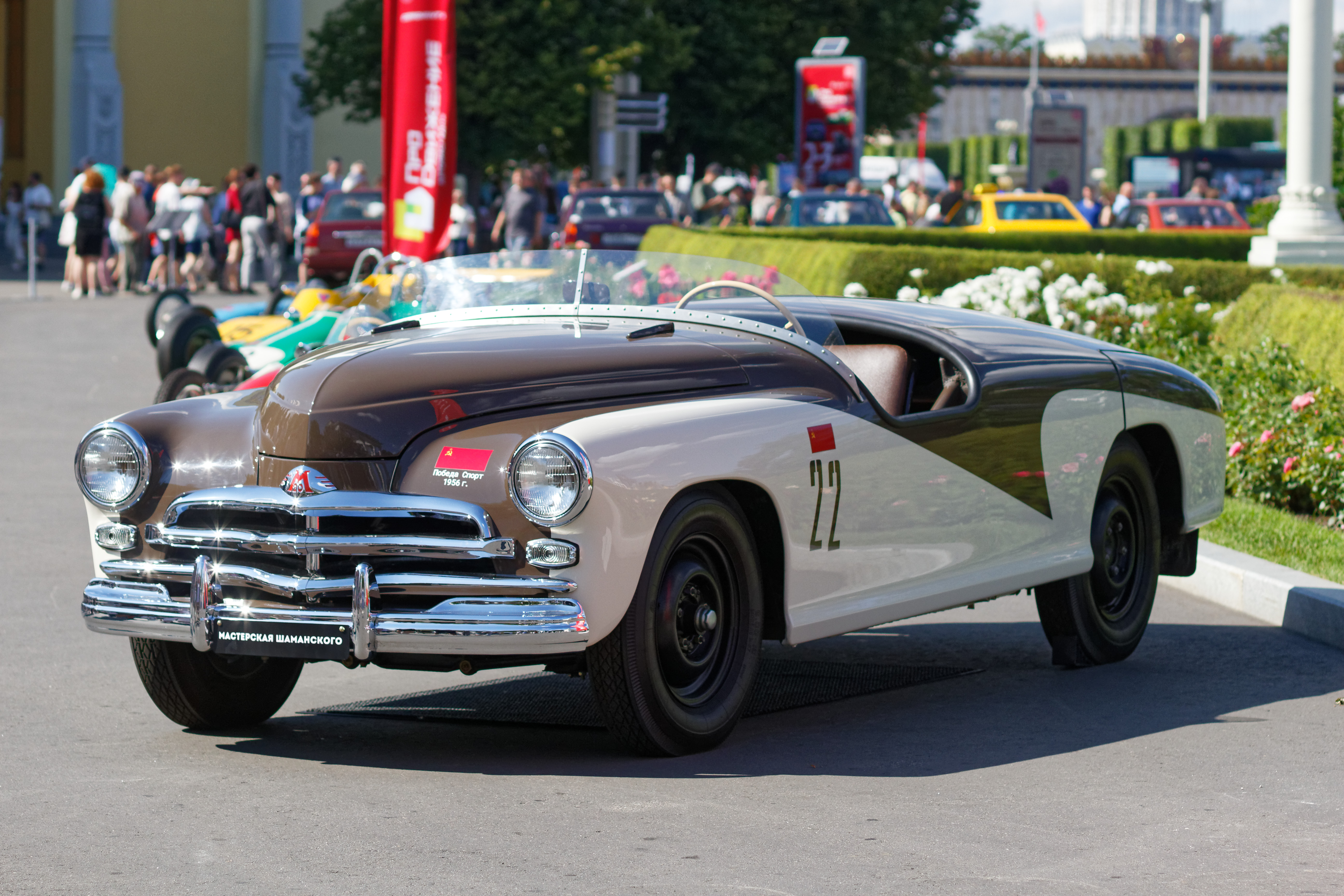
1956 GAZ-Pobeda-Sport

- Stock versions:
  - 1946–1948 – early GAZ-M-20s.
  - 1948–1954 – improved and massively produced cars with modernised leaf springs, thermostats and manual gears; heaters, water pumps and mechanical clock were added to the cars of this generation.
  - 1955–1958 – GAZ-20V equipped with a new 52-PS engine and a radio.
- Other versions:
  - A 4-door sedan prototype, the Pobeda-NAMI, was designed by NAMI in 1948 as a replacement for the M-20. While much of the car was identical to the production version, the difference was in the interior. The front bench seat was replaced with bucket seats and the smaller size of the front seats allowed the rear seat and trunk wall to be moved forward, increasing trunk space. The model did not enter production as redesigning the production car would take too long and also the shape of the car was less recognizable compared to the production version. GAZ did not produce a sedan until the Volga in 1956.
  - A prototype cab-over-engine (forward control) vehicle, the GAZ-013, was based on the Pobeda, but did not enter production.
  - A column shift, synchromesh gearbox appeared in 1950, replacing the floor-shifted "crash box". In 1949 debuted a cabriolet (without a separate designation, surviving until 1953), and a taxi M-20A, with cheaper interior (first regular taxi model in Moscow); some of the cabriolets were also used as taxis.
  - In 1949–53, 14,222 GAZ-20B-31s were built with a 4-door convertible body of a cabrio coach type, but sales were poor and the GAZ never returned to the idea of mass-producing a convertible. The only reason to create a cabriolet, less practical in the Soviet climate, was due to post-war restrictions on sheet metal production capabilities.
  - In 1955, GAZ released its first 4x4 sedan since the 1941 GAZ-61. The GAZ-M72 was the first comfortable, mass-produced, monocoque all-wheel drive vehicle, with a four-wheel drive system adapted from the contemporary Soviet GAZ-69. It was the brainchild of Vitaly Grachev, assistant to the GAZ-69's chief engineer, Grigory Moiseevich Wasserman. It used a standard Pobeda transmission, mated to the GAZ-69 front axle, leaf spring suspension, and transfer case, with a brand-new rear axle (used on no other vehicle, a rarity for Soviet car production). The body had fourteen panels added to strengthen the floor, frame, doors, and roof. Trim and interior were otherwise the same as the M20, and in all, 4,677 were built by end of production in 1958.
  - A limited edition M20G for the KGB (number unknown, but very small), powered by a 3,485 cc (213 cu in) straight six (from the GAZ M12 ZIM), was also produced, giving the Pobeda a top speed reportedly 140 km/h (87 mph), and 0–60 mph (97 km/h) time was down to 16 seconds from the stock model's 34; handling was compromised by the extra front-end weight. Also known as GAZ-26.
  - Separately, many taxi fleets, depots and repair plants made a variety of pickups and vans from Pobedas that had exhausted their resource. Unlike the factory produced M415 predecessor, these pick-up trucks varied in design from each other as they were built by separate organizations all around the Soviet Union. It is known that many pickups were painted brown and chocolate. According to some reports, the main reason for this was the desire to hide rust, which almost always appeared on worn bodies. At the same time, there were box vans based on the GAZ-M20V, manufactured by the auto repair plant of Glavmosavtotrans from the Pobeda. There were also refrigerated vans of Glavmosavtotrans, created jointly with VNIHI.

Total production of the Pobeda was 235,999, including 37,492 taxis and 14,222 cabriolets. A great number of cars was used by government organizations and government-owned corporations, including taxicab parks (there were no private taxis in the USSR). Despite its 16,000 ruble price tag, with average wage 800 ruble, the Pobeda was available to buy for ordinary citizens, and by 1954–1955 the demand for cars in the USSR started to exceed production, and there appeared long queues to buy a car. The Pobeda provided the first serious opportunity for the Soviet automobile industry to export cars, and "Western drivers found it to be almost indestructible".

The Pobeda was replaced by the GAZ M21 Volga.

== Export ==
The car was a successful export for the USSR, and the design was licensed to the Polish FSO (Passenger Automobile Factory) factory in Warsaw, where it was built as the FSO Warszawa beginning in 1951, continuing until 1973. A few were reported to have been assembled in Pyongyang, North Korea, although this appears to have been a hoax. One example was shown in China as the Yuejin CN-750 but this never entered production and was most likely a Russian-made car.

The Pobeda was popular in Finland, where postwar import controls limited the availability of Western cars. It was the most popular car for taxis in the 1950s, and as late as 1963 there were still 5,644 Pobedas registered in the country. The name of Finnish rock band Popeda is an intentional misspelling of "Pobeda", chosen in ironic contrast to another band called Rock Cadillac.

== Technical details ==
Weighing 1,350 kg (2,976 lb), the Pobeda has a 2.1-litre sidevalve straight-four engine, derived from Chrysler's flathead six-cylinder design. It produced 50 PS (37 kW) and achieved a top speed of 105 km/h (65 mph).

== Gallery ==
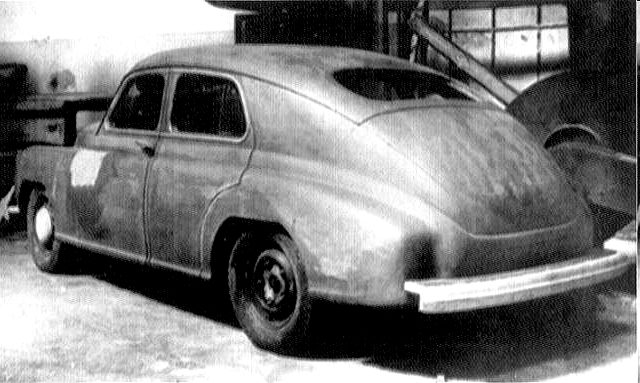
Clay model, 1943–1944

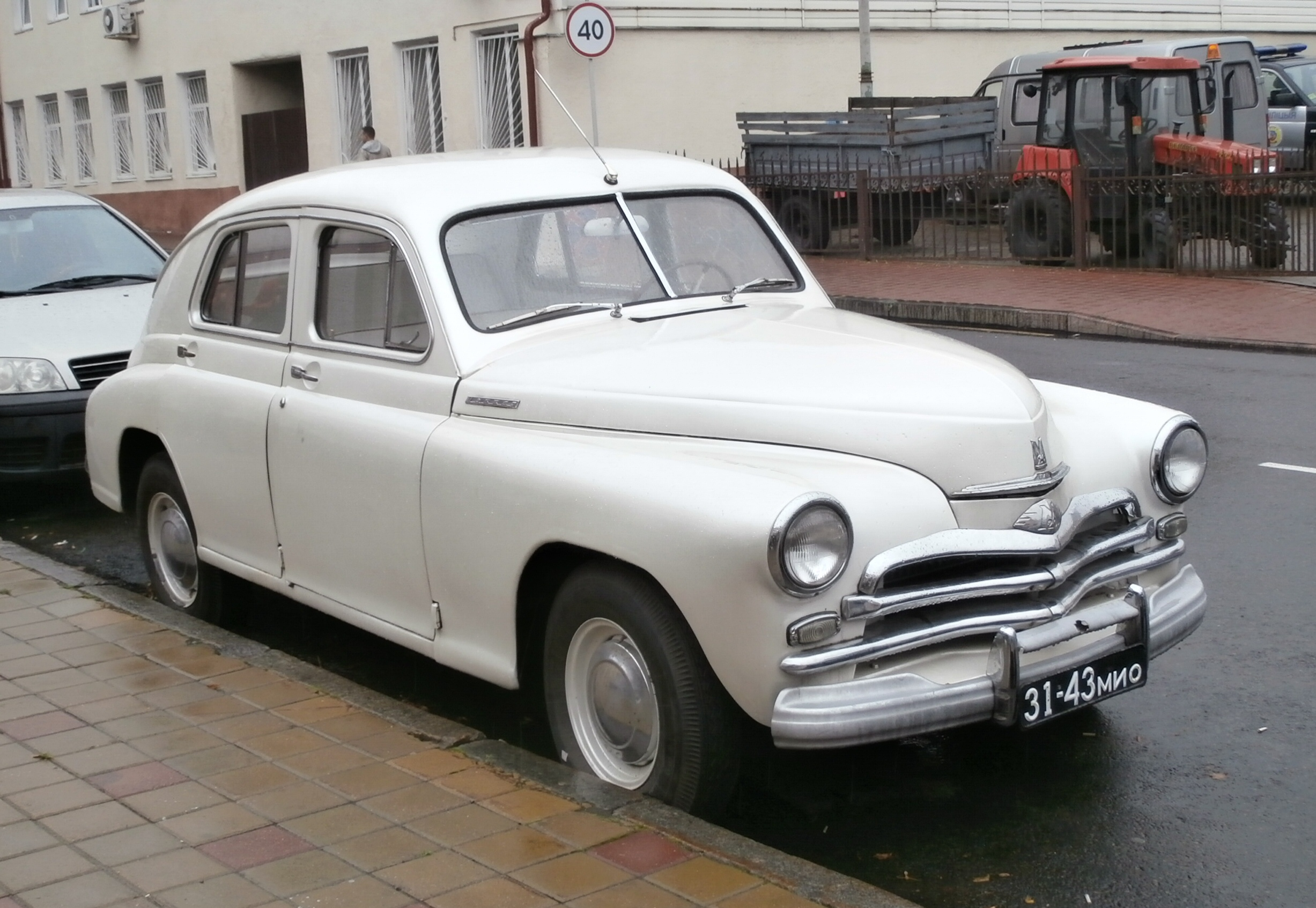
GAZ M20 (1948–1955)

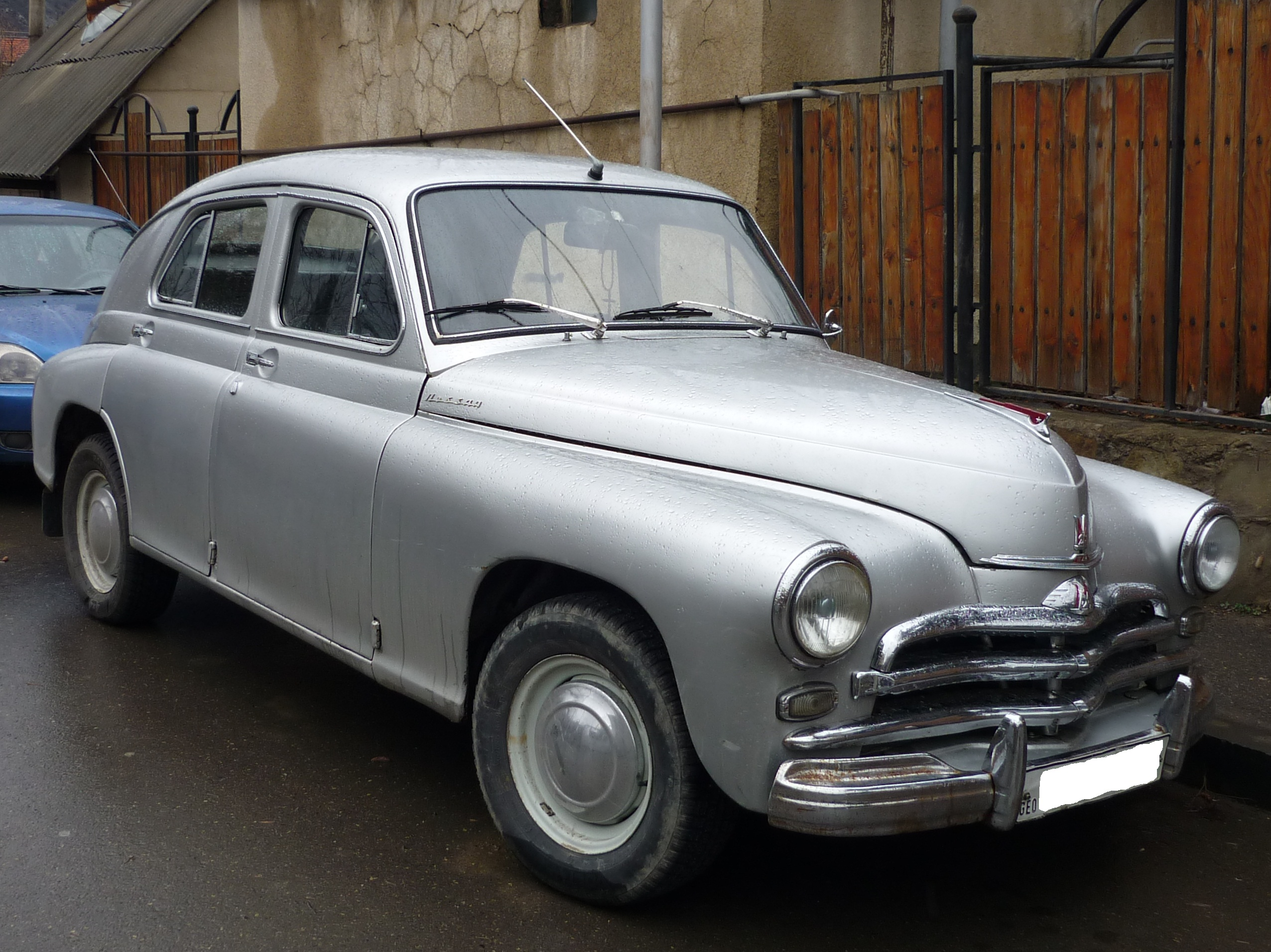
GAZ-M20V (1955–1958)

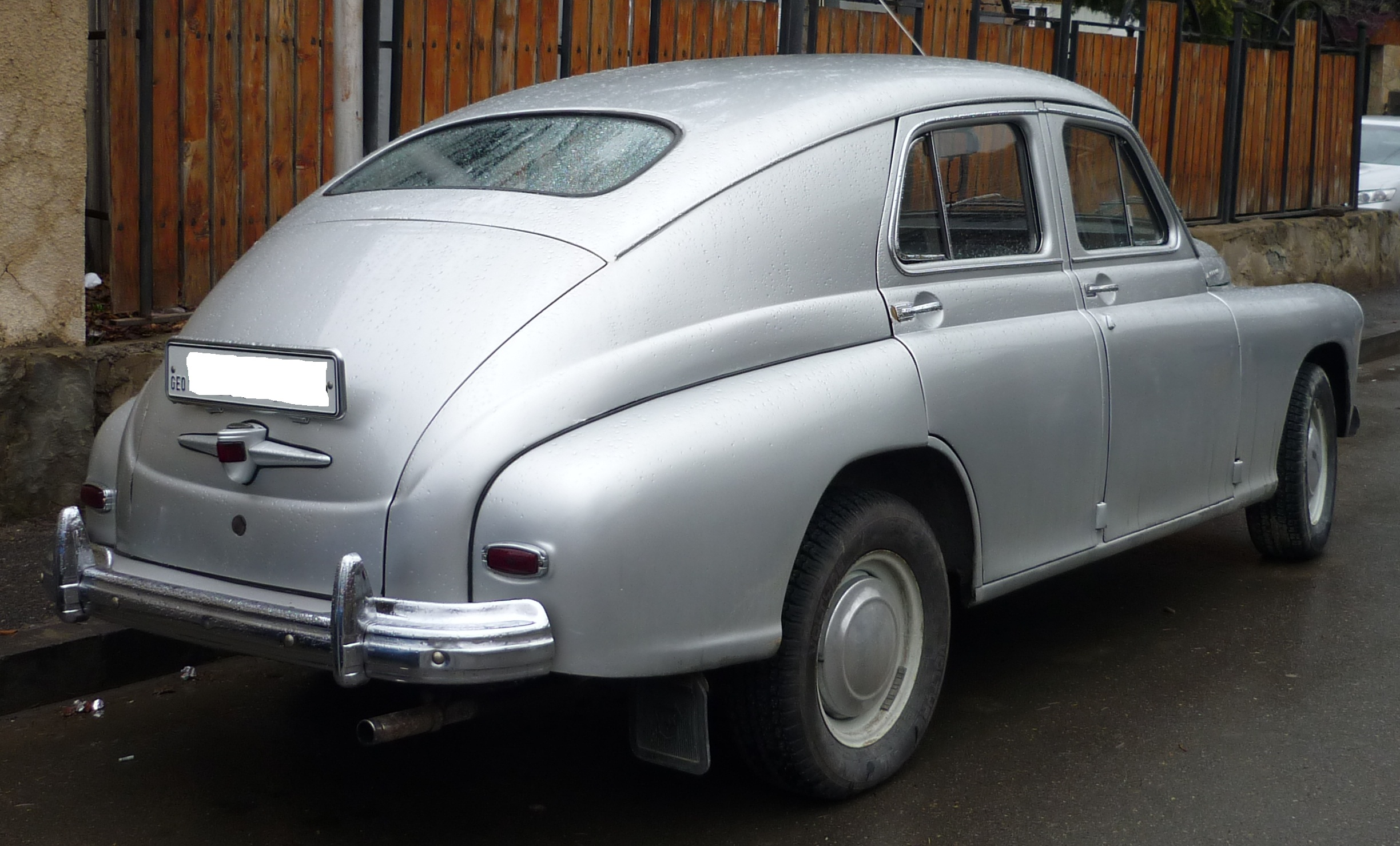
GAZ-M20V (rear view)

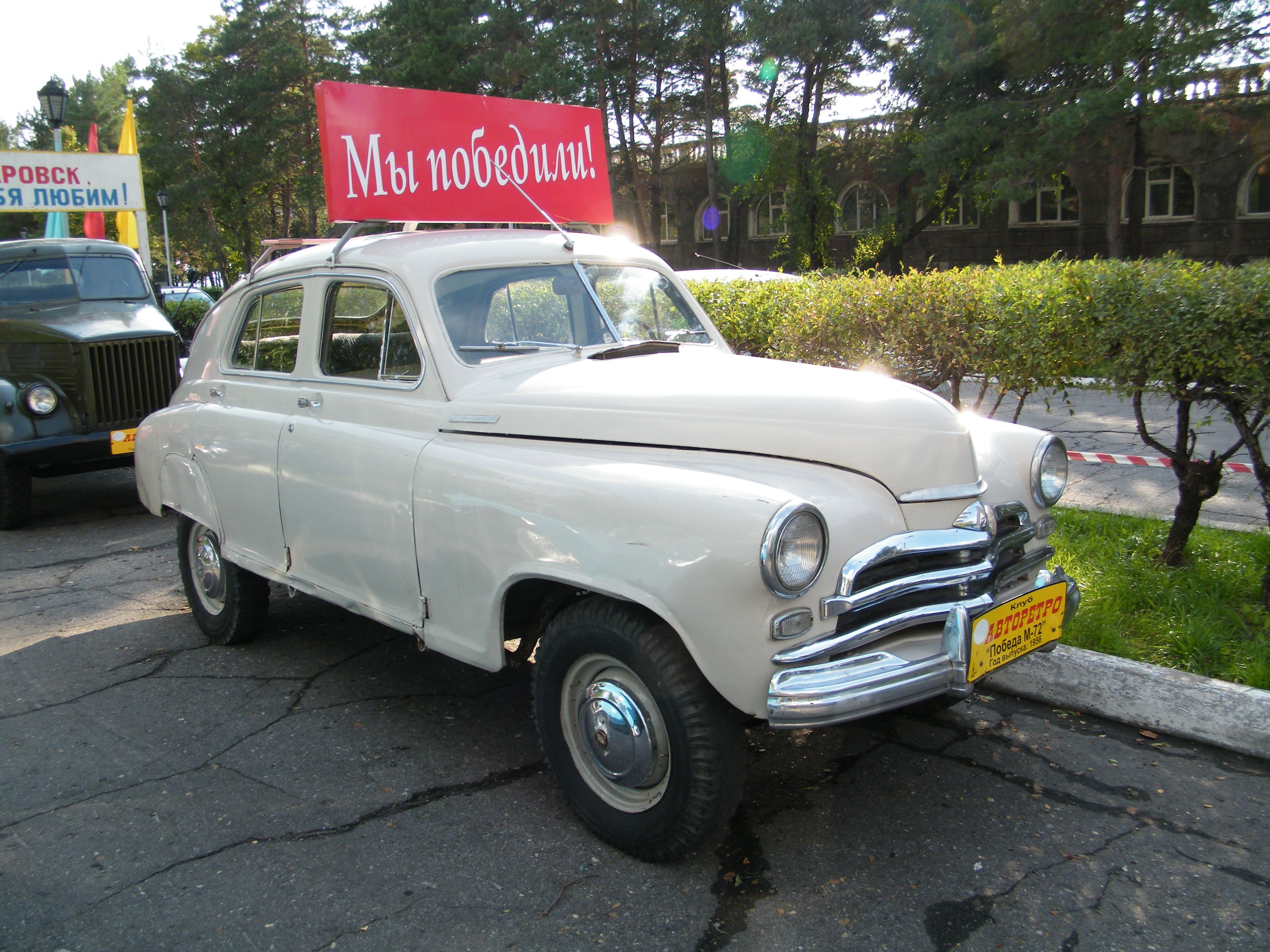
GAZ-M72 (1955–1958)

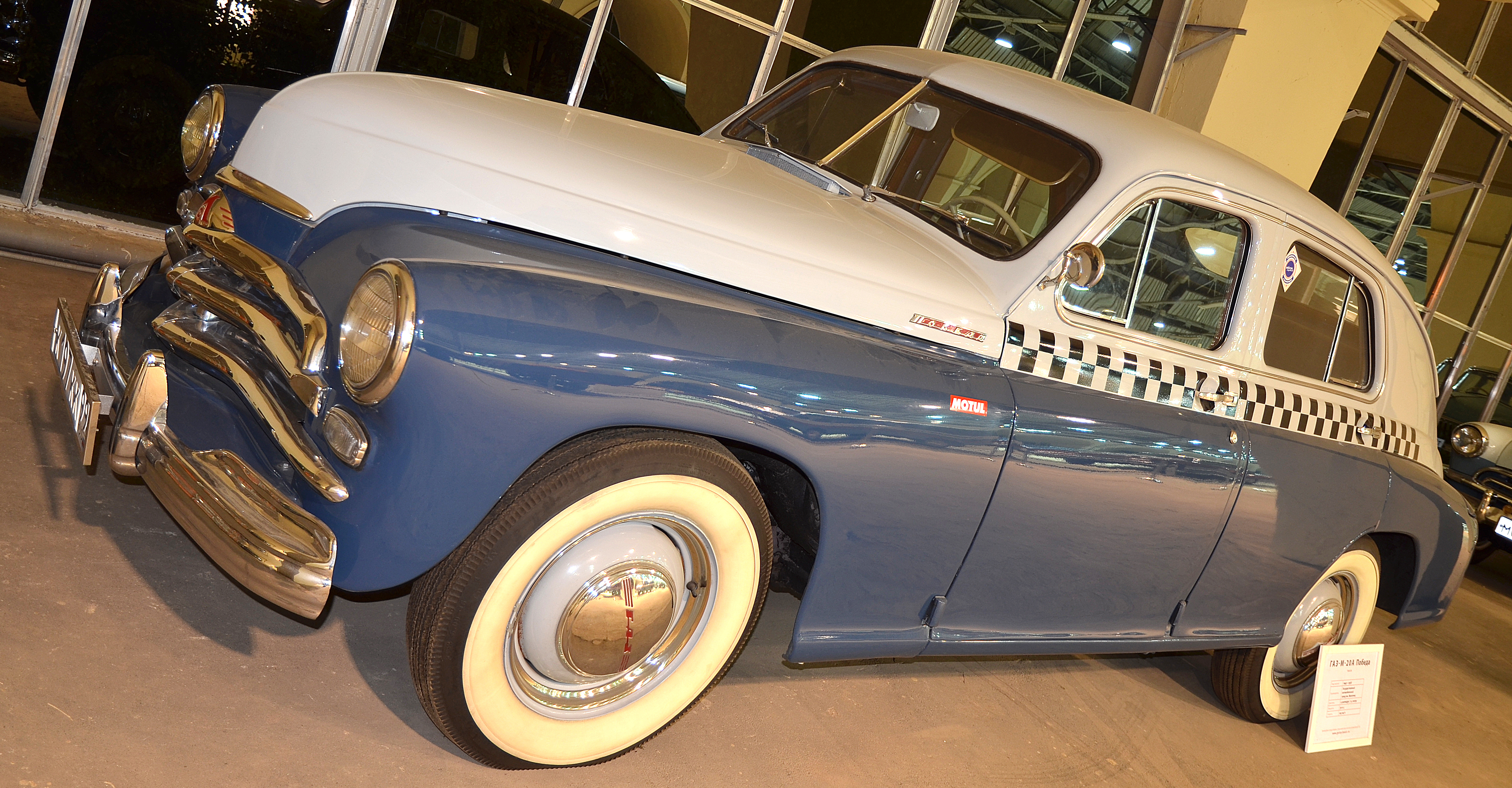
GAZ-M20A taxi cab
