= 1932 Ford =

1932 Ford Model B
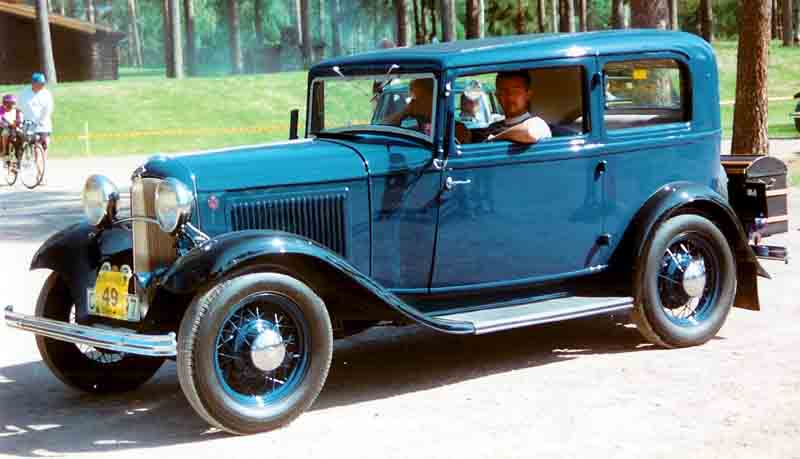
- 1932 Ford Model B Standard Tudor 2-door sedan

Overview
- Manufacturer: Ford
- Production: 1932–1934
- Assembly: Full list
- Designer: Edsel Ford

Body and chassis
- Class: Full-size Ford
- Body style: 2-door roadster 2-door coupe 2-door sedan 4-door sedan 2-door cabriolet 4-door phaeton Pickup
- Layout: FR layout
- Related: Ford Model Y Ford Köln; Ford Rheinland; GAZ-M1

Powertrain
- Engine: 201 cu in (3.3 L) L-head-I4 (Model B); 221 cu in (3.6 L) "Flathead" V8 (Models 18 and 40)
- Transmission: 3-speed sliding-mesh manual

Dimensions
- Wheelbase: 1932: 106.0 in (2,692 mm); 1933: 112.0 in (2,845 mm); 1934: 112.0 in (2,845 mm)

Chronology
- Predecessor: Ford Model A
- Successor: Ford Model 48

The term 1932 Ford may refer to three models of automobile produced by Ford Motors between 1932 and 1934: the Model B, the Model 18, and the Model 40. These succeeded the Model A. The Model B had an updated four-cylinder engine and was available from 1932 to 1934. The Model 18 was the first Ford fitted with the flathead V-8, and it was available in the Model 40 too in 1933 and 1934. The company also replaced the Model AA truck with the Model BB, available with either the four- or eight-cylinder engine.

The three car models were replaced by the streamlined Model 48 in 1935.

== Technical ==
Rather than just updating the Model A, Ford launched a completely new vehicle for 1932. The V8 was marketed as the Model 18 in its initial year, but was commonly known as the Ford V‑8. It had the new flathead V8 engine. The Model 18 was the first low-priced, mass-marketed car to have a V8 engine -- an important milestone in the American automotive industry. The 221 cu in (3.6 L) V8 was rated at 65 horsepower (48 kW; 66 PS), but power increased significantly with improvements to the carburetor and ignition in succeeding years. The V8 was more popular than the four-cylinder, which was essentially a variant of the Model A engine with improvements to balancing and lubrication.

The Model B was derived with as few technical changes as possible to keep cost low. It was virtually indistinguishable from the V-8, aside from the engine and the badging on the hub caps and headlamp support bar (later: grille). Its intention was to be a price leader, and, as it offered more than the popular Model A, this should have been a winning formula. In fact, the newer and only slightly more expensive V-8 stole the show, and made the Model B obsolete. The V8 engine was previously exclusive to Lincoln products, which, in 1932, switched to V12 engines only.

Although there was a certain visual similarity with the predecessor Model A, the car was of new design. While the Model A had a simple frame with two straight longitudinal members, the new car received a longer wheelbase, along with an outward curved, double-dropped chassis. In both models, the fuel tank was relocated from the cowl, as it was in the Model A and late Model T (where the back of the tank formed the dashboard), to the lower rear of the car, as is typical in modern vehicles. This required Ford to include an engine-driven fuel pump, rather than rely on gravity feed. While the V8 was developed from scratch, the B had an improved four-cylinder Model A engine of 201 cu in (3.3 L) displacement producing 50 hp (37 kW; 51 PS).

Design of this vehicle was supervised by then-Ford president Edsel Ford, but the creation of the Flathead V8 power plant was mostly under the supervision of Henry Ford.

== 1932 ==
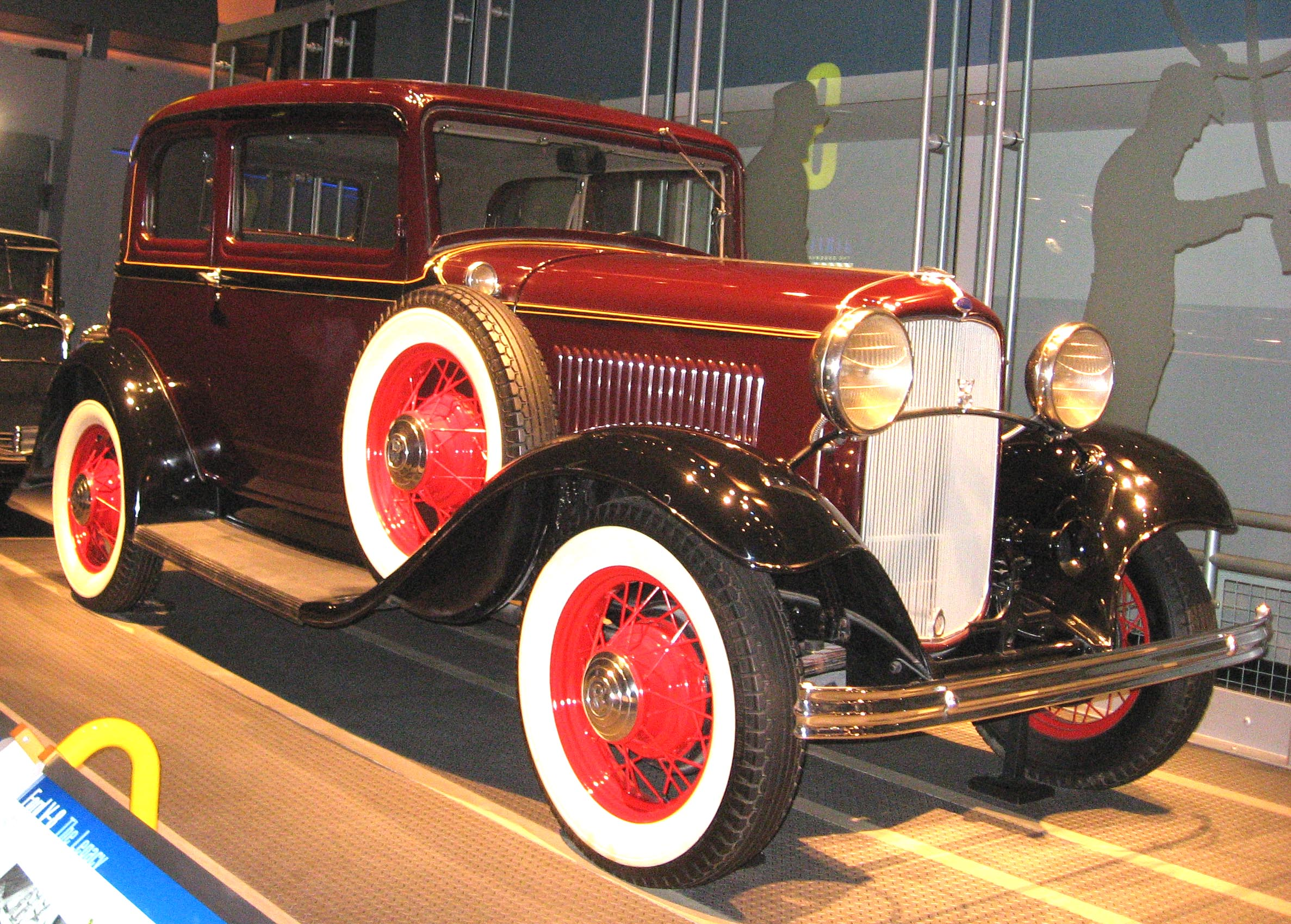
1932 Ford V8 Standard Tudor Model 18 with optional color-keyed wheels, white wall tires, and side mounts

When Ford introduced the Model A in late 1927, there were several competitors also offering four-cylinder cars, among them Chevrolet, Dodge, Durant, and Willys. That changed within a few years, soon leaving the new Plymouth the sole major make in the Ford's price class with a four.

Although sharing a common platform, Model Bs and Model 18s came not only in Standard and Deluxe trim, they were available in a large variety of body styles. Some of them, such as the commercial cars described below, were only available as Standards, and a few other came only in Deluxe trim. There were two-door roadster, two-door cabriolet, four-door phaeton, two and four-door sedans, four-door "woodie" station wagon, two-door convertible sedan, panel and sedan deliveries, five-window coupe, a sport coupe (stationary softtop), the three-window Deluxe Coupe, and pickup. The wooden panels were manufactured at the Ford Iron Mountain Plant in the Michigan Upper Peninsula from Ford owned lumber. One of the more well known and popular models was the two-door Victoria, which was largely designed by Edsel Ford. It was a smaller version of the Lincoln Victoria coupe, built on the Lincoln K-series chassis with a V8 engine; by 1933 Lincoln no longer used a V8 and only offered the V12, with the V8 now exclusive to Ford branded vehicles.

Prices ranged from US$495 for the roadster, $490 for the coupés, and $650 for the convertible sedan. Production totals numbered from 12,597 for the roadster to 124,101 for the two-door sedan. Ford sold 298,647 V8-powered 18s in 1932, and except for the fact Ford could not keep up with V8 demand, the essentially identical four-cylinder B would have been a sales disaster: dealers switched customers to them from the V8, and even then sold only 133,539, in part because the V8 cost just US$10 more.

The B was discontinued because buyers disliked four-cylinder models in general, and because of the huge success of the V8, not for being an inferior car. In fact, it persisted a little longer in Europe, where in many countries the tax system heavily favored smaller-displacement engines.

All 1932 Fords—V8-8s and Model Bs—came with black fenders, wire wheels, and a rear-mounted spare wheel (side mounted on cars equipped with a tail gate). Options included single or twin side mounts, luggage rack, clock, interior and exterior mirrors, and choice of leather or (for closed cars) broadcloth interior material. Paints were Pyroxylin (nitrocellulose) lacquer.

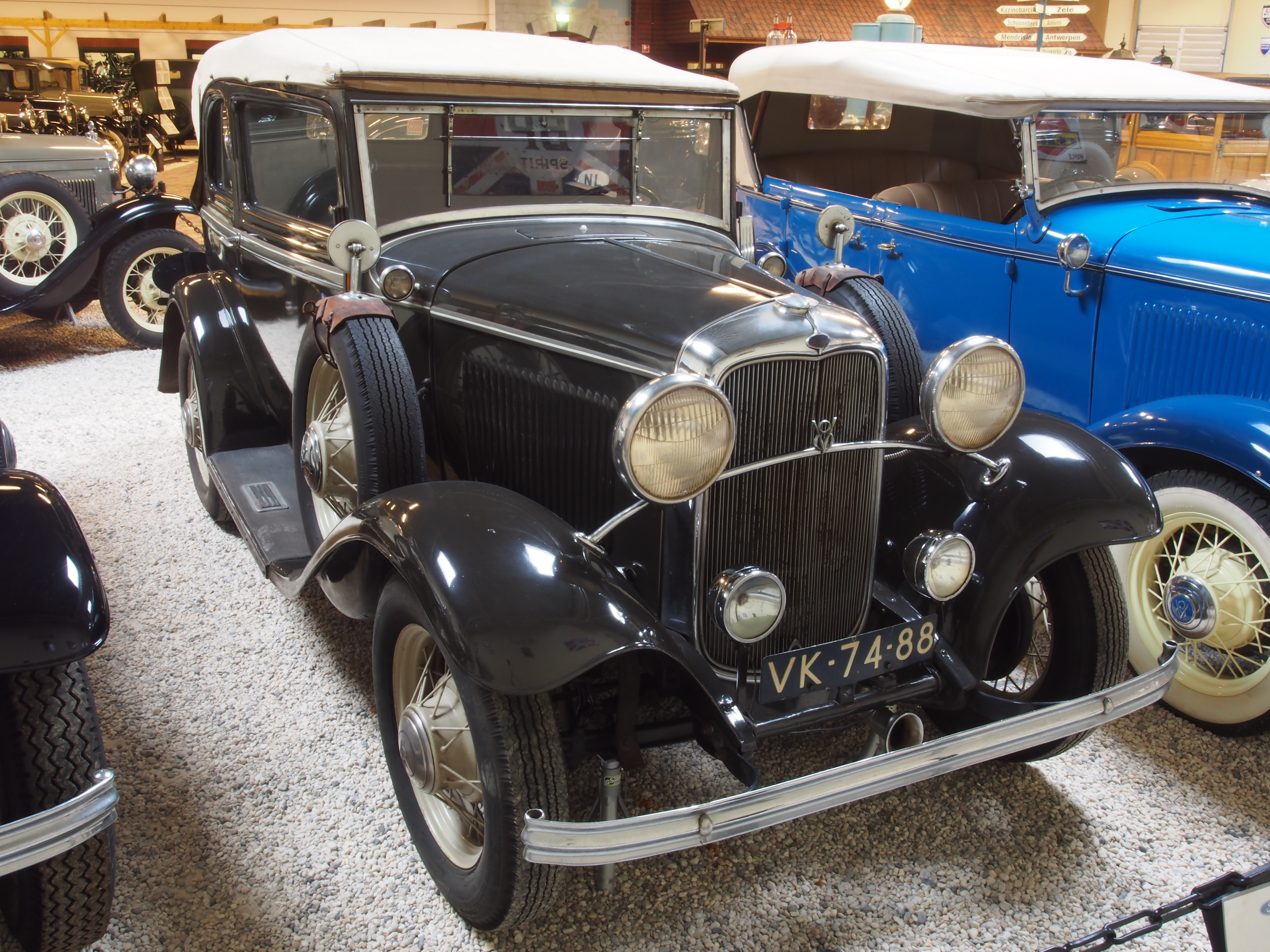
1932 Ford B 400

One special type was the flathead V8-engined B400, of which only 842 were made. This was a two-door cabrio coach, a convertible coupe with fixed side window frames. Most of them were exported for overseas markets or ambassador use. Since sales were poor, it was soon discontinued, becoming the rarest of 1932 Fords. The B400 bodystyle was replaced by a more expensive full convertible.

=== Standard and Deluxe trim ===
The B shared frame, bodies, and even most of the trim with the eight-cylinder car. The only technical difference was the use of the slightly reworked Model A engine, thus the designation B. Most body styles were available as Standard or Deluxe variants with either engine as an option. Customers could get a Deluxe 1932 Model B as a roadster, phaeton, Tudor, or Fordor, as well as the Deluxe-only three-window coupé.

Standard trim meant black front window frame, black wire wheels (color optional), black horn (chrome-plated optional), single tail light (second optional), painted dash, position lights integrated in the head lamps (Deluxe cowl lamps optional), and less expensive interiors.

== 1933 ==
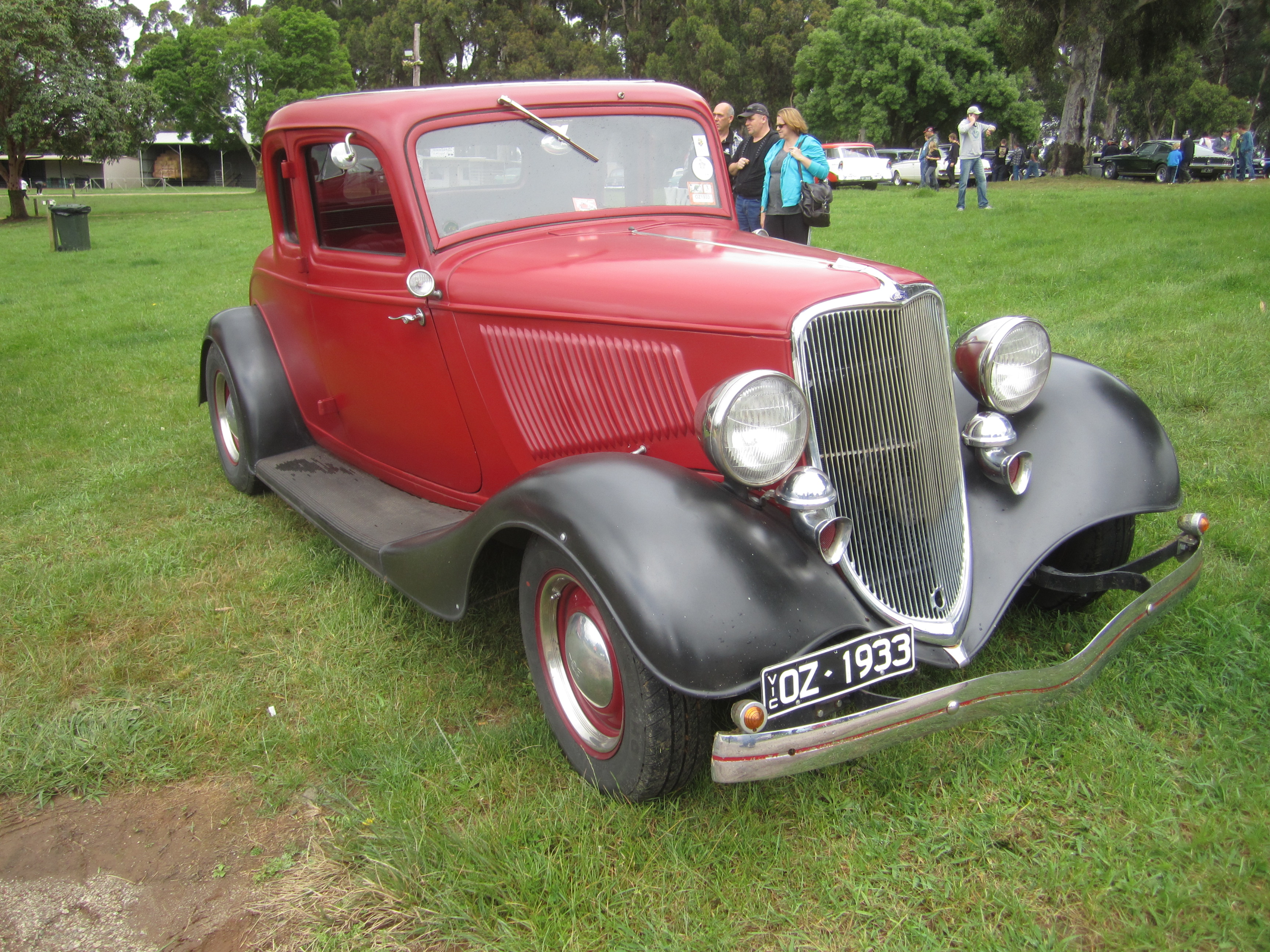
1933 Ford Model B Standard 5 Window Coupe. This car has incorrect wheels. Painted window frame indicates a Standard. Twin chromed horns and cowl lamps were a popular option for Standard models, included on Deluxes.

When the Model 40 and the new B were introduced February 9, 1933, revisions of the car were substantial, especially considering how important the 1932 change had been. For its second year, the wheelbase was stretched, from 106 in (2692 mm) to 112 in (2845 mm) on a new crossmember frame. The grille was revised, gaining a pointed forward slope at the bottom which resembled either a spade, a Medieval shield, or possibly the 1932 Packard Light Eight in general outline anyway. Both the grille and hood louvers curved down and forward. The overall design and grille were inspired by the English Ford Model Y. Streamlining was further accentuated by the new hood which now covered the cowl, giving an impression of more length. In addition, there were more rounded and skirted fenders and new, elegantly bowed bumpers. Headlamp support bars were no longer in use, and there were new wire wheels. The cars got a new dashboard with instruments set in an oval insert in front of the driver. There was a glove box on the passenger side. Closed Deluxe models received heavy DI-NOC (PVC) woodgraining (Note: DiNoc was a widely used photographic method of applying wood imitation on metal surfaces.) on dash and window frames, and there were deeper seat cushions.

There were 10 body styles (14 if standard and Deluxe trim levels are counted separately). Now, all were available for V-8s and the Model B, which thus got Deluxe models, too. Convertible Coupes and Victoria came in Deluxe trim only, and the most expensive car in the line, the "woody", as a Standard only. It cost US$590 with the four-cylinder engine.

The cars gained about 3 percent in weight, compensated for with more powerful engines, as on the V-8 with its 15 percent increase in power.

=== "Model C" ===
Power from the V8 rose to 75 hp (56 kW) with a revised ignition system. The four-cylinder engine continued unchanged, but was referred to (by some) as the Model C, though Ford never referred to its "Improved Four-Cylinder engine" as a "Model C" engine. There is some dispute over this; some sources say it was a common misconception due to the introduction of a larger counterbalanced crankshaft during the Model B engine production, and the letter "C" casting mark on most, but not all, of the Model B heads. On the other side, this integrally counterweighted crankshaft was first introduced for truck engines only. When they proved superior concerning smoothness and longevity, they were introduced for worldwide four cylinder production. Together with the fact that there were huge quantities of "B" code engines in stock that needed to be used up, this explains why there are "B" and "C" coded engines in some model years. As Canadian-built cars used the prefix "C" on their identification plates, there is another source for errors. Model Bs start with prefix "AB", V-8s with "18-1". (Model A part number suffix was ‑A, Police Special High Compression head part number suffix was ‑b, and there was a fairly large letter "B" casting mark about the center of the head.)

== 1934 ==
The 1934 Ford (the Model 40B) was not as substantial a model year change as the previous two years had been. Noticeable changes included a flatter grille with a wider surround and fewer bars, straight hood louvers, two handles on each side of the hood, smaller head lights and cowl lamps, and a reworked logo. The bare metal dash insert was replaced by painted steel.

V‑8 output was again increased, this time to 85 hp (63 kW), and the four-cylinder Model B engine was in its last year, as was the Victoria body style; nevertheless, there were fourteen body options, the Tudor being top-seller. The standard three-window coupe was deleted.

Deluxes had pinstriping, again twin (chromed) horns, and twin back lights. Inside, they got more elaborate wood graining.

The 1934 Ford V-8 is well-known for having been the vehicle in which the notorious Depression-era bandits Bonnie Parker and Clyde Barrow were ambushed and killed. Barrow preferred to steal the powerful Ford V-8, and was driving a 1934 sedan on May 23, 1934, when a heavily armed law enforcement posse opened fire and riddled the pair with bullets and buckshot in Bienville Parish, Louisiana.

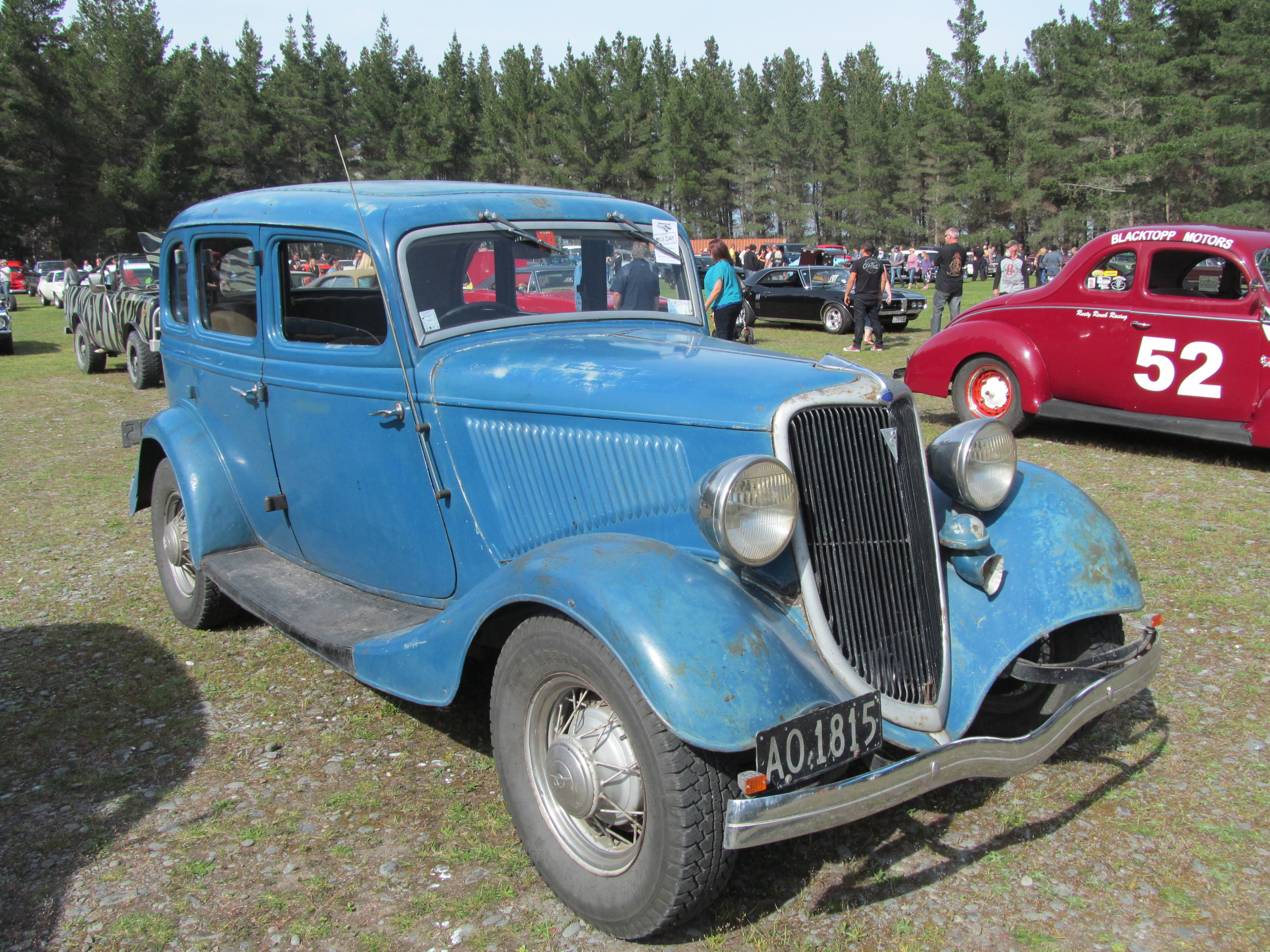
1934 Ford Model 40

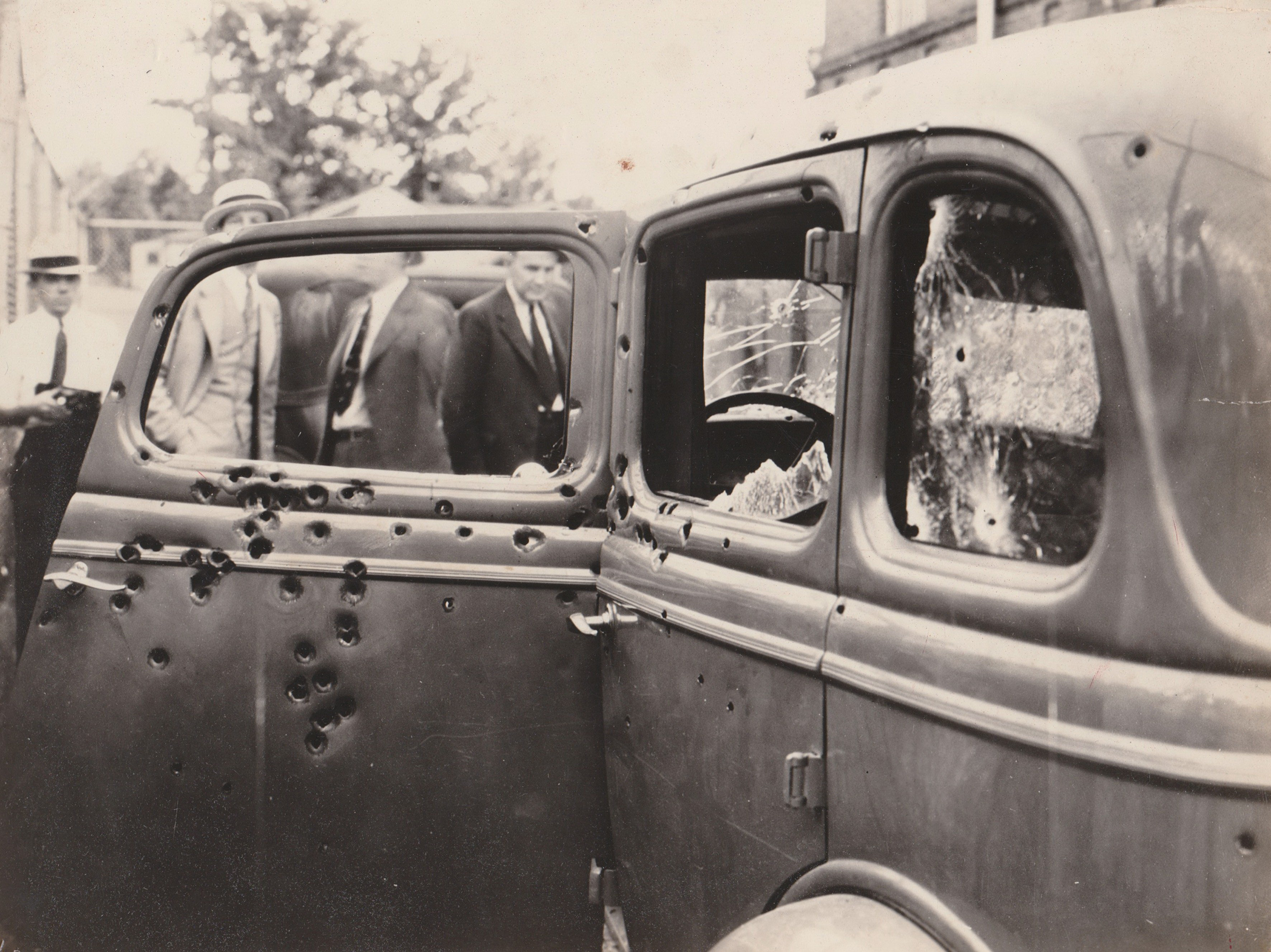
1934 Ford in which Bonnie and Clyde were ambushed and killed

=== 1934 Model 40 Special Speedster ===
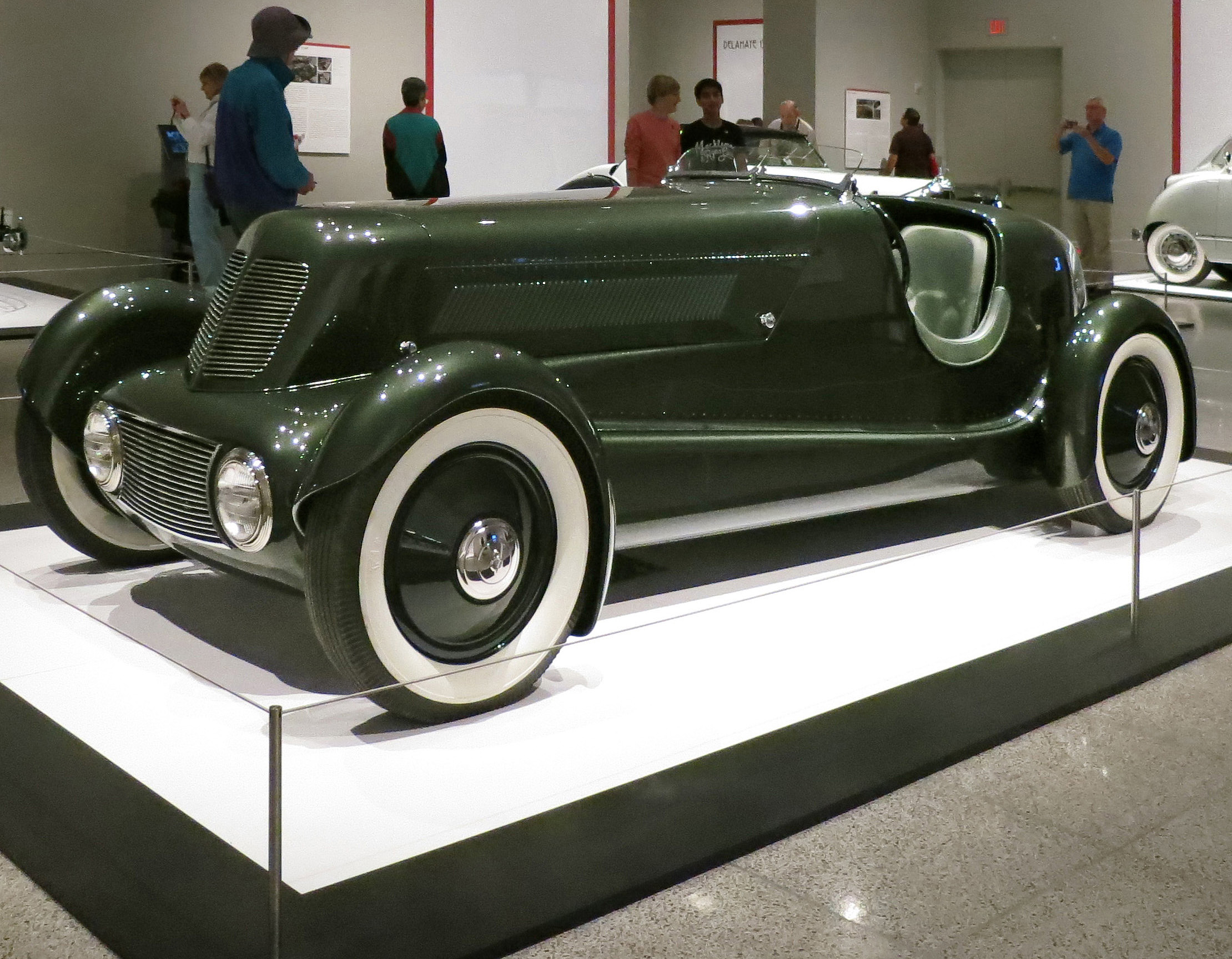
Edsel Ford's Model 40 Special Speedster

Edsel Ford commissioned Ford's chief designer, E.T. "Bob" Gregorie to design and supervise the construction of a personal sports car based on a style of period sports car Mr. Ford had seen in Europe. A special two seat roadster was built from aluminum and installed with a flathead V8 engine. Only one was built and is currently at the Ford House museum.

== Hot-rod variants ==
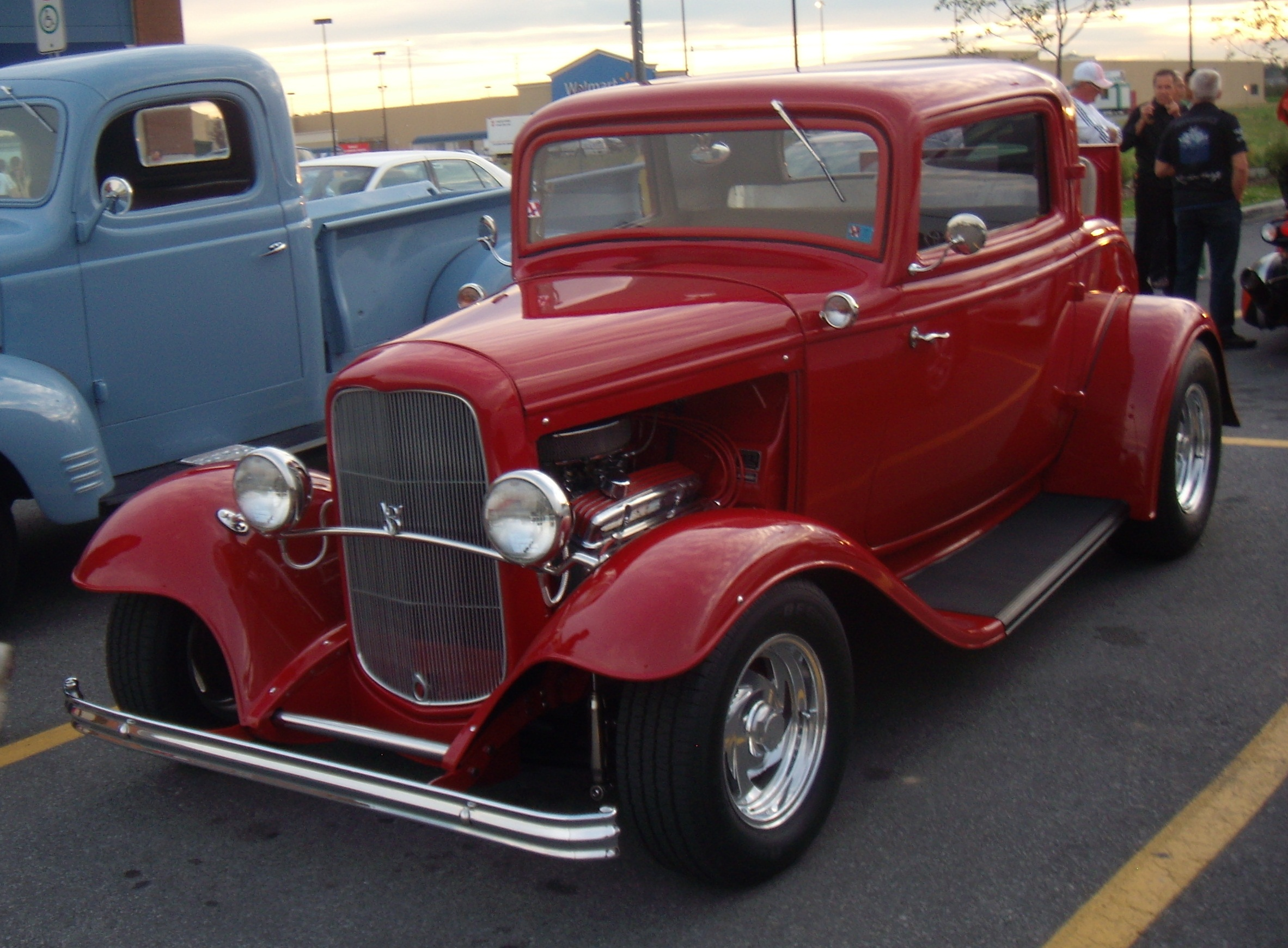
1932 Ford De Luxe Coupe V8 riding on modern low-profile wide wheels

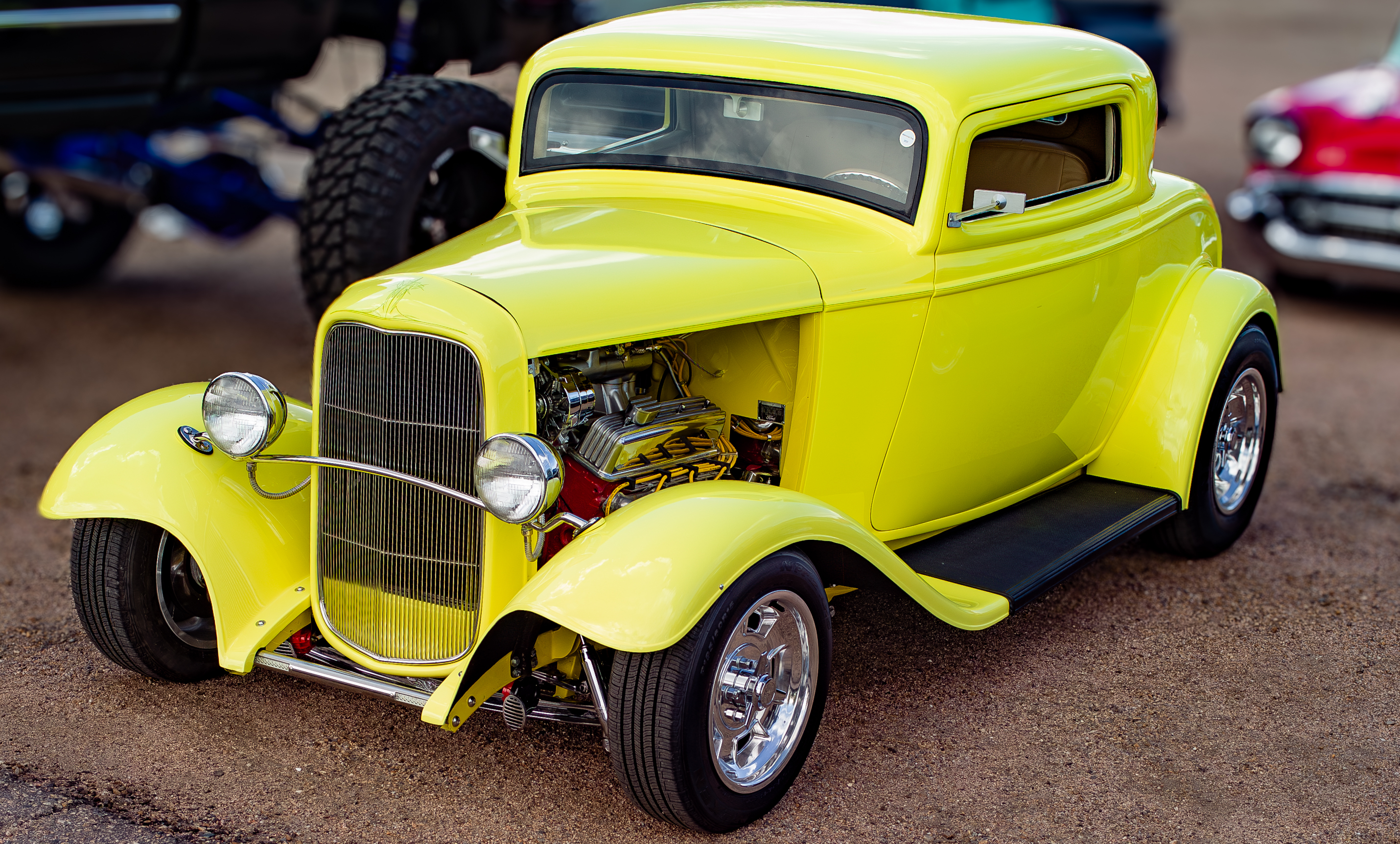
1932 Ford 3 Window Custom with chopped top

The 1932–1934 Fords are extremely popular with hot rodders. During the period after WWII, Model Bs and 18s were favored. This continued into the 1960s on a large scale. Today, the roadster and coupe are the most sought-after body styles, making unmodified examples rare. Since the 1970s, 1932 bodies and frames have been reproduced either in fiberglass or lately in steel, which has increased the number of cars being created or restored, typically as hot rods. These are often very expensive, and a typical show-quality car may sell for $60,000 or more.

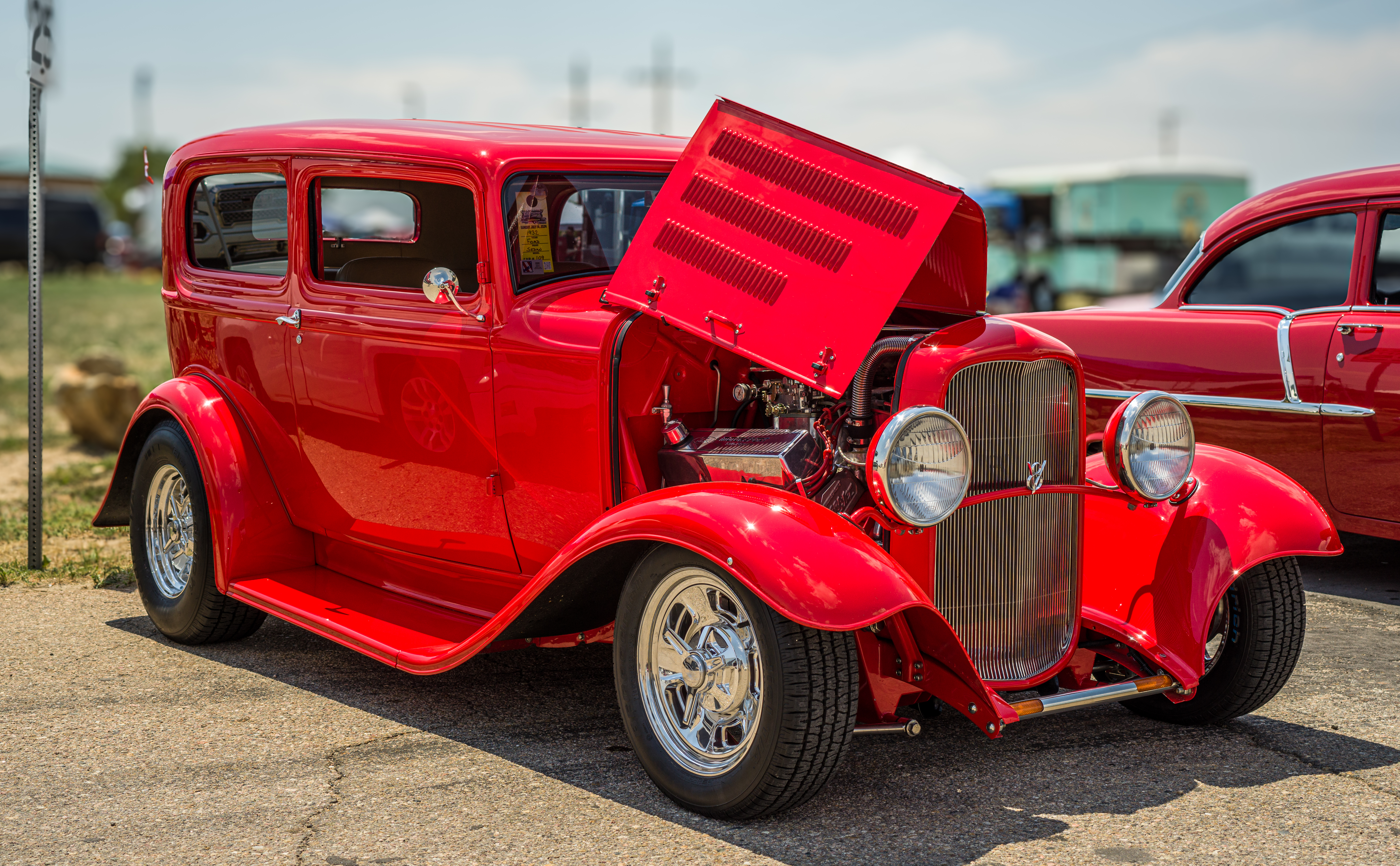
1932 Ford Tudor Sedan Hot Rod with Big Block Ford Engine

=== Deuce coupe ===
A deuce coupe (deuce indicating the year "2" in 1932) is a 1932 Ford coupe. The Model 18 coupe with its more powerful V8 engine was more popular than the four-cylinder Model B coupe. In the 1940s, the Model 18 was plentiful and cheap enough for young men to buy, becoming the basis for an ideal hot rod. Customizers would strip surplus weight off and "hop up" the engine for power - a metaphor drawing from one's behavior becoming more raucous when "hopped up" on beer. These "hot rods" came in two body styles, the more common 5-window and the rarer suicide door 3-window. The iconic stature of the 1932-vintage Ford in hot rodding inspired The Beach Boys to write their hit 1963 song "Little Deuce Coupe", which also was the name of the album it appeared on. The Deuce Coupe was also featured prominently in the 1973 hit film American Graffiti. The car is also famously referenced in the 1973 Bruce Springsteen song "Blinded by the Light", which was popularized by Manfred Mann's Earth Band in 1977.

Typical of builds from before World War Two were '35 Ford wire-spoke wheels. Immediately postwar, most hot rods changed from mechanical to hydraulic ("juice") brakes and from bulb to sealed-beam headlights. The "gow job" morphed into the "hot rod" in the early to middle 1950s. The mid-1950s and early 1960s custom deuce was typically fenderless and steeply chopped, and almost all Ford (or Mercury, with the 239 cu in (3,920 cc) flathead, introduced in 1939). A Halibrand quick-change rearend was also typical, and an Edelbrock intake manifold or Harman and Collins ignition magneto would not be uncommon. Reproduction spindles, brake drums, and backing based on the 1937s remain available today. Aftermarket "flatty" (flathead) cylinder heads were available from Barney Navarro, Vic Edelbrock, and Offenhauser. The first intake manifold Edelbrock sold was a "slingshot" design for the flathead V8. Front suspension hairpins were adapted from sprint cars, such as the Kurtis Krafts. The first Jimmy supercharger on a V8 may have been by Navarro in 1950.

Brookville Roadster was one of the first companies to reproduce car bodies in steel.

==== Little Deuce Coupe ====
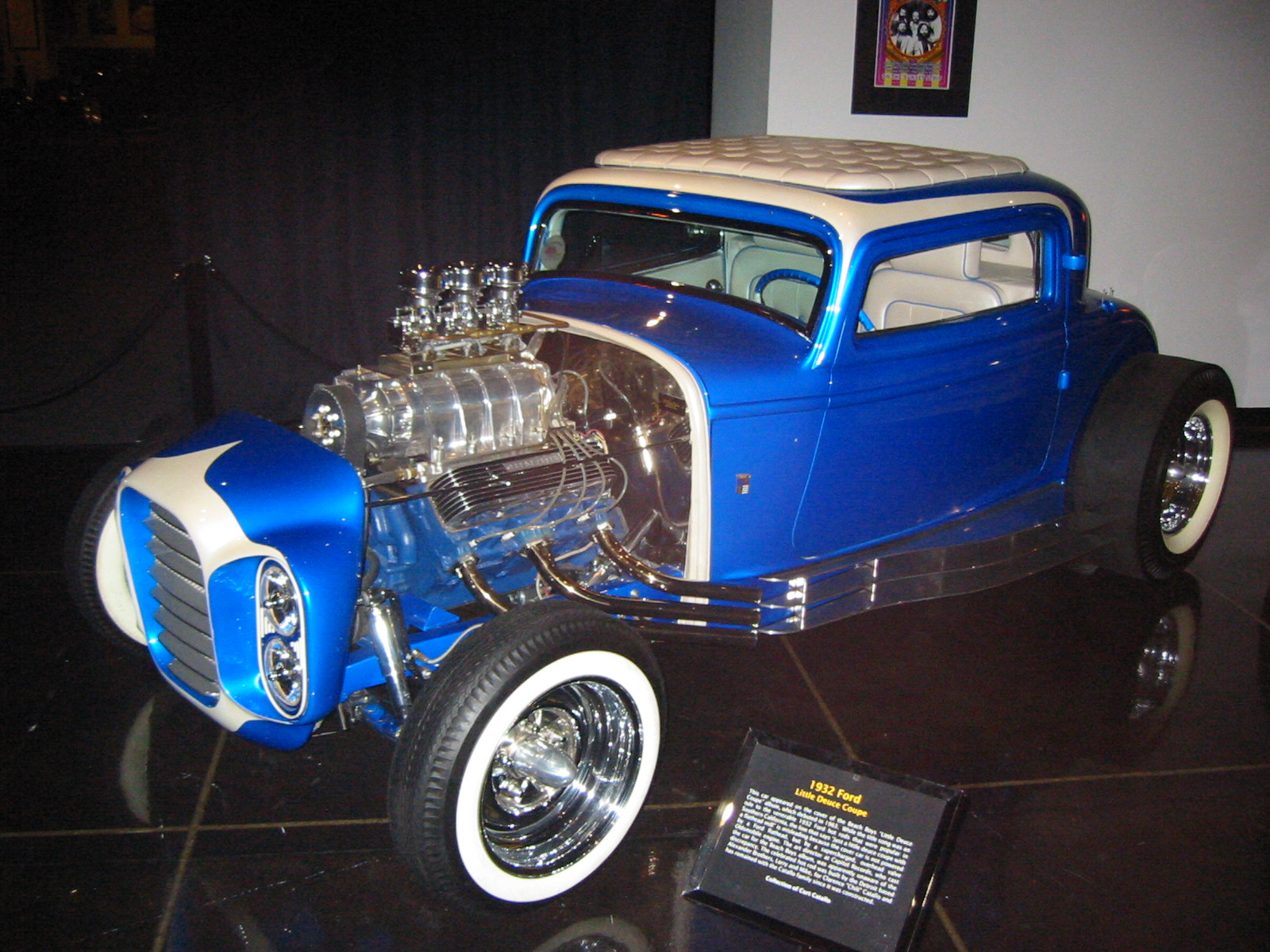
The "little deuce coupe" that appeared on the cover of the Beach Boys' album Little Deuce Coupe (1963)

The picture featured on the front cover of the Beach Boys' 1963 album Little Deuce Coupe was supplied by Hot Rod magazine, and features the body (with his head cropped in the photo) of the car's owner Clarence 'Chili' Catallo and his own customized three-window 1932 Ford coupe.

Catallo had bought the car in 1956 for $75 in Michigan when he was 15 years old. He chopped and channelled the car to lower the top by 6 in (150 mm), then replaced the stock Ford flathead V8 (as in the song) with a newer, more powerful OHV Oldsmobile Rocket V8. Much of the original customizing work, including the stacked headlights (from a later 1960 Chrysler 300H), side trim, and grille, was done by Mike and Larry Alexander in the Detroit suburb of Southfield.

After Catallo moved to Southern California, additional work, including the chopped top, was done in 1960–61 at Kustom City, George Barris' North Hollywood auto customizing shop. This led to the magazine cover and two years later, the shot was featured as the cover for The Beach Boys' fourth album. Catallo sold the coupe a few years later but, urged by his son Curt, was able to buy it back in the late 1990s for $40,000. The car had since been additionally modified but was restored by Catallo with many of the original parts, so it is again nearly identical to the famous photo. In 2000, the hot rod won the "People's Choice" award at the Meadow Brook Concours d'Elegance.

=== Modern hot rods ===
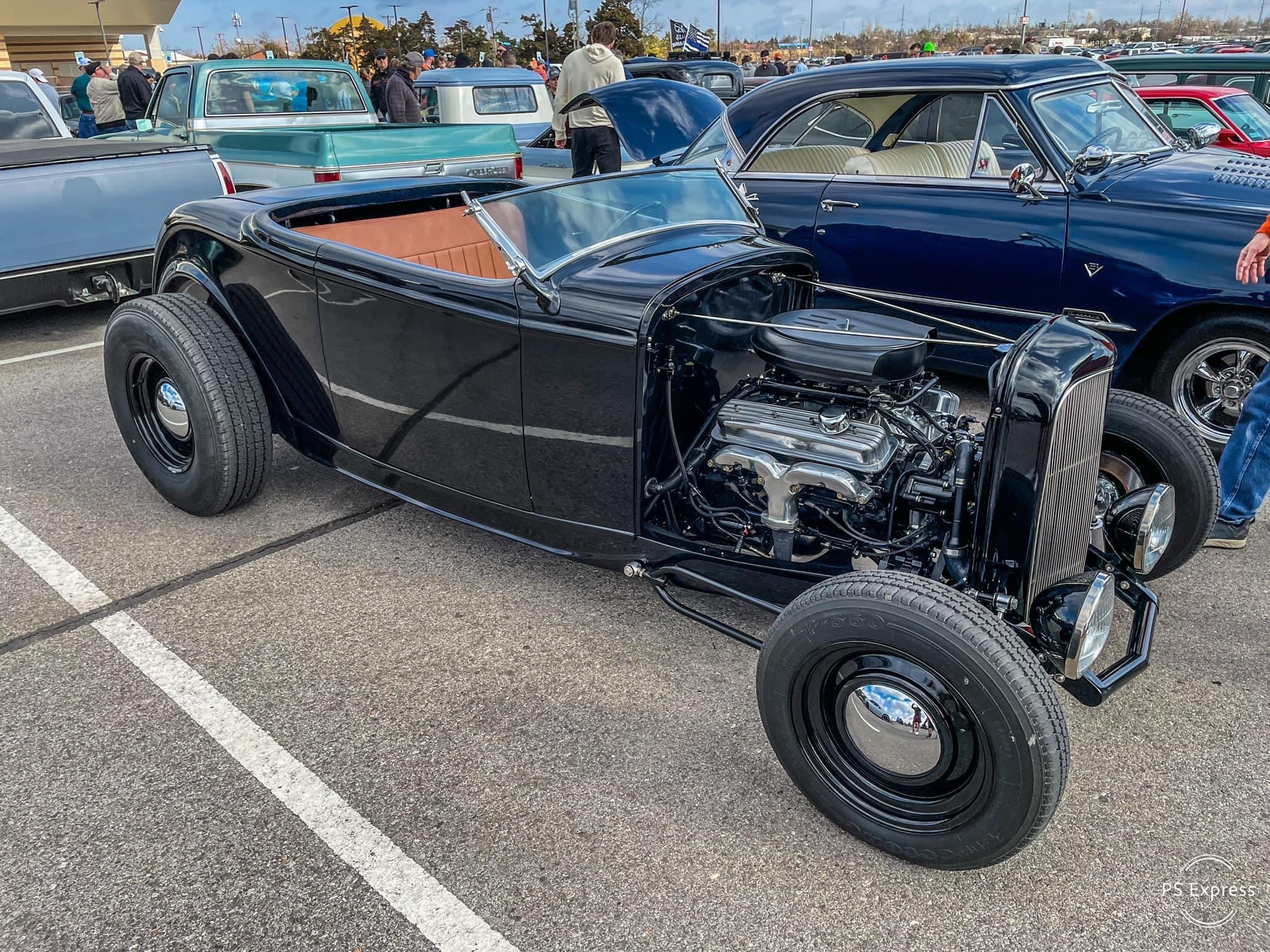
1932 Ford Roadster

Most newly built hot rods use fiberglass or more expensive, newly minted, steel bodies. The classic 1932 Ford lines are closely reproduced with new bodies. Because the 1932 Ford is extremely popular with hot rodders, unmodified versions are becoming rare. Although distinctly different in appearance, 1933 and '34 Fords are also popular starting points for hot rod construction, and are also available as reproductions.

==== Gallery ====
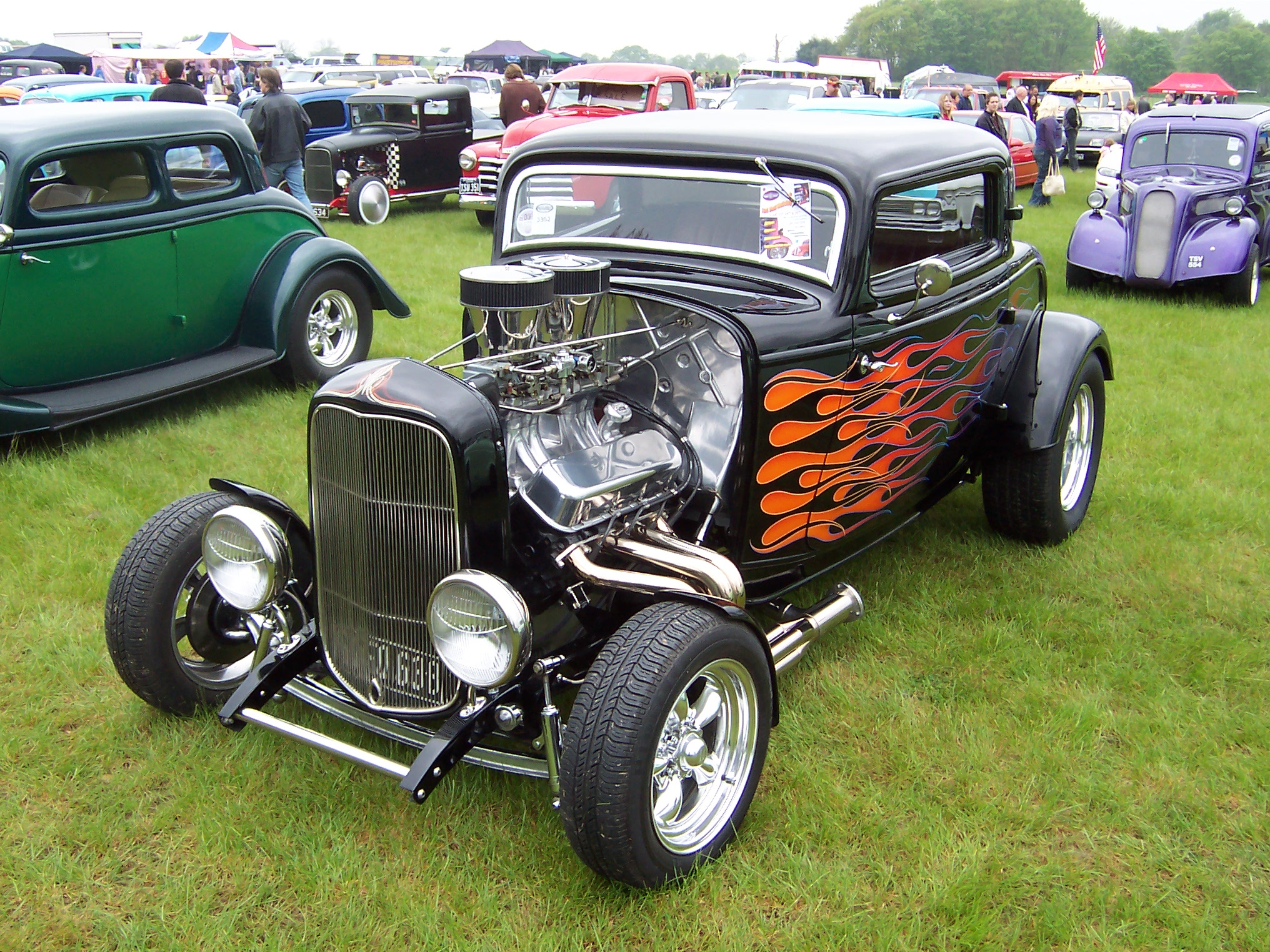
Hiboy Deuce, with chopped top, drag headers, and tunnel ram intake manifold (with dual quad carburetors), and aftermarket dropped axle and disc brakes, based on 1932 Model 18 or B three-window coupe

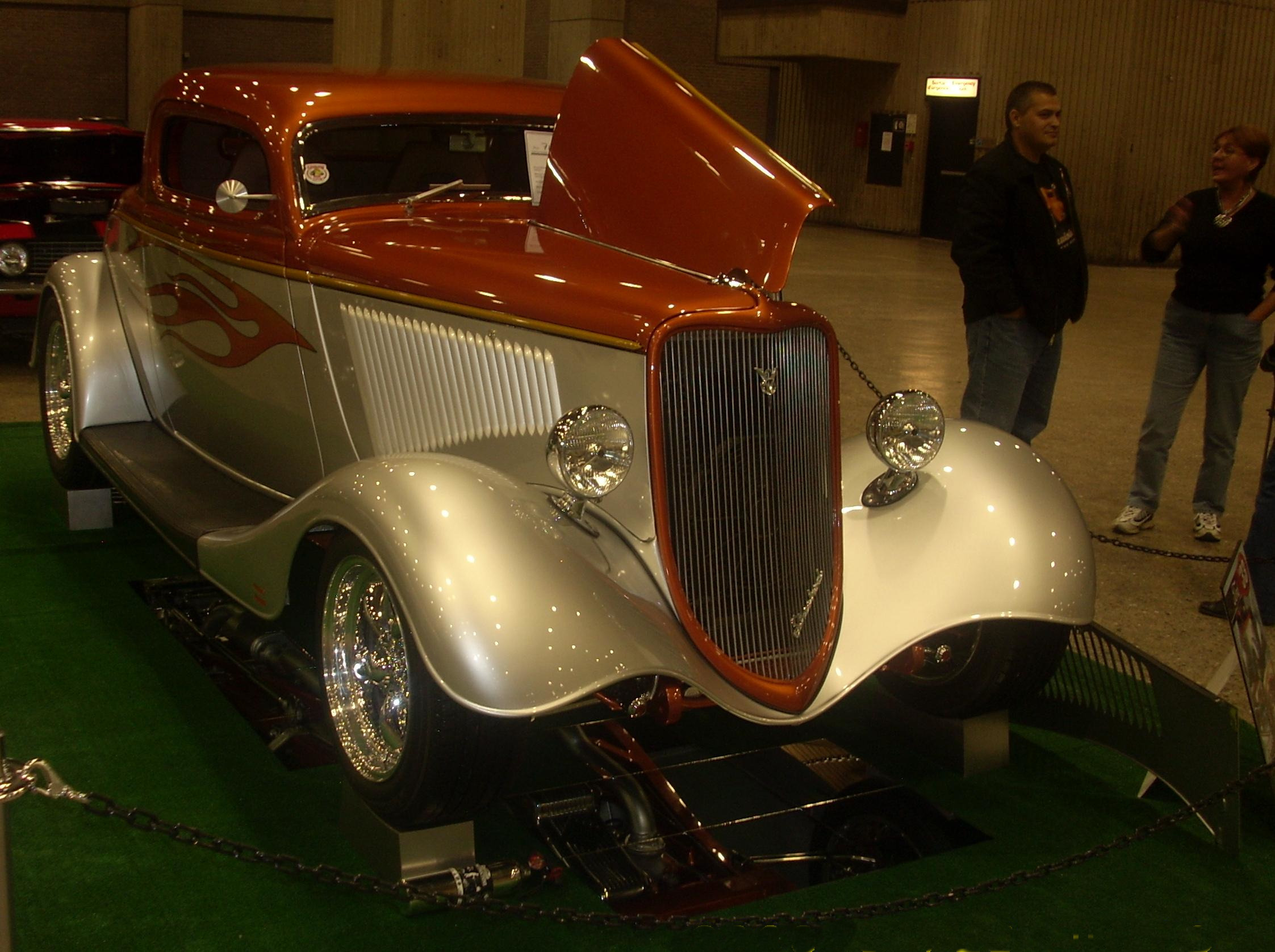
Street rod with chopped top, based on 1933 Model 40 or B three window coupe

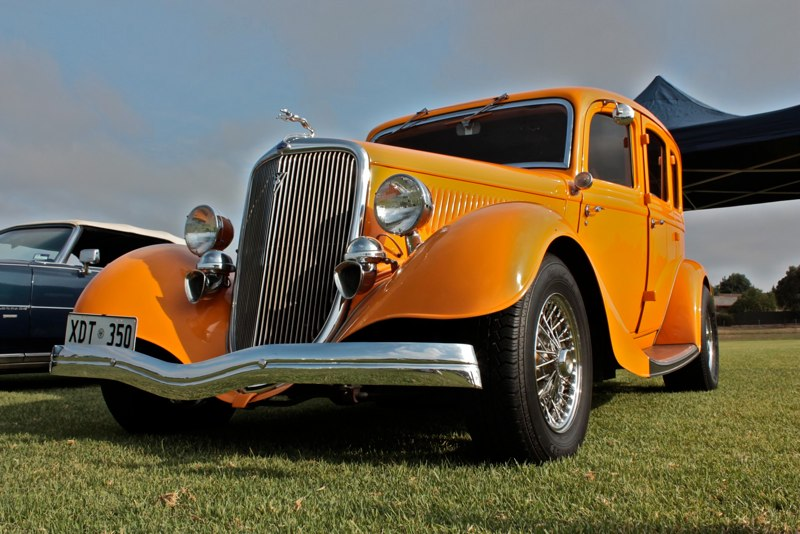
Somewhat milder tuned street rod without chopped top, based on 1934 Model 40B or B Fordor, claimed a Deluxe. The usual mixing parts in this genre avoids clear identification

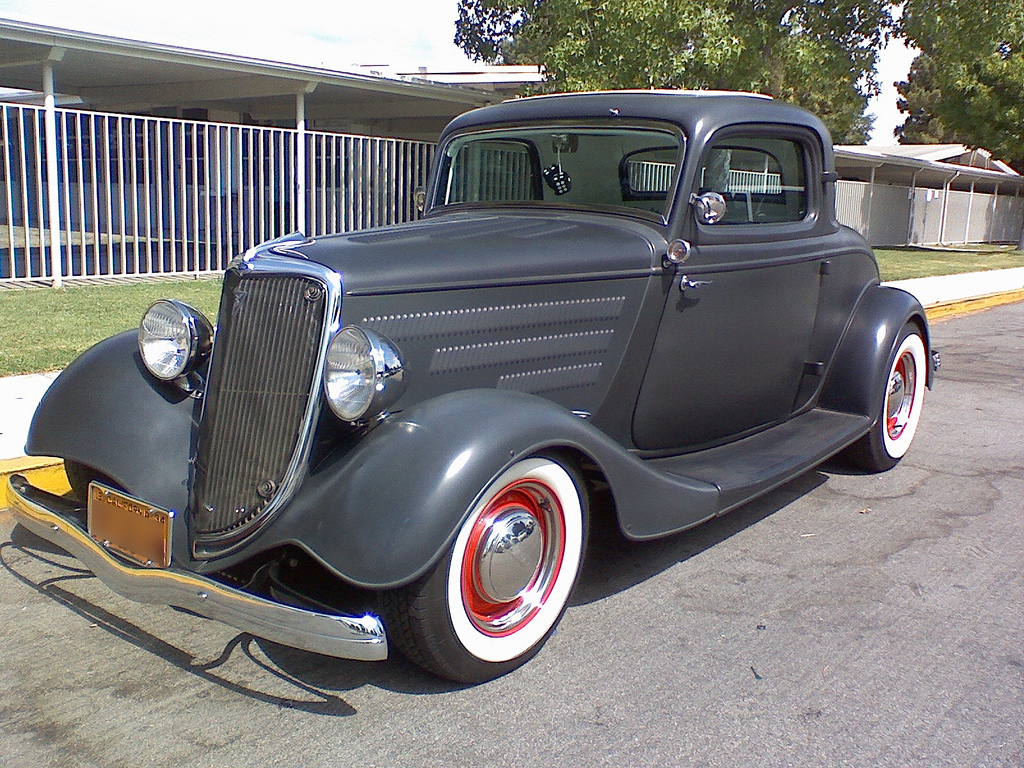
1934 Model 40B or B three window coupe, built in the 1950s hot rod tradition with 1930s style steel wheels and rows of hood louvres

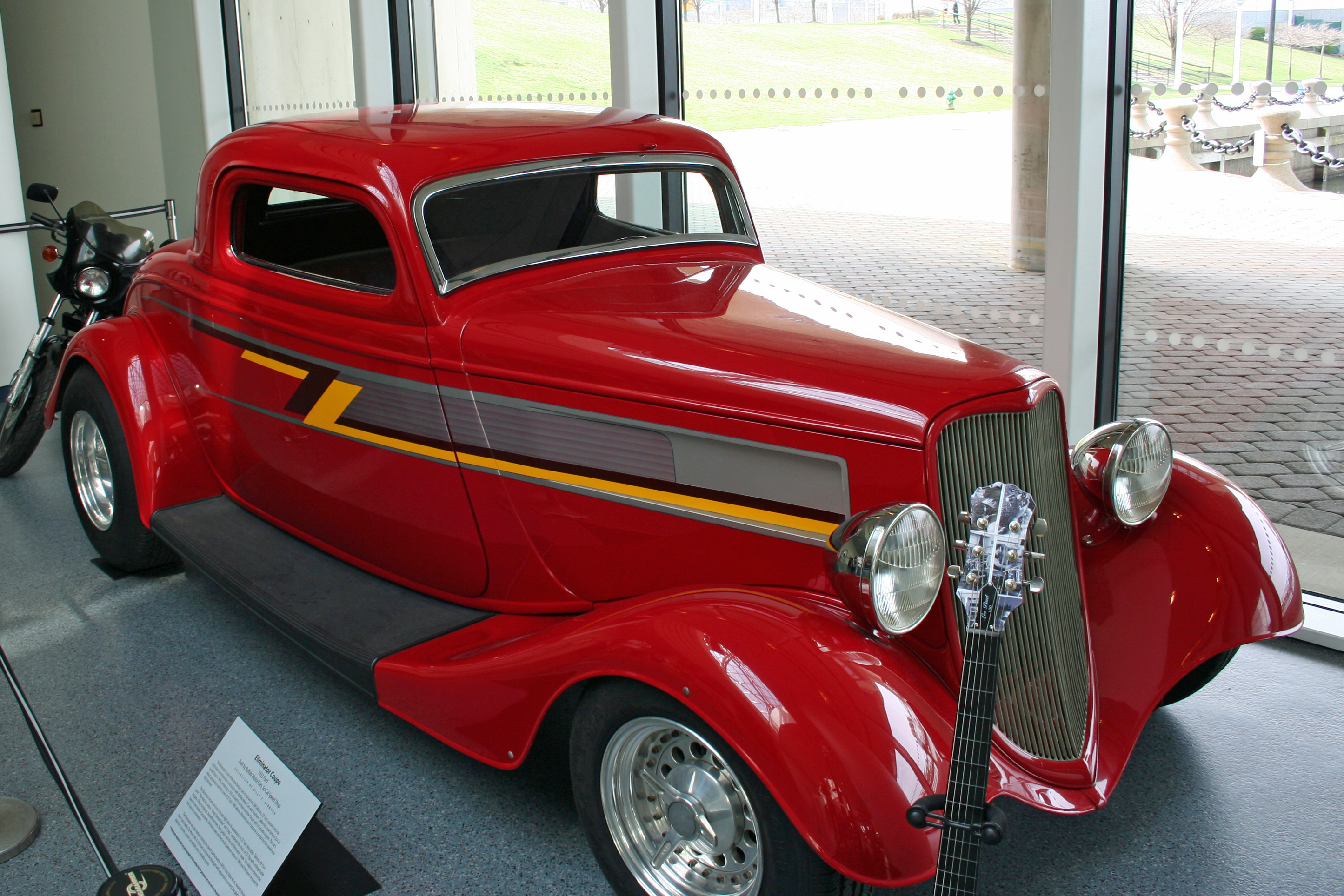
"Eliminator" coupe, based on a 1933 Ford and built for ZZ Top guitarist Billy Gibbons

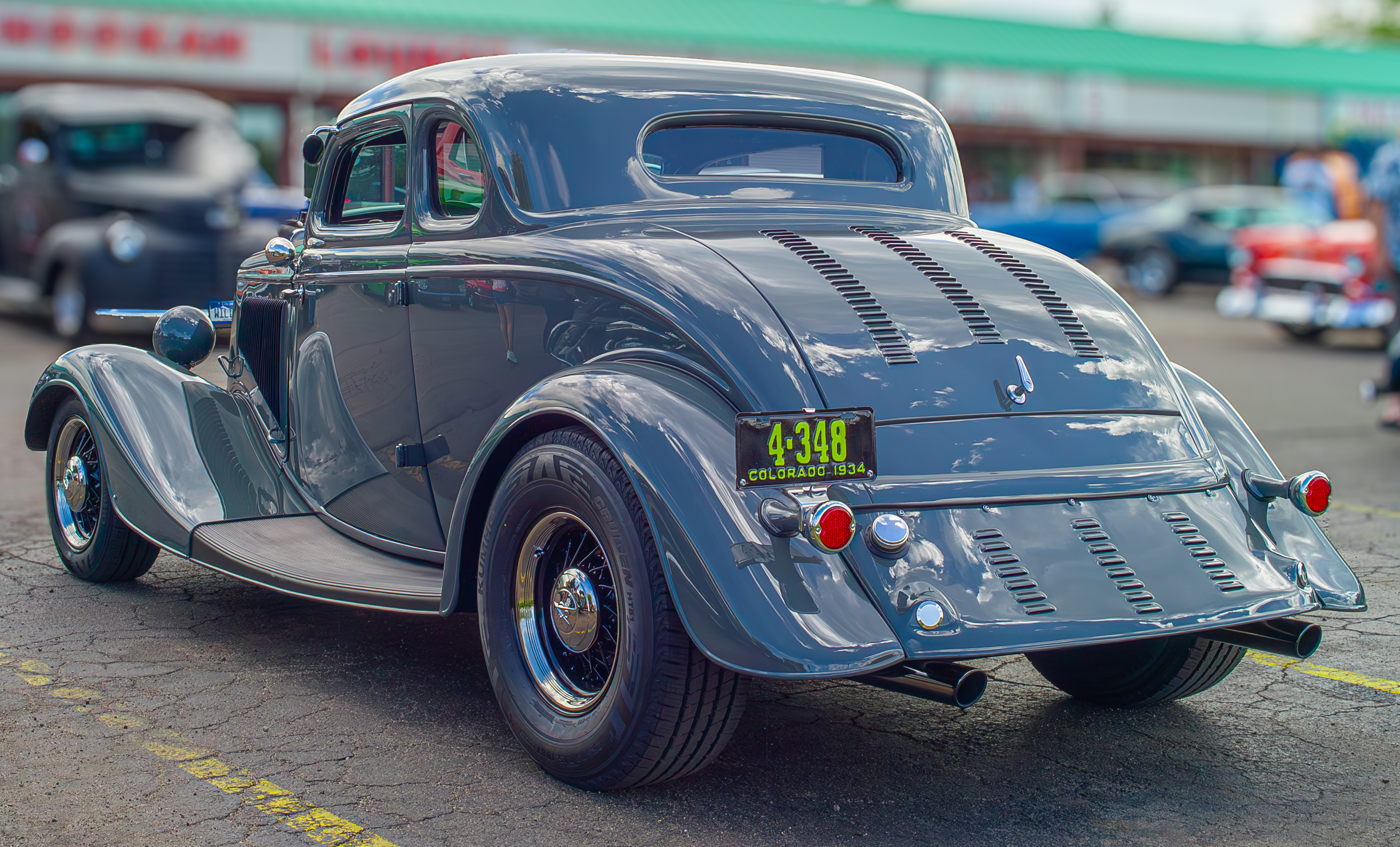
1934 Ford 5 Window Custom

== Production ==
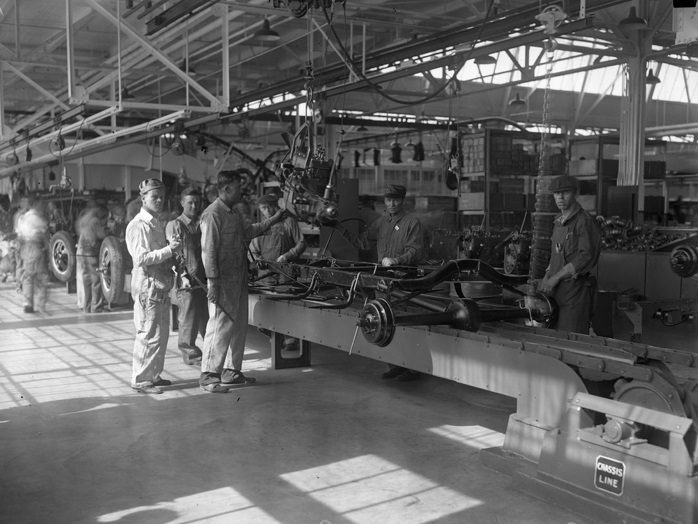
Model A chassis assembly, Ford Long Beach Assembly, April 21, 1930

There were no specific plants for the Model B. It rolled side by side with the V-8 off the line. In 1932, Ford Motor Company had 32 plants in the US, one in Canada, seven in Europe (one for Fordson tractor production only), four in Central and South America, and one each in Turkey, Japan and Australia. Vehicles were manufactured at the Ford River Rouge Plant, then sent to the various assembly locations in "knock-down kits" by railroad, where they were locally assembled and sold.

=== United States ===
- Atlanta (Georgia)
- Buffalo (New York)
- Charlotte (North Carolina)
- Chester (Pennsylvania)
- Chicago (Illinois)
- Cincinnati (Ohio)
- Cleveland (Ohio)
- Columbus (Ohio)
- Dearborn (Michigan)
- Denver (Colorado)
- Des Moines (Iowa)
- Edgewater (New Jersey)
- Houston (Texas)
- Indianapolis (Indiana)
- Jacksonville (Florida)
- Kansas City (Missouri)
- Long Beach (California)
- Louisville (Kentucky)
- Memphis (Tennessee)
- Milwaukee (Wisconsin)
- New Orleans (Louisiana)
- Norfolk (Virginia)
- Oklahoma City (Oklahoma)
- Omaha (Nebraska)
- Pittsburgh (Pennsylvania)
- Portland (Oregon)
- Richmond (California)
- St. Louis (Missouri)
- Seattle (Washington)
- Somerville (Massachusetts)
- St. Paul (Minnesota)

=== Canada ===
- Toronto (Ontario)
- Winnipeg (Manitoba)

=== Europe ===
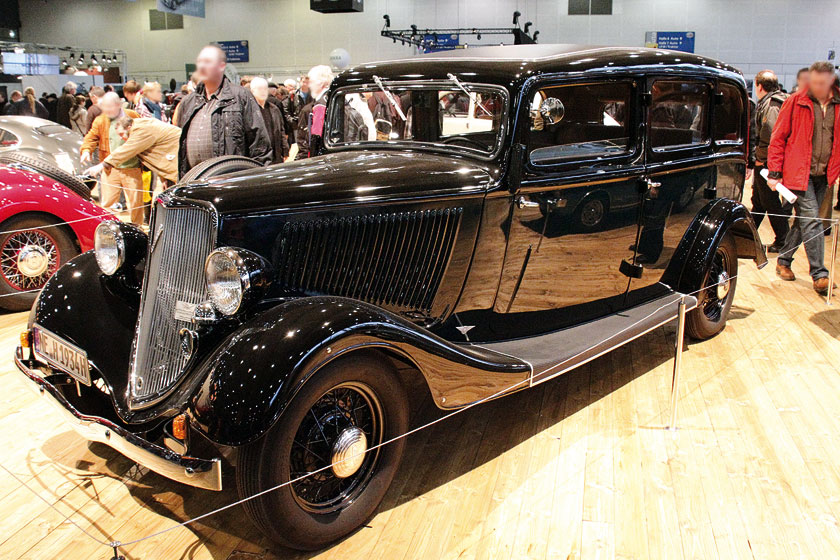
German built Ford Rheinland sedan with formal coachwork by Hebmüller (1934)

- Amsterdam (Netherlands)
- Antwerp (Belgium)
- Asnières-sur-Seine (France)
- Barcelona (Spain)
- Cologne (Germany)
- Copenhagen (Denmark)
- Dagenham (United Kingdom)
- Gorky (Soviet Union)

Like the previous GAZ A (Ford A based), a heavily modified version of the 1934 Ford Model B 40A was also produced by GAZ in Gorky as the M1 model. Available only to high-ranking officials, the military, and various institutions, it served as the basis for the BA-20 military vehicle. In Germany a four-cylinder variation of the Model B with a somewhat more streamlined back end was produced called the Rheinland. The Ford V8 was also made by Ford in Britain in the 1930s. It was conservatively re-styled and relaunched as the post-war Ford Pilot which came with two V8 engine options.

=== Mexico, Central and South America ===
- Buenos Aires (Argentina)
- Mexico City (Mexico)
- Santiago (Chile)
- São Bernardo do Campo (Brazil)

=== Asia and Oceania ===
- Istanbul (Turkey)
- Yokohama (Japan)
- Shanghai (China)
- Geelong (Australia)

== Model BB trucks ==
As with the previous model A, there were heavier commercial vehicles. They were available with either the venerable four or the more powerful V-8. The four cylinder truck got the designation "BB", following a practice started with the "TT" and "AA" trucks.

The BB had longer wheelbases of 131.5 or 157 in. (3340 or 3988 mm), a reinforced frame, heavy duty transmissions and axles, and bigger wheels. Wire wheels were standard on the light duty cars, the heavier got steel wheels (some of them dual on the rear axle). There was a separate catalogue offering popular body styles, rolling chassis or chassis and cab. Many local coachbuilders offered their coachwork to customers in need of more specific solutions. During the Depression, also ambulances, hearses, or fire trucks found their way to budget-minded communities and organizations.

Other than with the Model B automobiles, BB designated four as well as eight cylinder trucks. V-8 was strictly an option, even for heavy trucks. The bulk of these vehicles came with four cylinder engines.

These trucks are easily mistaken for B or V-8 commercial cars built on the passenger car chassis. Sedan deliveries, pickups, and station wagons were the most notable of these. They had elongated bodies and stiffer springs, and were generally shown in the commercial car catalogue, even if the wagon was the most expensive body style available on the passenger car chassis.

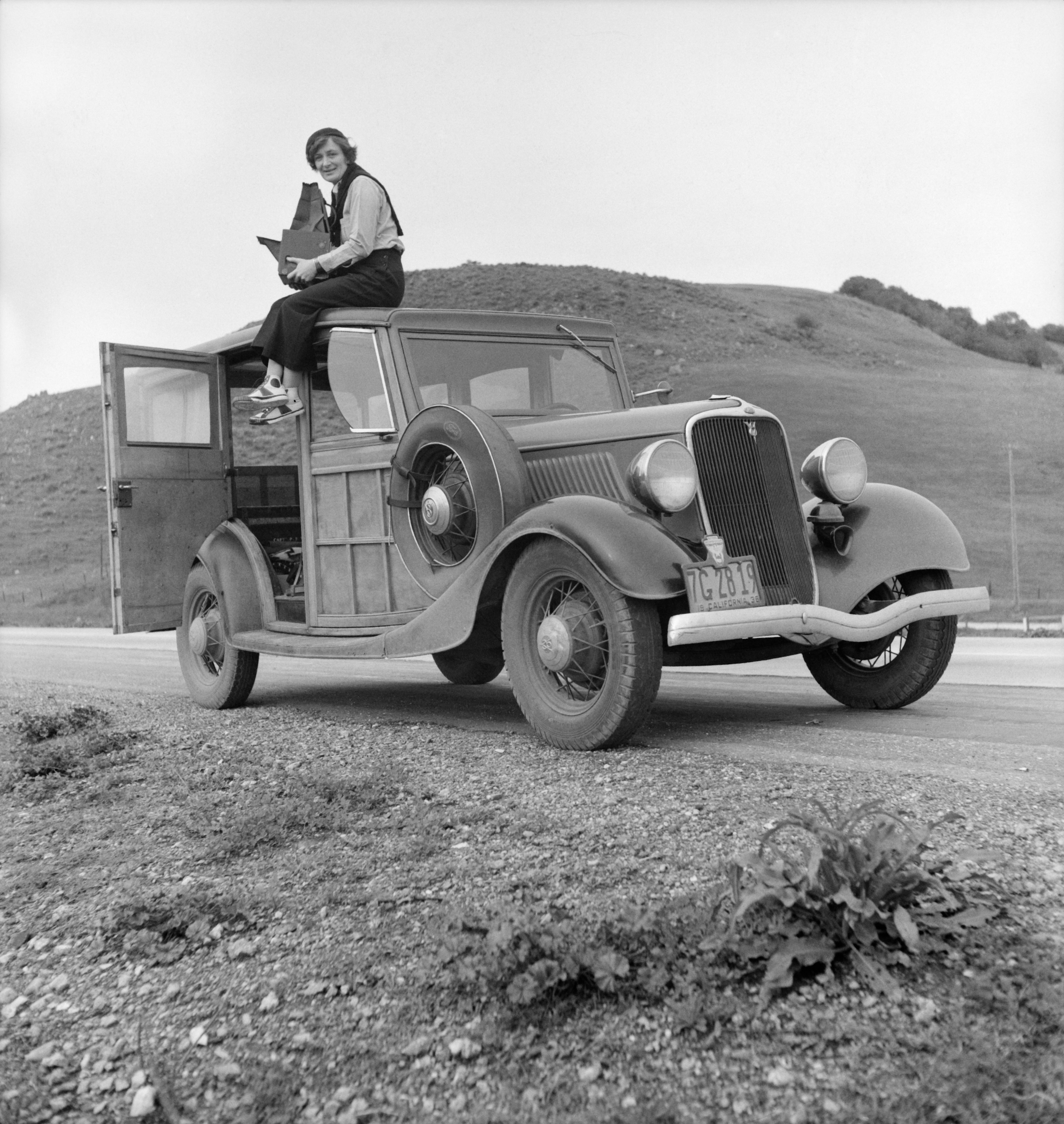
Dorothea Lange on a 1933 Model 40 (V-8) station wagon. The B is similar; the only outside differences are lack of the V-8 emblem on grille and hub caps. Considered a commercial car, it came in standard guise only.

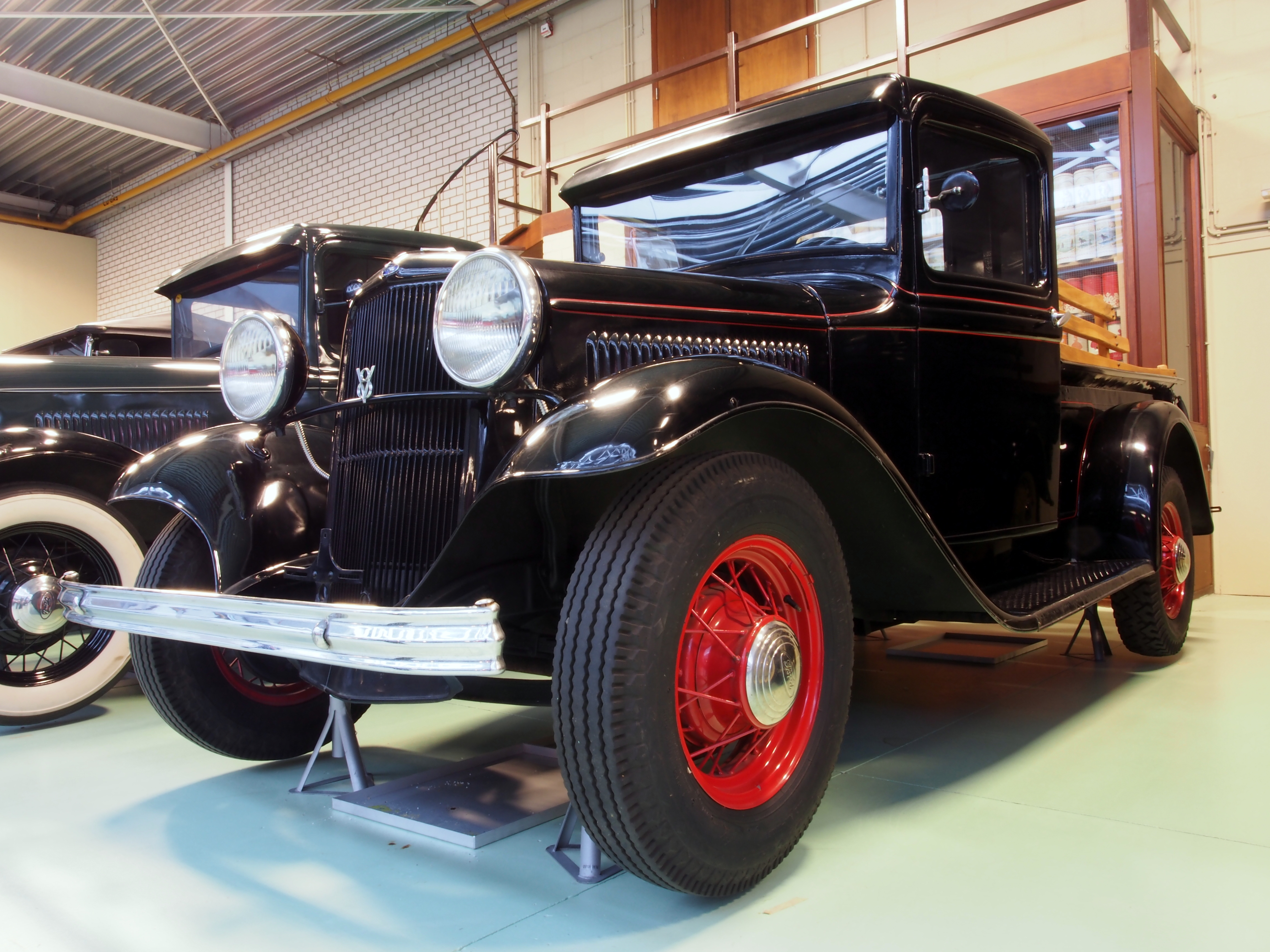
1933 Ford Model 46 (V-8) half ton pick up truck (1933). The BB is similar; the only outside difference is lack of the V-8 emblem on the headlamp support bar.

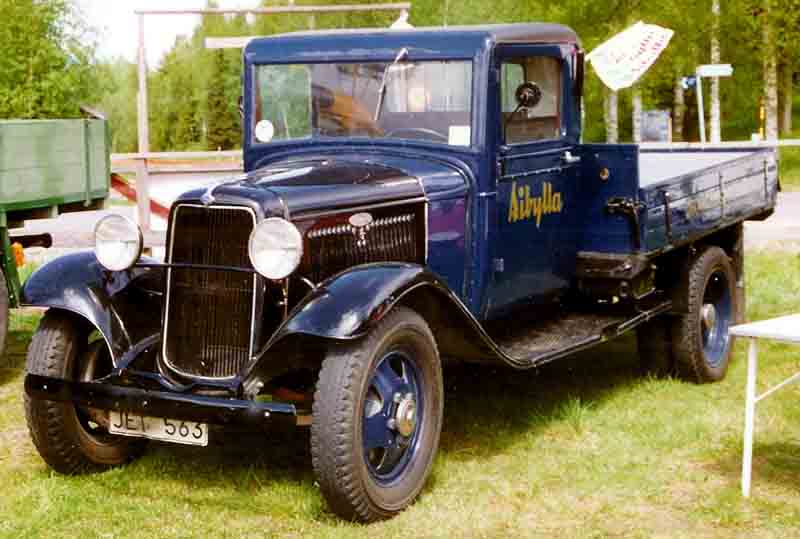
1934 Ford Model BB pick up truck.
