= 14A =

14A may refer to:

- Fourteenth Amendment to the United States Constitution
- New York State Route 14A
- Delaware Route 14A
- Volkswagen Type 14A (Hebmüller Cabriolet), a convertible version of the Volkswagen Beetle
- 14A, part of Connecticut Route 14
- 14A, a Canadian motion picture rating outside Quebec
