= Volkswagen Type 18A =

1949 German police convertible

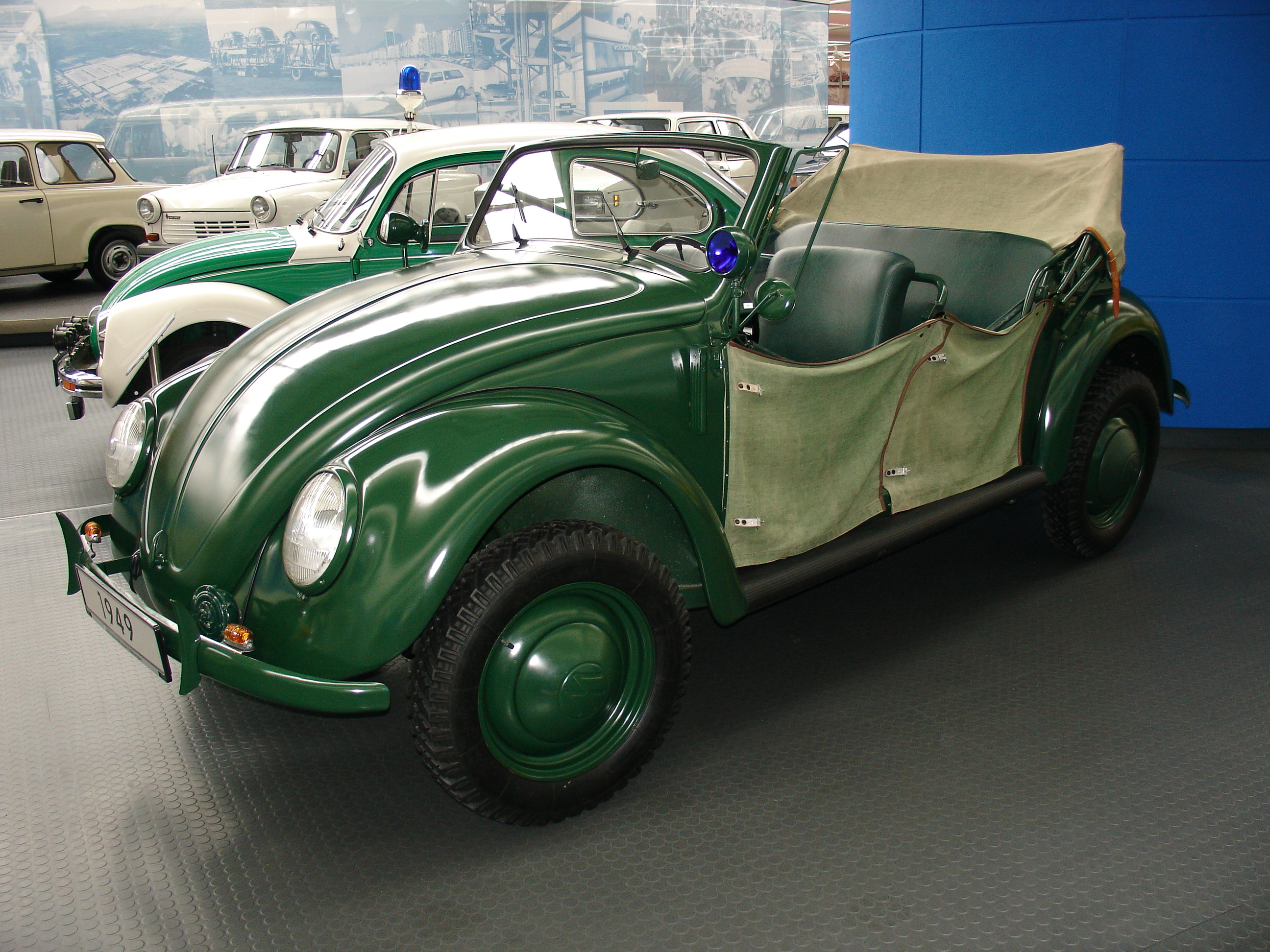
Volkswagen Type 18A

The Volkswagen Type 18A is a limited production variant of the Volkswagen Type 1 made for the German police that started production in 1949. In German it was called "Polizei Cabriolet" or Gendarmerier. It was also used by East Berlin's fire department. In total 482 were made, 203 by Karosserie Austro-Tatra. The lack of doors made it easy to get in or out of the car, but made it uncomfortable during the winter. The floorpan was strengthened, but the engine was a stock Type 1 engine producing 25 hp (19 kW), with a top speed of 100 km/h (62 mph). The brakes were mechanical.

The car was initially made by Hebmüller, but in 1950 production was moved to Karmann. Later a version with doors (15A M47) was also produced. During the late 1940s, four different types of Polizei Cabriolet were made, based on either Type 1 sedans or VW running gear. by Karmann, Hebmüller (which had a cabriolet top and mostly used four cloth doors), Papler (based in Köln, which differed in having four steel doors; only two are known to survive), and Austro-Tatra (which also used steel doors, and like the Hebmüller had a cabriolet top).
