= Austro-Tatra =

The Austro-Tatra was a car made by Austro-Tatra-Werke, Vienna, from 1934 to 1948.

After World War I and the subdivision of the Austro-Hungarian Empire, the administration, (headquartered in Vienna) and factory (located in Nesselsdorf (Koprivnice), Czechoslovakia), of the Nesselsdorf, later Tatra, company, were divided by a new frontier and border. The newly founded company Austro-Tatra started to assemble original Tatra cars in their works at Simmering, near Vienna, and after 1934, built the Tatra 57 under license. World War II interrupted production in 1939, but production was taken up again on a limited scale from 1946 to 1948.

In 1948/49, Austro-Tatra built a handful of bodies for Porsche's new 356 that were at the time produced in the Austrian village of Gmünd in Carinthia. Between January 1950 and March 1951, Karosserie Austro-Tatra built 203 four-door cabriolets on the Type 1 platform, with fixed folding top, known as Gendarmiers, for police and fire under VW's Type 18A identifier.

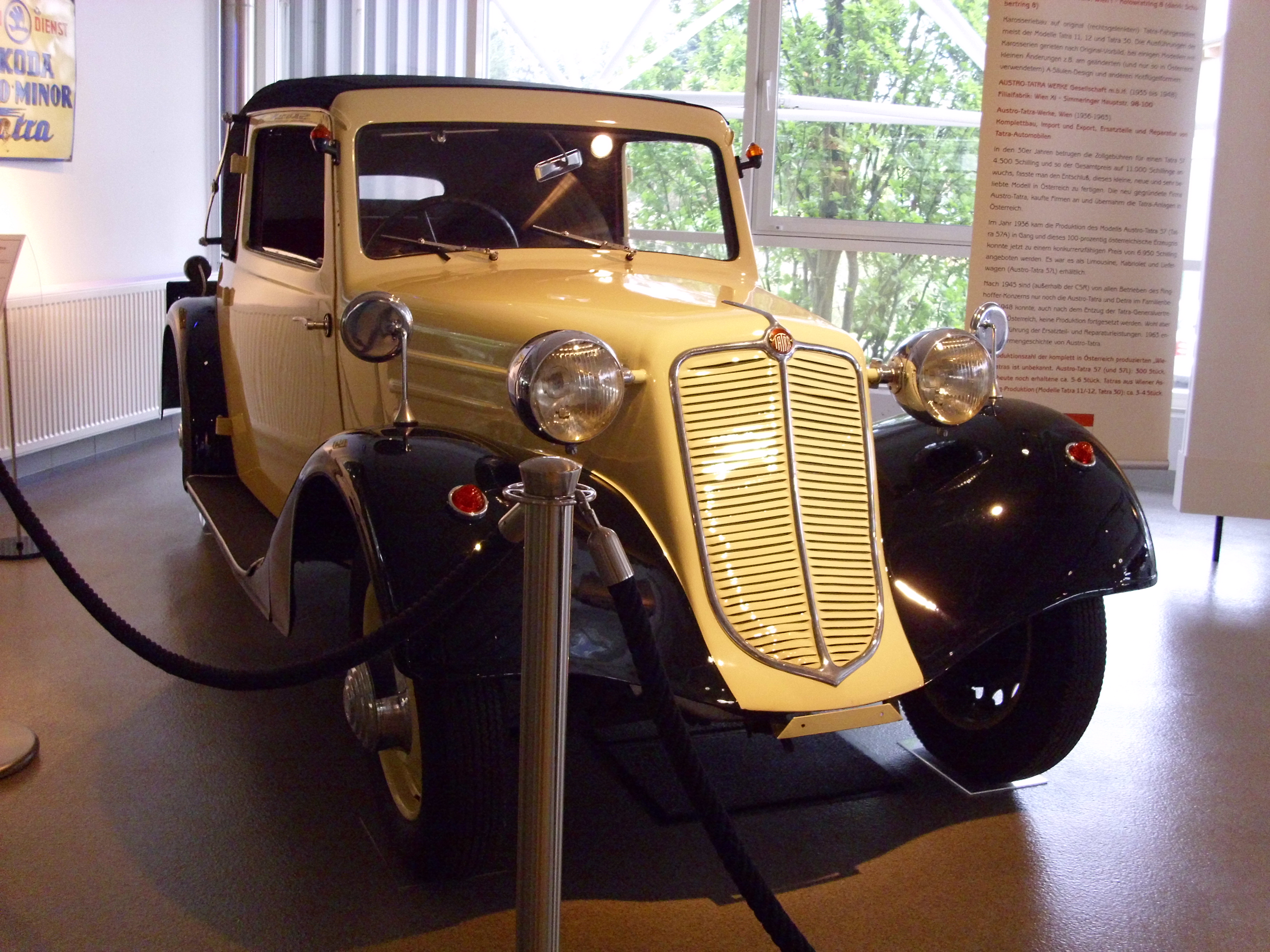
Austro-Tatra 57A (1938)

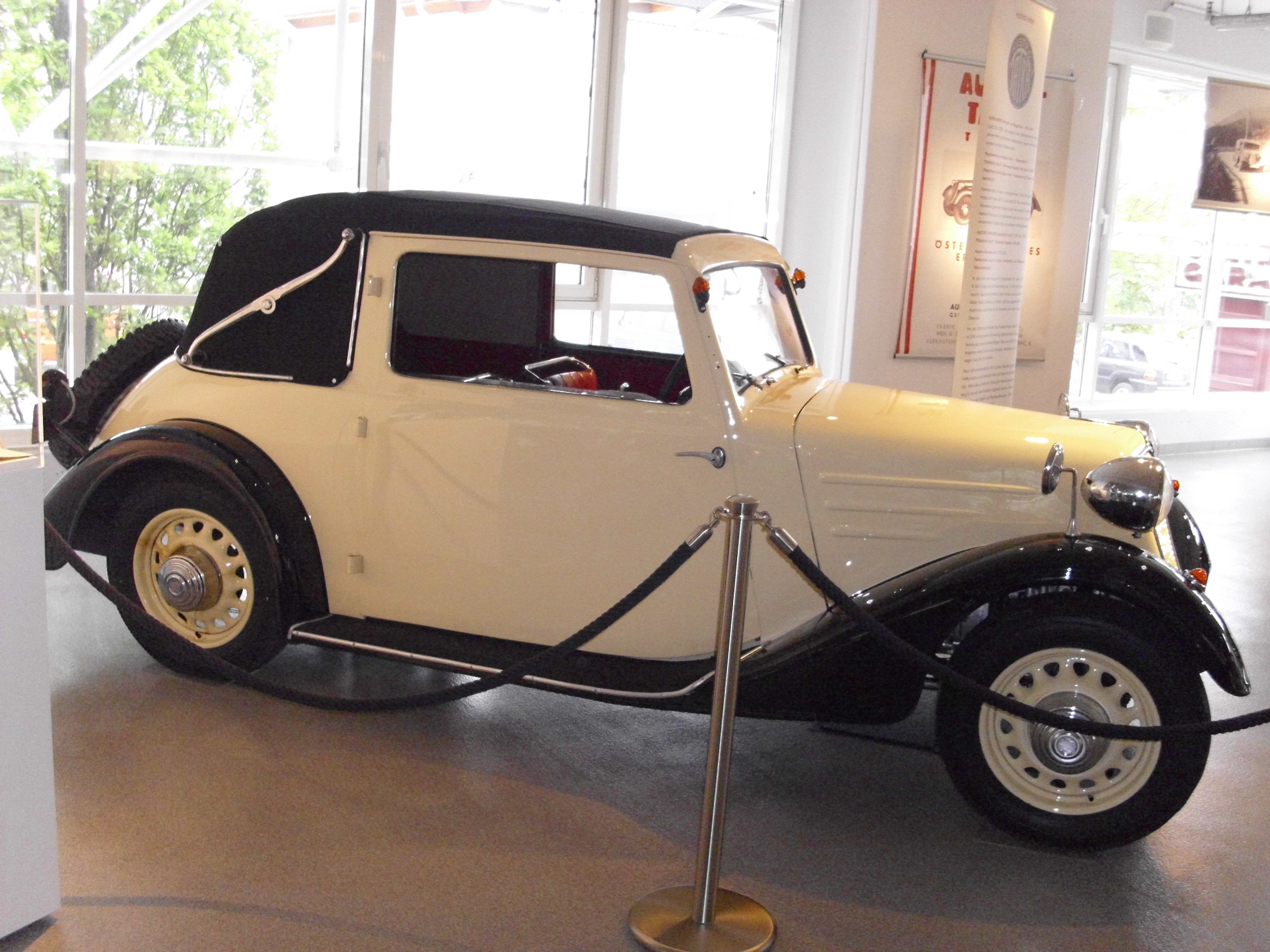

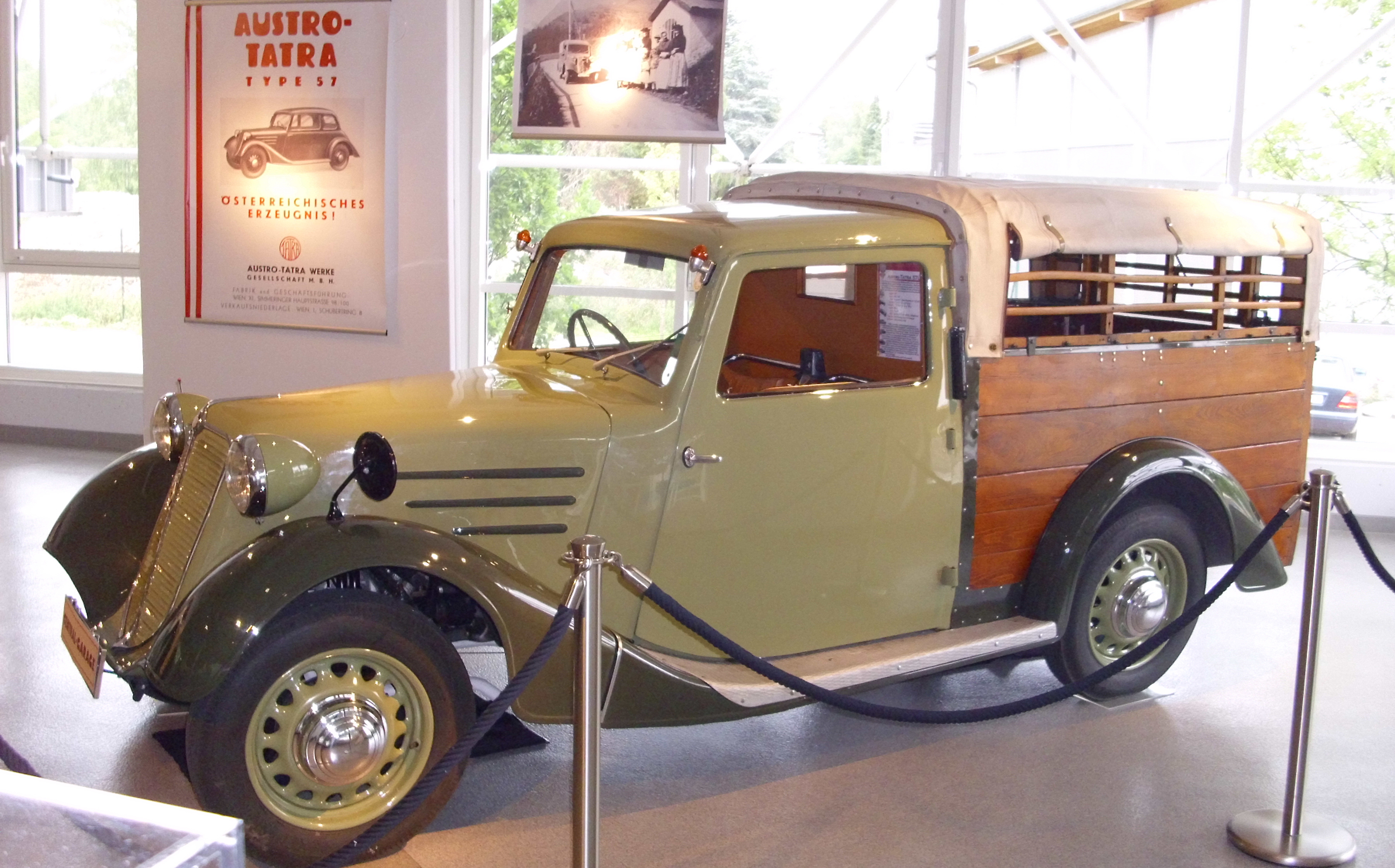
The model 57 L (Lieferwagen or delivery car) was unique to Austro-Tatra
