= Hebmüller =

German vehicle manufacturing company

Hebmüller Sons
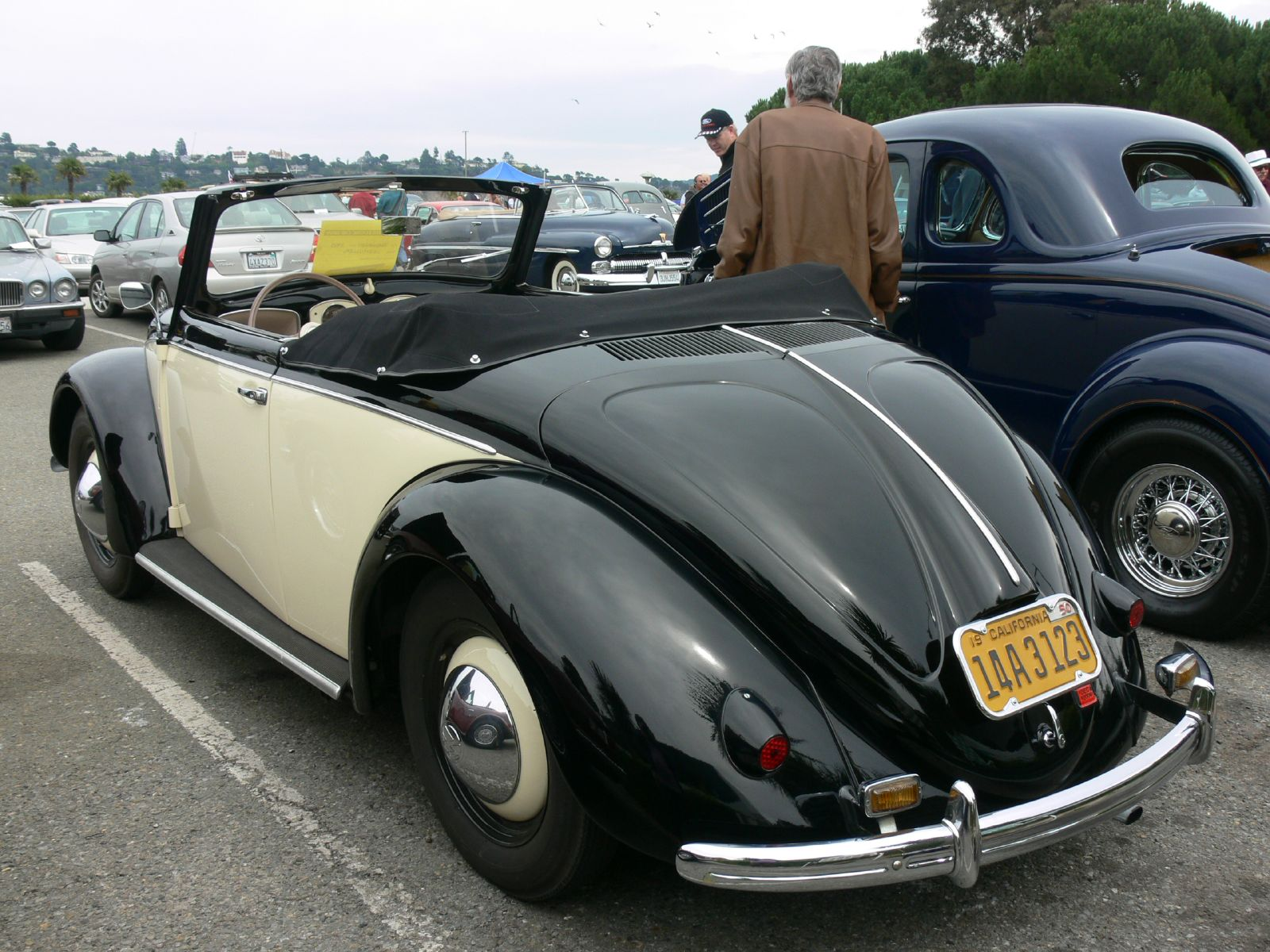
- 1950 Hebmüller cabriolet
- Company type: Private company
- Industry: Automotive
- Founded: 1889, Wuppertal, Germany
- Founder: Joseph Hebmüller
- Defunct: 1952
- Fate: Bankruptcy in 1952
- Number of locations: One
- Products: Volkswagen Type 14A, Opel Kapitan & Admiral, and many other manufacturers like Ford and Mercedes

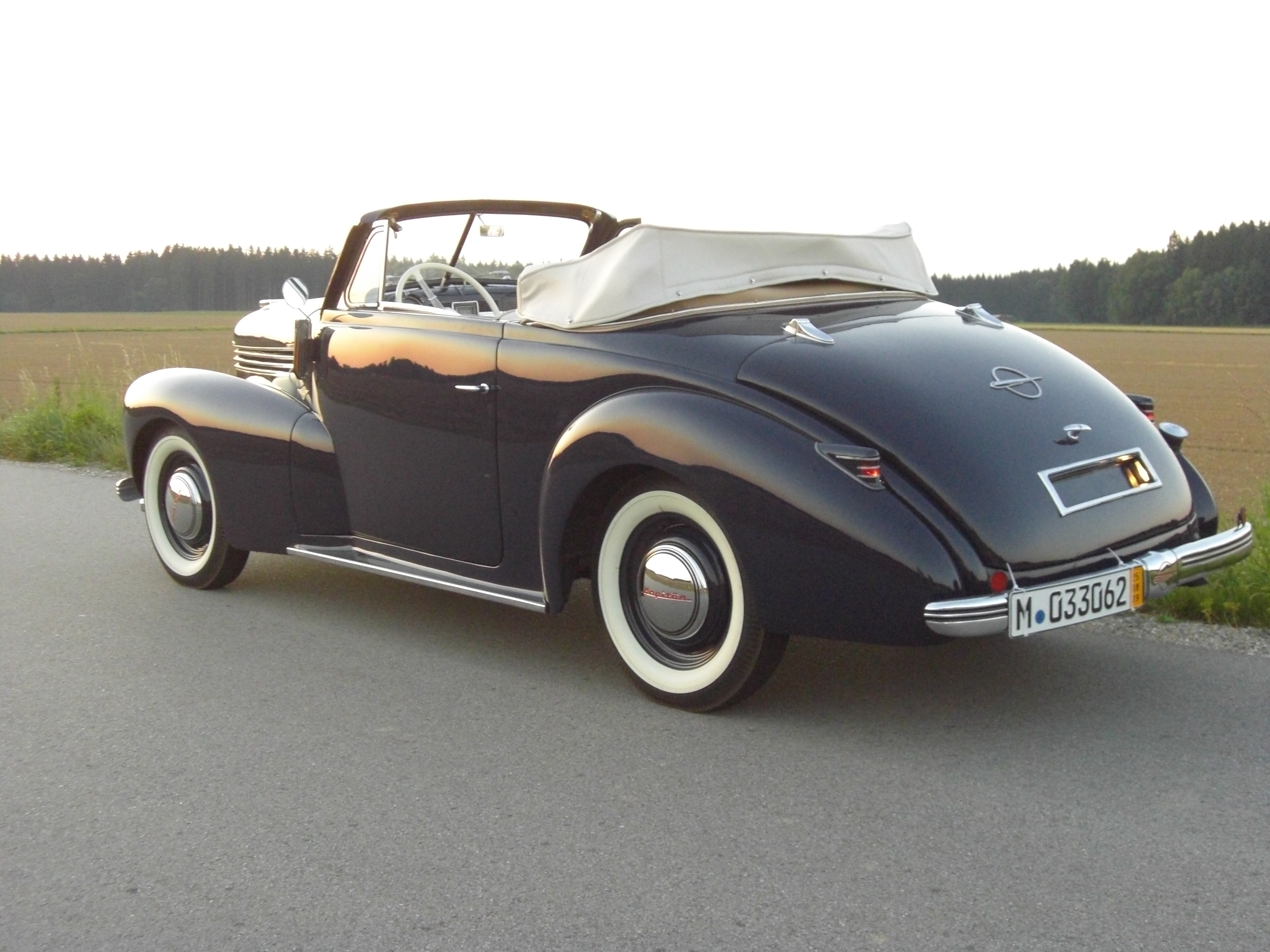
Opel Kapitan Hebmüller from 1940; just 2 examples survive

Hebmüller Sons (Karosseriewerke Joseph Hebmüller Söhne) was a coachbuilder founded in 1889 by Joseph Hebmüller in the town of Wuppertal in Germany.

== History ==
Hebmüller initially constructed horsedrawn carriages, but after the death of its founder in 1919 his sons started building bodies for automobiles.

After World War II, the company received an order from the British Army to build 15 Humber based cabriolets.

The company's best known model is perhaps a 2+2 convertible based on the Volkswagen Type 1 platform - known as Volkswagen Type 14A or "Hebmüller Cabriolet". It also built a number of four-door cabriolets on the Type 1 platform (Type 18A), with canvas doors.

By the end of the 1940s, Hebmüller's economic situation was deteriorating. However, it was widely reported that Volkswagen ordered 2,000 vehicles, with production starting in June 1949. A massive fire struck its Wülfrath factory on 23 July 1949, which, due to a water shortage, could not be extinguished before almost the entire facility was destroyed. Although the factory was rapidly rebuilt, and over 350 more cars were produced in 1949 alone, the company never recovered from the destruction. Only 696 cabriolets were completed before the company went bankrupt in May 1952, with Karmann of Osnabrück (which was already producing a four-seater Type 1 cabriolet to its own design) producing a final batch.

The Ford Motor Company subsequently purchased the former Hebmüller factory.

== In popular culture ==
- The cover of Volume 13 of the Dragon Ball manga (Volume 29 of the original Japanese) features Gohan and Piccolo driving a Volkswagen Type 14A.
