= Volkswagen Type 14A (Hebmüller Cabriolet) =

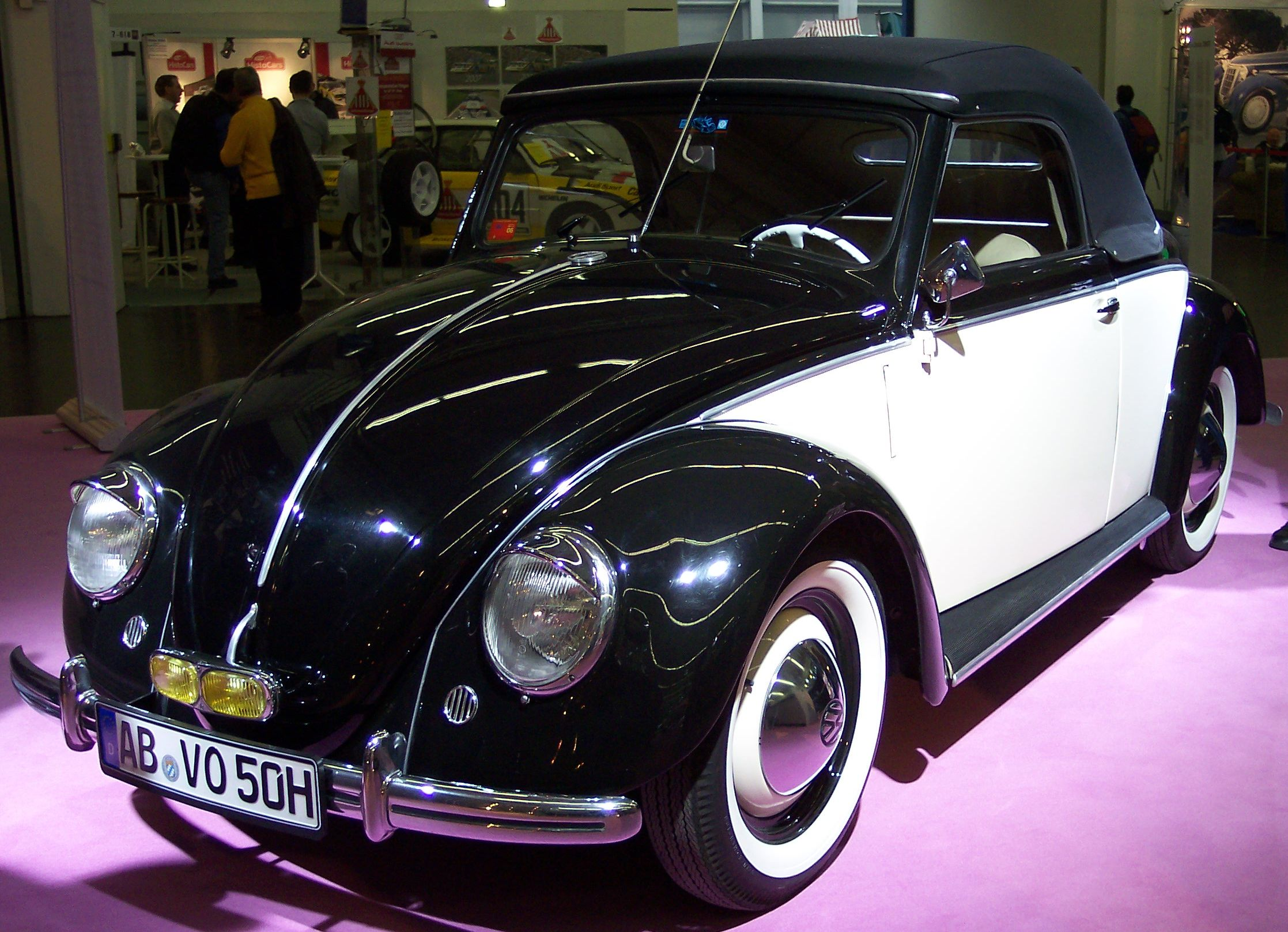

Overview
- Manufacturer: Hebmüller and Sohn for Volkswagen
- Also called: Hebmüller Cabriolet
- Production: June 1949–1953
- Assembly: Germany: Wuppertal (1949–1951); Germany: Wülfrath (1949–1951); Germany: Osnabrück (1952–1953)
- Designer: Charles Radcliffye, Joseph Hebmüller II

Body and chassis
- Body style: 2+2 seater Cabriolet
- Layout: Longitudinal rear engine
- Related: Volkswagen Beetle

Powertrain
- Engine: 19 kW Volkswagen air-cooled engine

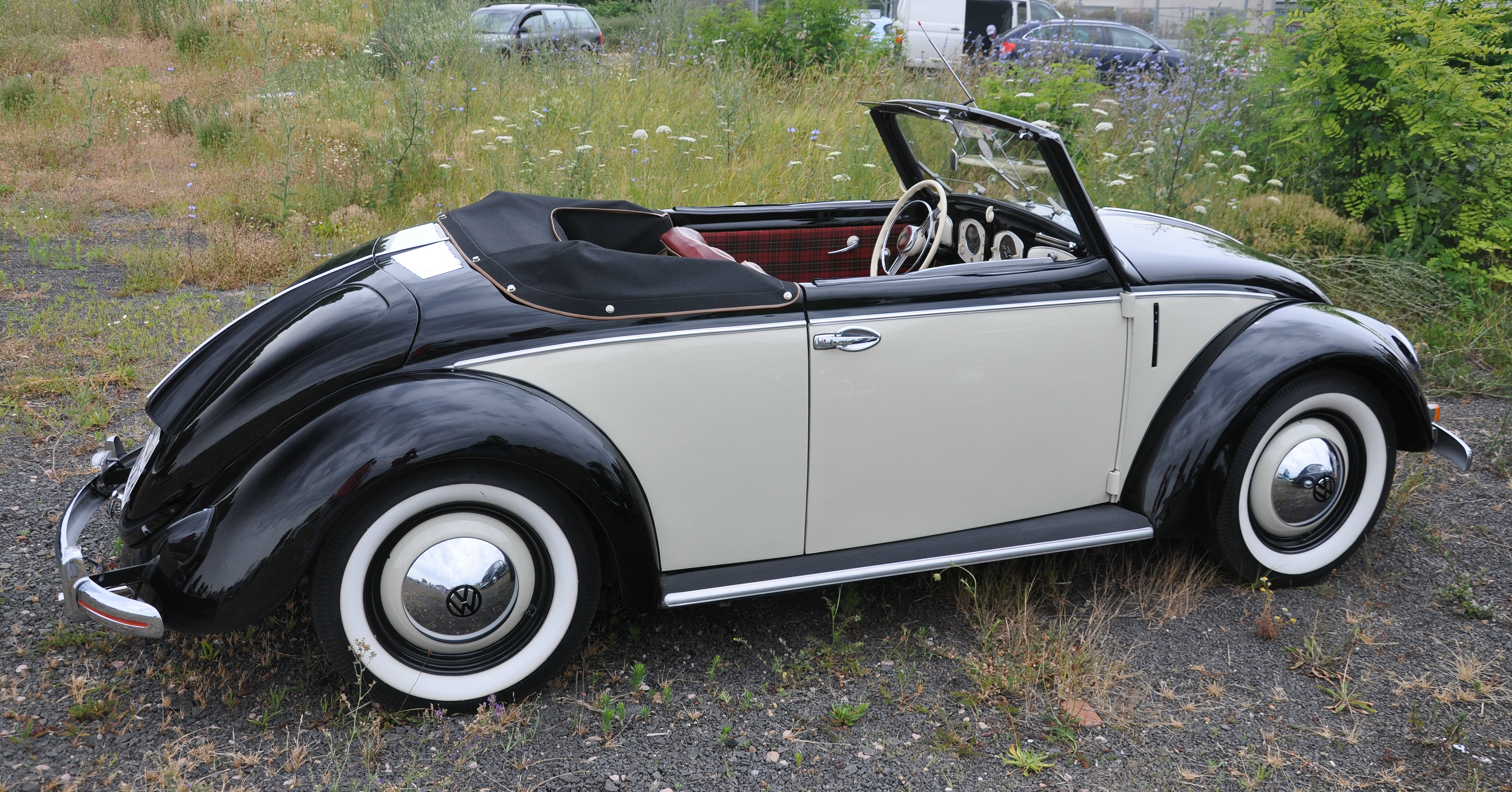
When folded down the convertible top took up much of the rear seating area

The Volkswagen Type 14A (commonly known as the Hebmüller Cabriolet) is a convertible Volkswagen Type 1 produced by German coachbuilder Hebmüller and Sohn after the Second World War.

With the German economy destroyed, and severe limits on industrial production imposed by the Allies' Morgenthau Plan, the Wuppertal-based firm, like most German companies of the time, lacked business. British Army Major Ivan Hirst of the Royal Electrical and Mechanical Engineers (REME) was running Volkswagen. After talks with Colonel Michael McEvoy about a sports car based Volkswagen Beetle, Ivan asked Ringel's experimental team to build the Colonel in charge of Volkswagen, Charles Radcliffye, a two-seat cabriolet.

The Radclyffe Cabriolet, as it is known in Volkswagen circles, obviously influenced Joseph Hebmüller II on his frequent trips to the Wolfsburg plant. The Type 14A took many elements of the Radclyffe Cabriolet his company would later build.

At the request of Volkswagen managing director Heinz Nordhoff, Hebmüller and Karmann would build cabriolets for Volkswagen, with as many Type 1 parts, such as chassis, engines, and body panels, as possible. Hebmüller was to build the 2+2 cabriolet, and Karmann the four-seat cabriolet. By contrast with the Karmann, the Heb was intended as a sporting model.

In April 1949, the Type 14A passed a 10,000 kilometres (6,214 mi) rough road test by Volkswagen engineers. Pleased with the results, Heinz Nordhoff ordered 2,000 production versions to be sold by Volkswagen through its agents.

Hebmüller started production in June 1949 at the Wuppertal and Wülfrath factories. Mechanically the Type 14A was the same as the Beetle saloon with mechanical brakes, and the Type 1's' 19-kilowatt (26 PS; 25 bhp) petrol engine. It also shared the Type 1's crank starting, and the cabriolet's cowl-mounted semaphore turn signals and its pushbutton Telefunken radio. The Heb differed in having the decklid and trunk lid being of a similar size and shape.

Retailing for 7,500 Deutsch Marks, the Hebmüller Cabriolet was available in a variety of colours. Options were black, red and white in single tone, and two-tone combinations black and red, black and ivory, black and yellow, and red and ivory were available, and for extra charge buyers could choose their own combination.

The Type 14A was sold and serviced through Volkswagen agencies on the German market, and through private importers in foreign markets.

A fire broke out on 23 July 1949 in the Wülfrath factory's paint department, and made its way to the production line. Hebmüller managed to continue production after the fire, but later became financially ruined in the early 1950s. Production of the Type 14A was moved to the Karmann factory in Osnabrück, Germany in 1952.

Production ended in 1953 with a total of 696 units produced, including 3 prototypes and 1 pre-production model. Around 100 are thought to survive.

Today a replica of the Type 14A is produced by the Brazilian convertible company Troca.
