= Latvija =

Latvija may refer to:

- The Latvian name for Latvia
- Latvija (automobile), a car brand of the former USSR car maker Riga Autobus Factory (RAF)
- Latvija (glider), on the List of gliders
