= International Automotive Design =

British automotive design company

- Type: Private
- Industry: Automotive design
- Founded: (1976)
- Founder: John Shute; Yvonne Shute

International Automotive Design (IAD UK Ltd) was a British design company, based in Worthing, West Sussex, England.

IAD UK Ltd was founded in 1976 by John and Yvonne Shute. Initially, work came in the form of design services for rail cars which then led to Automotive Body and Chassis Engineering. However, due to the increasing customers' requirements, it soon expanded to encompass everything from design/styling and engineering through to small-scale production. IAD UK Ltd had at its peak a large R&D facility in Worthing, West Sussex, UK, plus 5 overseas operations in the USA (Huntington Beach, California and Detroit, Michigan), France (5 facilities), Spain and Germany (3 facilities) along with liaison offices in Korea, Japan and Russia. The US, German and Spanish offices having their own styling studios. It was the world's largest R&D consultancy, and worked in automotive, commercial vehicles and aerospace. The company was in competition with Italdesign, Pininfarina, Bertone. By the early 1990s, the company employed over 1400 people. The majority of the projects completed by IAD were never made public, keeping the high level of security that John Shute believed was the key to customers allowing IAD to be considered for future projects.

The company was awarded the Queen's Award for Export and Industry many times and ultimately John was appointed an OBE (Order of the British Empire) by Queen Elizabeth II for his endeavors on behalf of the British Motor industry.IAD Worthing Herald Article

IAD designed and developed many concept cars as showcases including the IAD Alien, IAD Hunter, IAD Interstate, IAD Arrival, IAD Royale, IAD Mini MPV, IAD Venus and the IAD Magia.

They specialized in car prototyping and engineering design. Mayflower Corp. purchased IAD after it went into receivership in the early 1990s with the Engineering, Design groups and facilities sold to Daewoo Motors in 1993.

The Mazda MX5 (Miata) was one of the projects IAD was involved in, developing exterior and interior style for the vehicle in the UK/ US (California), as well as building prototypes locally prior to volume production in 1989. Mazda came to IAD to replicate the "true" British sports car invoking the MG's success of handling, and even directed the chassis team to copy the exhaust note of early MGBs.

One of the final projects undertaken by IAD in 1991 was the design and building of a limited production of replicas of the Pegaso Z-103 Spider. Only 11 of 60 units were completed and the project was cancelled by the Iveco, the new owners of the Pegaso Truck company. Another project that IAD was involved close to its demise was design development of the RAF M1 'Roksana' prototype minivan in 1991, which, however, did not go into mass production.

== Personnel ==
=== Board Members ===
- John Shute - Managing Director
- Yvonne Shute - Board Secretary
- Mike Hyatt - Director of Programs
- Mike Goldsmith - Director of Sales
- Peter Waters - Human Resources Director/ MD of IAD Consulting
- Trevor Lacey - Engineering Director
- Guy Hudson - IT Director
- Godfrey Harker - Finance Director
- J.Mason - Operations Director
- J.Singer -

=== Divisional Directors ===
- Jim Mason - International Operations
- Bill Livingstone - Spanish Operations
- Neil Brooker - Director Asia/Pacific Operations
- Bill Anthony - France Operations
- Alan Jackson - Studio Director
- Greg Greeson- German Operations
- Carl Meyers - US East Coast Operations

and others

=== Design Directors ===
- Eddie Pepall
- Trevor Fiore
- Alan Jackson

=== Designers ===
- Martin Longmore (Alien, Impact, Hunter)
- Marcus Hotblack (Alien, Impact, Hunter)
- Tony Pettman (Interstate, EuroTaxi)
- Michael Ani (Venus, Magia)
- Cindy Charwick
- Robin Austin
- Patrick Raymond
- Andrew Barber
- Chris Longmore
- Brian Osborn (Magia)
- Dave Cutcliffe
- Taewan Kim
- Bill Barranco (Royale)
- Chris Garfield
- Dave Ancona (Hunter)
- Jose Diaz de la Vega (Royale)
- Robin Lock
- Stuart Macey (Mini MPV)

.

== Projects ==
Some of the companies IAD worked for include:

- Asia Motors
- Audi
- Austin Rover
- BAE Systems
- Bentley/Rolls-Royce
- BMW
- British Airways
- Bova
- DAF
- Daihatsu
- Daewoo Motors
- Fiat/Alfa Romeo/Lancia
- Ferrari
- Ford
- GM
- Hino
- JCB
- Kia
- Land Rover
- Lincoln
- Logicar
- Lotus
- Mazda
- McLaren
- Pegaso
- Renault
- Riga Autobus Factory
- Saab
- Subaru
- Suzuki
- Tyrrell Racing
- Volvo
- Yamaha
- Yugo
