= SARB Start =

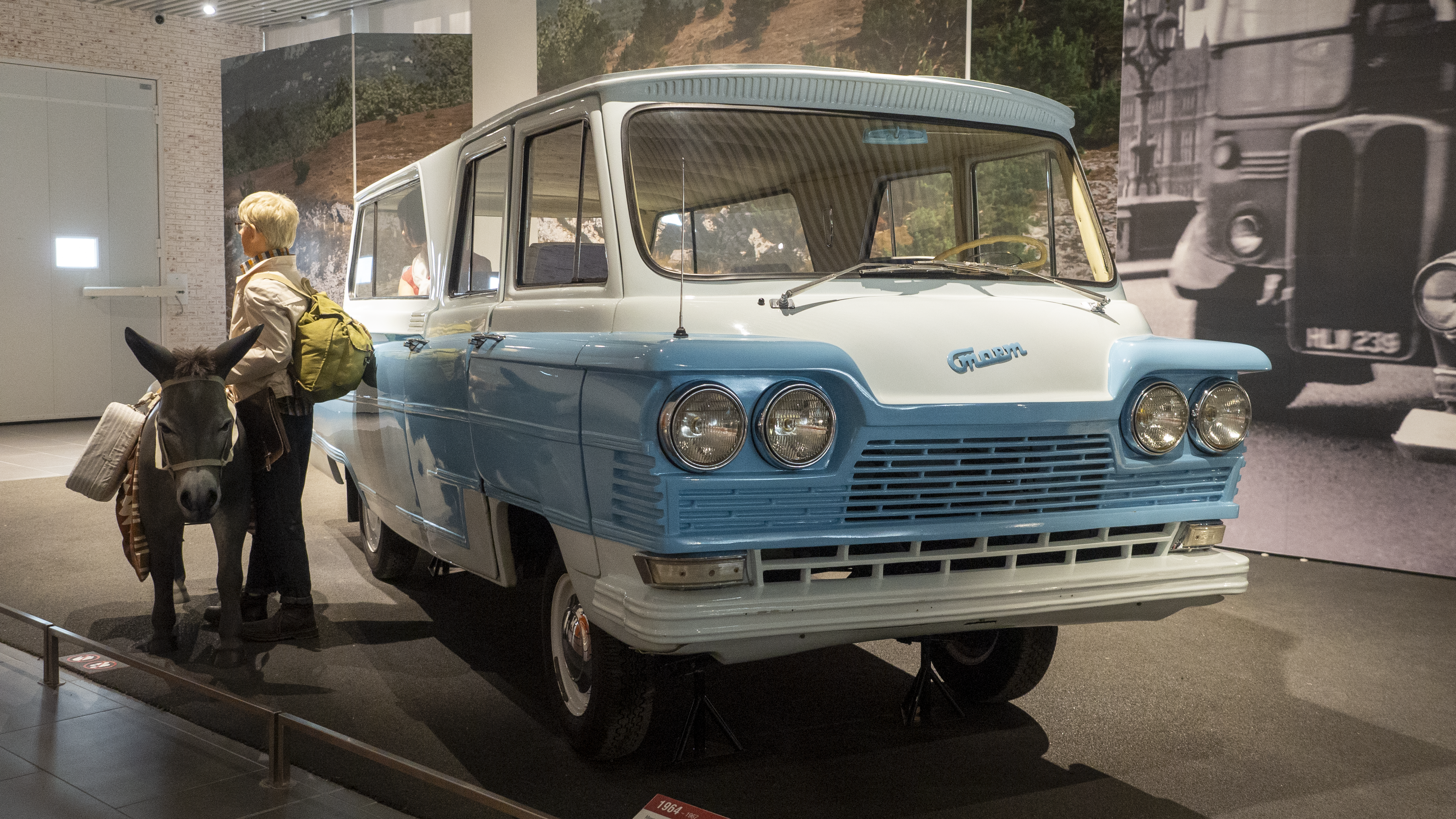
- Start in a museum in Yekaterinburg (2021)

Overview
- Manufacturer: SARB, LASCZ, KRZ, DAB
- Production: 1963–1968
- Assembly: Soviet Union: Luhansk
- Designer: A.S. Antonov and Yuri S. Andros

Body and chassis
- Body style: Minibus
- Related: RAF-977

Powertrain
- Engine: R4 gasoline engine
- Power output: 75 hp (56 kW)

Dimensions
- Wheelbase: 2,845 mm (112.0 in)
- Length: 5,535 mm (217.9 in)
- Width: 1,980 mm (78.0 in)
- Height: 2,085 mm (82.1 in)
- Curb weight: 1,320–1,770 kg (2,910–3,902 lb)

The Start (Russian pronunciation: [Старт]) was a minibus built in the Soviet Union from the end of 1963 in various auto repair and assembly plants. It is technically based on the GAZ-21 car and uses its drivetrain, chassis, and various small parts.

The vehicle, of which probably fewer than 200 units were produced, had a futuristic design and a handcrafted body made of fiberglass reinforced plastic. After several small series, production was probably finally discontinued in 1968.

== History ==
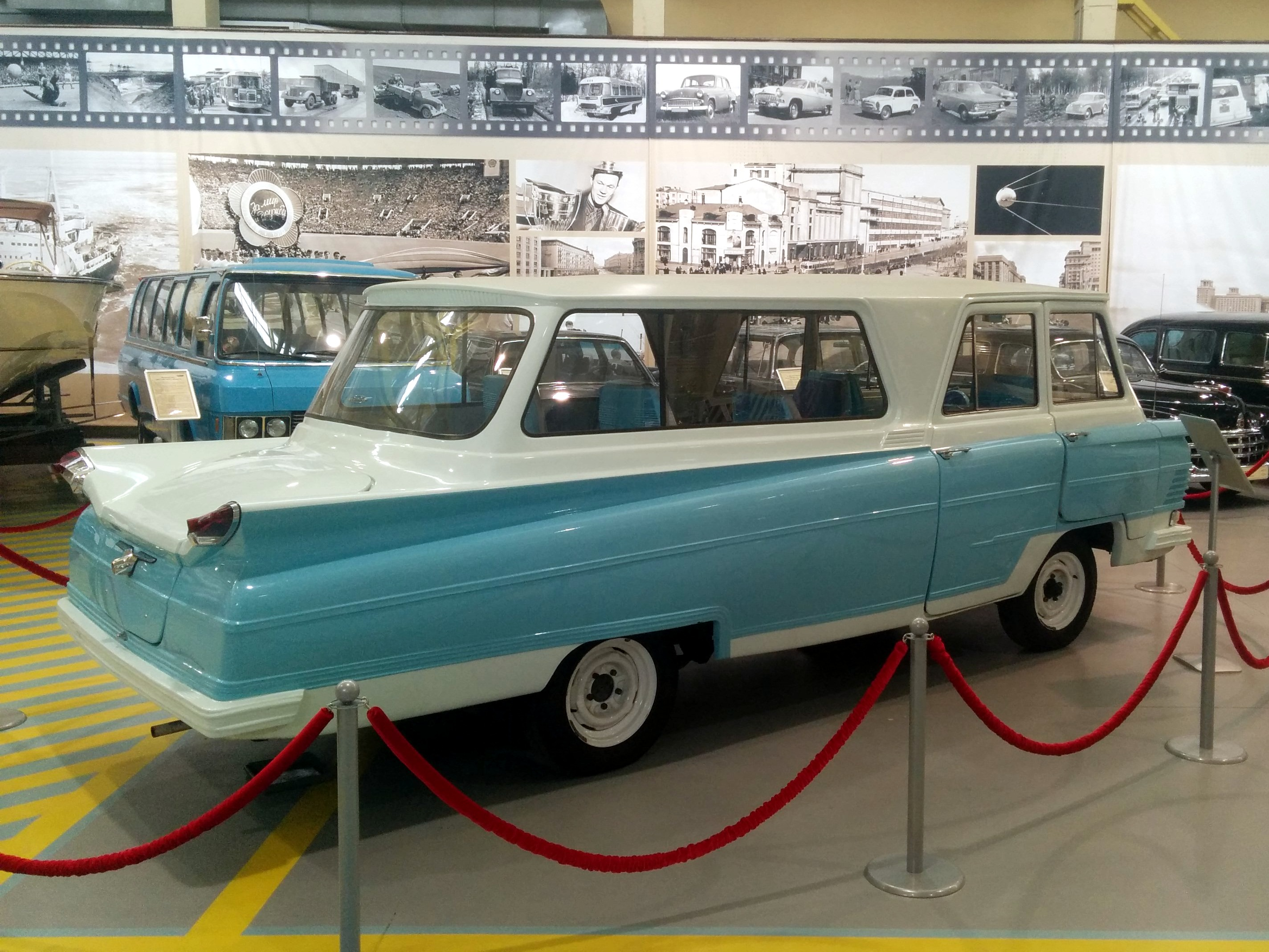
Rear view of a preserved Start in a Russian museum (2017)

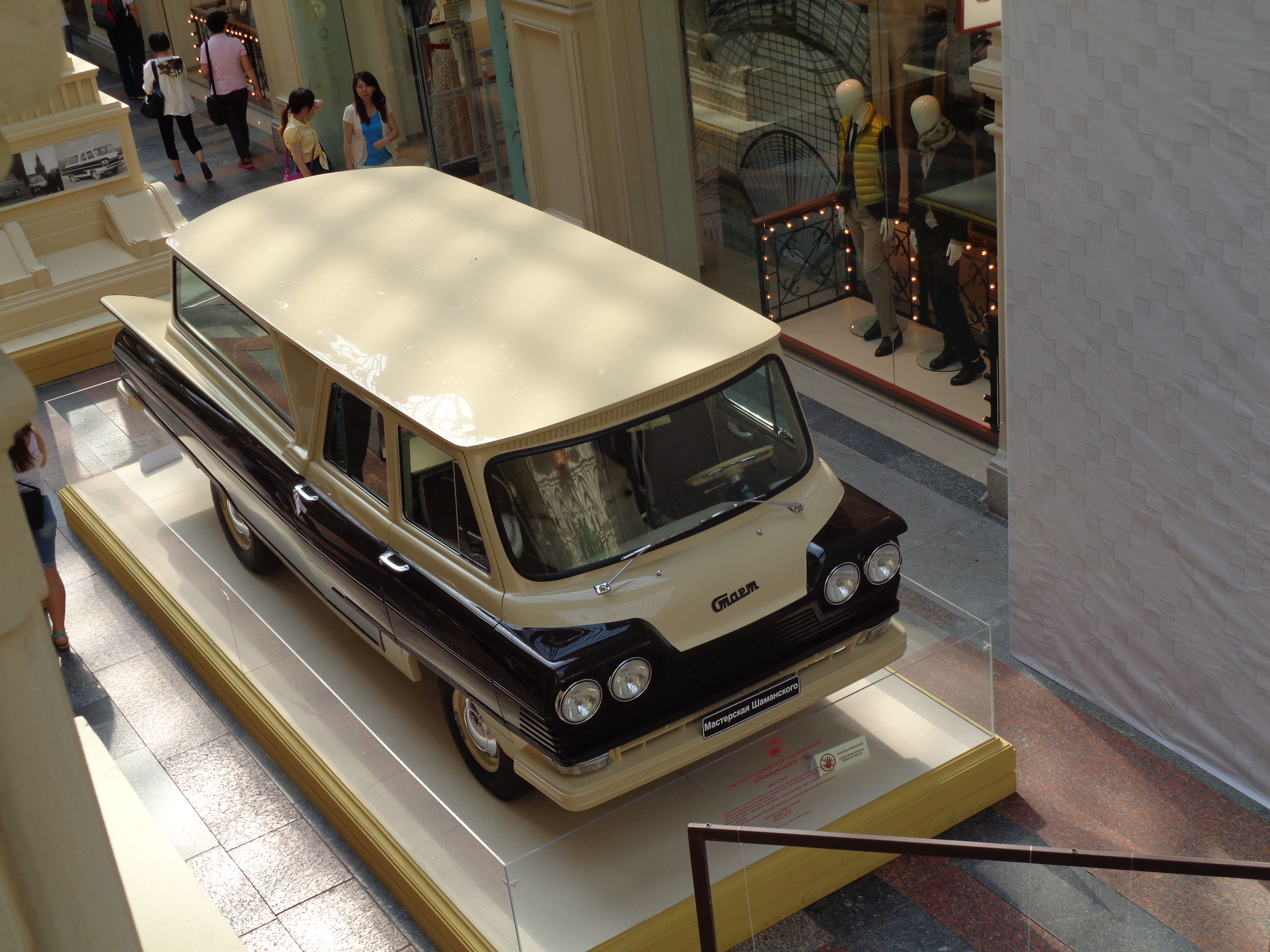
Restored Start in Moscow's GUM (department store) (2014)

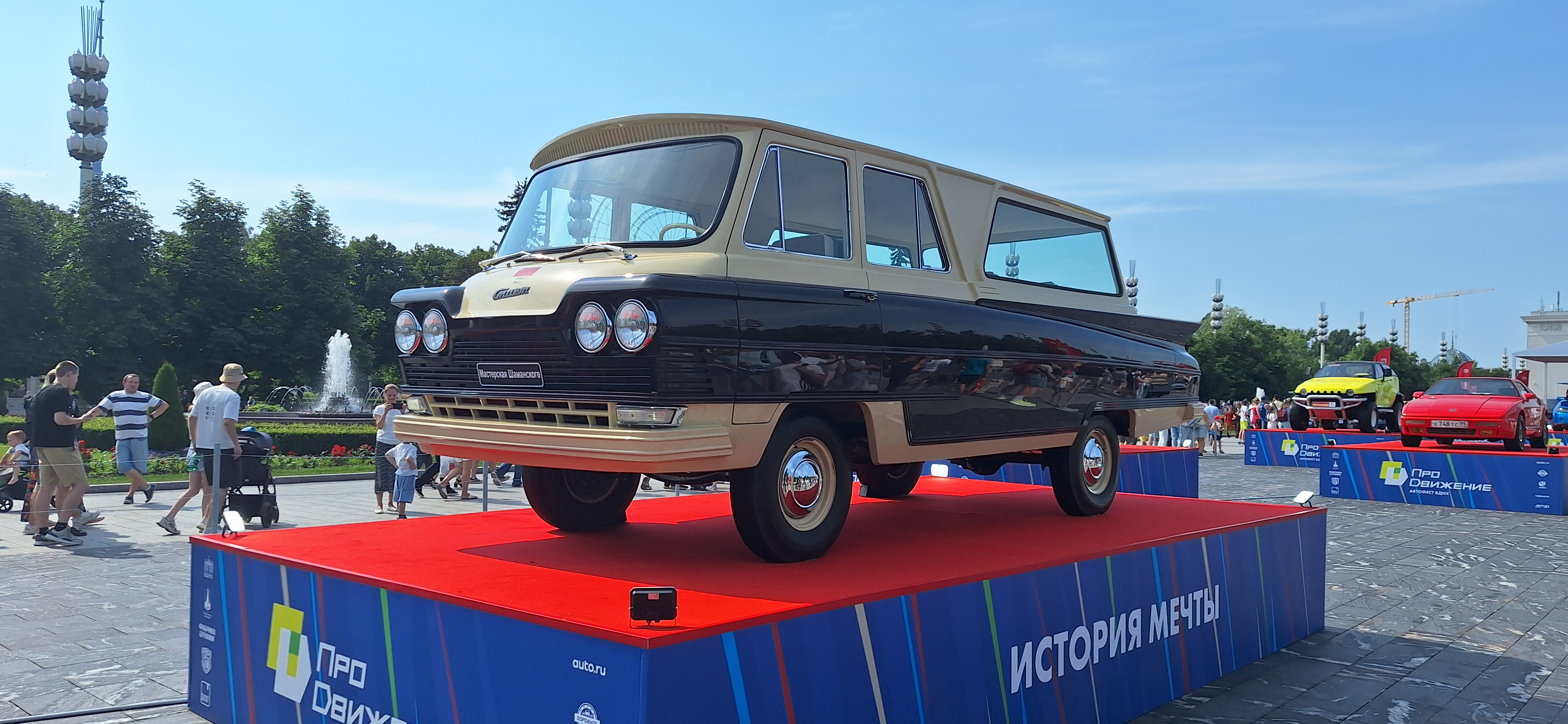
ProDvizhenie 2026.

The idea for a minibus with a plastic body and the initiative to implement it go back to A. S. Antonov. He became head of the transport department in the economic council of the Soviet city of Lugansk around 1960. Antonov was described as a restless spirit with many new ideas. He and a team of young engineers from the Severodonetsk Automobile Repair Base (SARB, Russian: САРБ) initially built a caravan with a fiberglass body. The material was readily available, as the region had a large chemical industry. Furthermore, its use was supported by the government.

After successful completion, it was decided to transfer the new concept to a minibus. For this purpose, two graduates of the local academy who had experience with plastic bodies from the racing car sector were hired, and a small design department was set up at SARB. Initially, a 1:10 scale draft was created. After the design was approved, a full-size plaster model was made. Based on this, the molds for the subsequent body parts were created. The mechanical components such as the engine, axles, and transmission were taken from the GAZ-21, as were various add-on parts such as lights, door handles, the dashboard, and the steering wheel. To achieve the necessary rigidity, metal reinforcements were laminated into the plastic parts.

The first minibus was completed in mid-October 1963. In December, Pravda reported on the project, and in 1964, the East German Kraftfahrzeugtechnik also reported, calling the vehicle a Trambus. The first vehicle was equipped with three benches (two longitudinal and one transverse to the direction of travel). A table was mounted on the hood, located inside the passenger compartment behind the driver and front passenger seats. After the work was completed, the bus was presented to the general public in Moscow. SARB then set up a small-scale production run using Volga spare parts and delivered the minibuses to selected customers. One example went to the film studios Mosfilm, and one to the local television station in Lugansk as an outside broadcast vehicle. The latter was the only special vehicle on a launch basis and remained in use until the 1980s. After the Gorky Automobile Plant (GAZ) no longer supplied Volga parts, the minibuses were only manufactured to order and upon delivery of the necessary components. By 1967, SARB had produced approximately 100 of these vehicles. Some of these served as luxury taxis in Moscow.

Antonov was transferred to the Economic Council of Donetsk in 1964. There, he simultaneously set up his own production facility at the Donetsk Auto Base "Glavdonbasstroi" (DAB or DAB for short). The minibuses were manufactured there under the name "Donbass," and a maximum of 10 units were produced.

In 1966, the Luhansk Automobile Assembly Plant (LSS or ЛАСЗ for short) began production of the Start. However, due to problems with the mold, only 20 units could be built. Unlike the previously built models, they received the suspension of the GAZ-12 ZIM, which significantly improved ride comfort.

From 1967 to 1968, the last Start minibuses were built at the Korosteny Avtoremontny Zavod (Korosten Auto Repair Plant, KRS or КРЗ) in Korosten. The chassis and drivetrain parts came from GAZ in Nizhny Novgorod, and the bodies from SARB. The remaining parts were manufactured locally. In this way, another 70 vehicles were produced.

The minibus cost 9,500 Soviet rubles new, making it almost twice as expensive as the GAZ-21 Volga, which sold for 5,000 rubles. The main reason for the high price was the low production volume and the high proportion of manual labor in the bodywork, which ultimately led to the discontinuation of production. The average annual income of a Soviet worker at that time was just under 1,000 rubles. Several Starts have survived to this day.

== Overview ==
Since only a few Starts were produced by different manufacturers and were hand-built, the technical data provided in the literature differ in some details. The values listed here apply to the "series" vehicles manufactured by SARB before 1965.

=== Powertrain ===
- Engine: Four-cylinder inline gasoline engine
- Engine type: "ZMZ-21A", from the GAZ-21 Volga passenger car
- Power: 75 hp (55 kW) at 4000 rpm
- Displacement: 2445 cc
- Bore: 92.0 mm
- Stroke: 92.0 mm
- Maximum torque: 167 Nm at 2200 rpm
- Compression ratio: 6.7:1
- Mixture preparation: Carburetor, type K-105
- Firing order: 1–2–4–3
- Starter: Type ST21
- Alternator: Type G12
- On-board voltage: 12 V
- Transmission: Three-speed manual transmission with reverse gear, partially synchronized
- Clutch: Single-disc dry clutch
- Top speed: 110 km/h
- Fuel consumption: approx. 21–21.5 l/100 km
- Drivetrain: 4×2 (rear-wheel drive)

=== Dimensions and weights ===
- Length: 5535 mm
- Width: 1980 mm
- Height: 2085 mm
- Wheelbase: 2845 mm
- Turning circle: 13.0 mm diameter
- Minimum ground clearance: 197 mm
- Interior height: 1408 mm
- Seats: 10+1, also stated as 12+1
- Curb weight: 1770 kg, older sources state 1320 kg
- Tire size: 7.00-15″
- Number of doors: 2 passenger doors + separate driver's door
