= RAF M2 'Stils' =

Van and minibus manufactured by Rīgas Autobusu Fabrika in Latvia

RAF M2 "Stils"
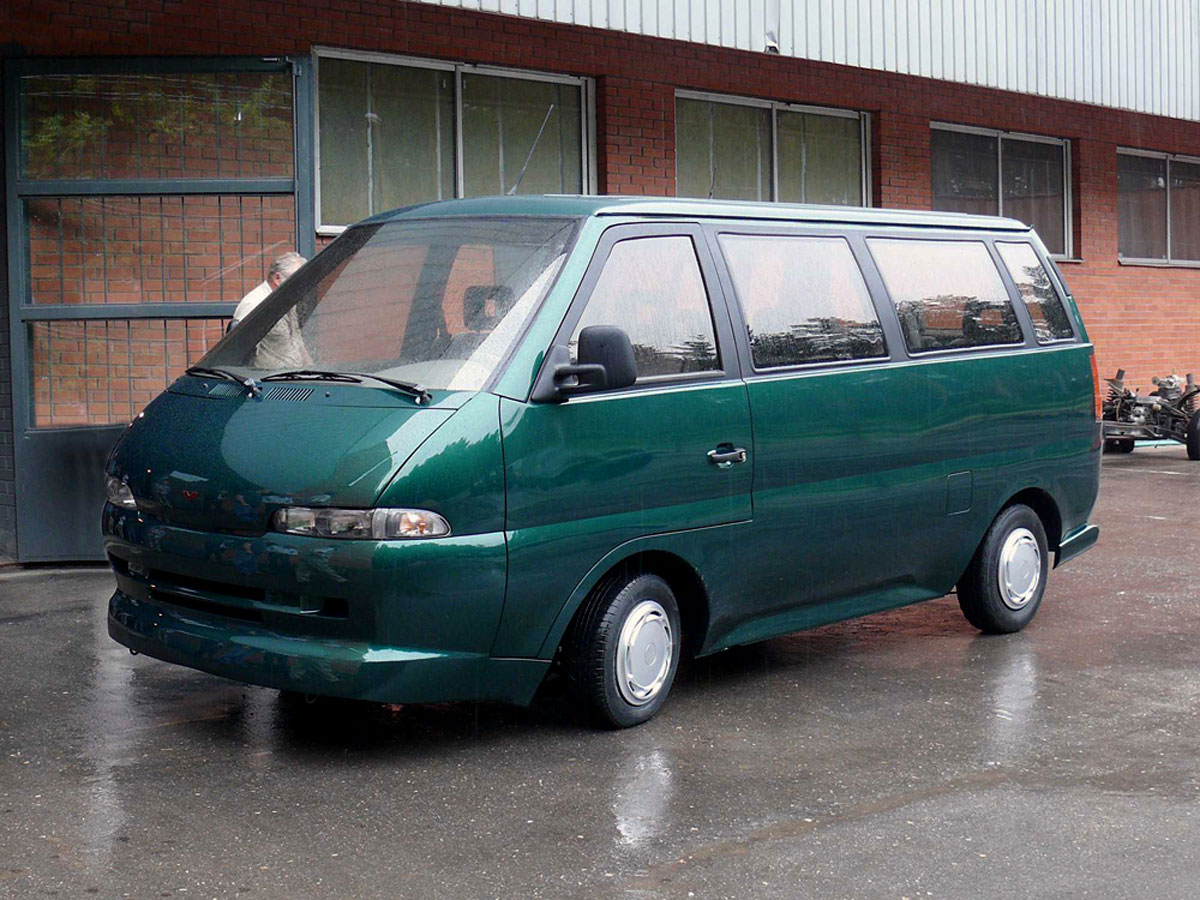
- RAF M2 "Stils"

Overview
- Manufacturer: Rīgas Autobusu Fabrika (RAF)
- Production: 1994

Body and chassis
- Class: Light commercial vehicle (M)
- Body style: 4-door van/minibus
- Related: RAF M1 'Roksana'

Powertrain
- Engine: ZMZ 4-cylinder, gasoline 2,3 liters
- Power output: 150 hp
- Transmission: automatic

Dimensions
- Length: 4850 mm
- Width: 2000 mm
- Height: 2050 mm
- Curb weight: 1800 kg

Chronology
- Predecessor: RAF-2203

The RAF M2 "Stils" was designed by Rīgas Autobusu Fabrika in 1994. It was designed to replace the aging RAF-2203 and offer a new modern vehicle to the newly opened market after collapse of Soviet Union. Only 2 prototypes were ever produced (one minivan, one ambulance) until bankruptcy of Rīgas Autobusu Fabrika in 1998. Both prototypes were lost after the bankruptcy but were found and shown to public in 2011.

Rīgas Autobusu Fabrika developed 2 concept models to replace the RAF-2203, the 1st concept being the RAF M1 'Roksana' and 2nd the RAF M2 'Stils' which was chosen as successor of RAF-2203, but start of mass production failed, hopes for small production failed soon after due lack of parts, budget and manpower.

This minivan used modernized version of ZMZ-406 4 cylinder, 2,3 liter gasoline engine. It used hydropneumatic suspension, much like some Citroën vehicles. The design was produced together with Russian NAMI (automotive institute). The minivan version could have seated 12 people and reach speed up to 170 km/h. Ambulance version could have seated 4 with 1 patient bed. Unlike the RAF 2203 or the prototype RAF M1 'Roksana', RAF M2 'Stils' was front-wheel drive.

== Gallery ==
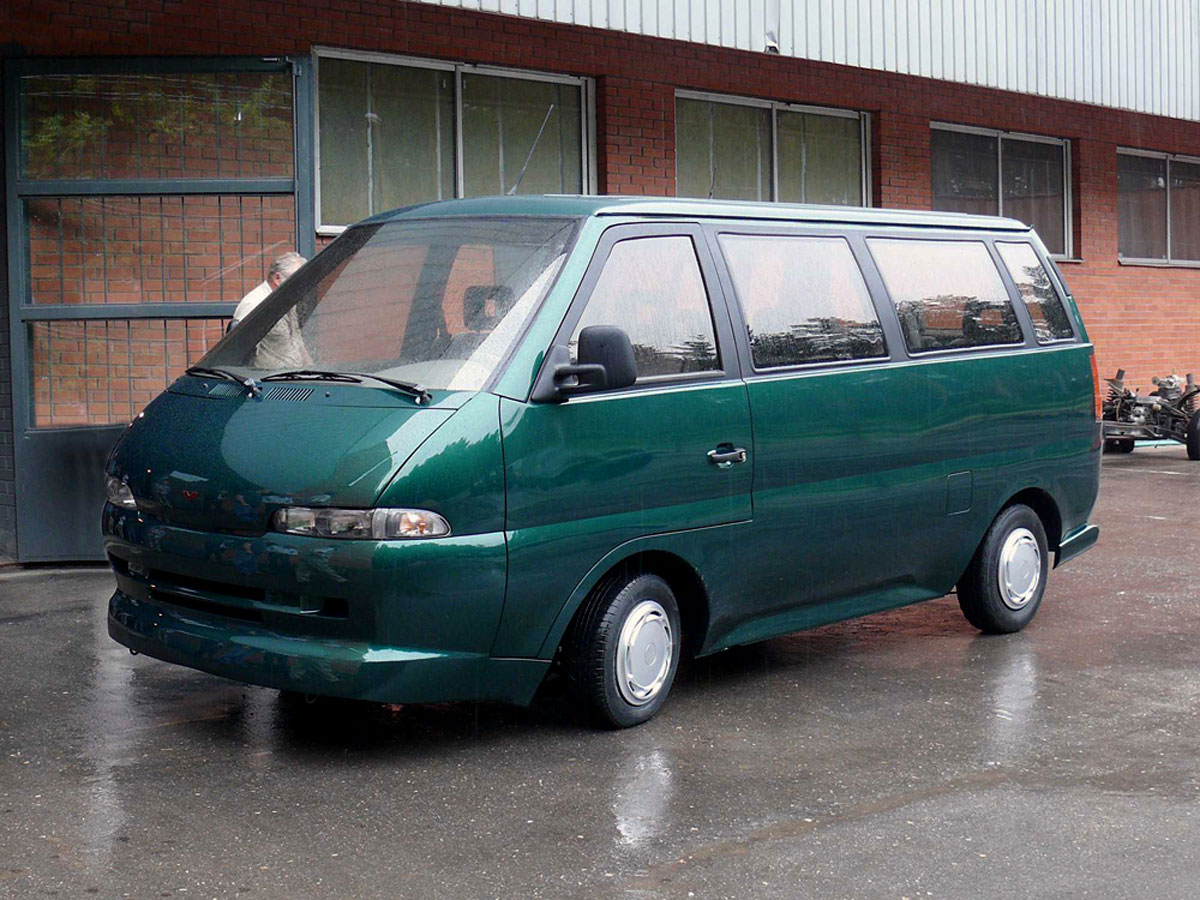
RAF M2 "Stils" Front

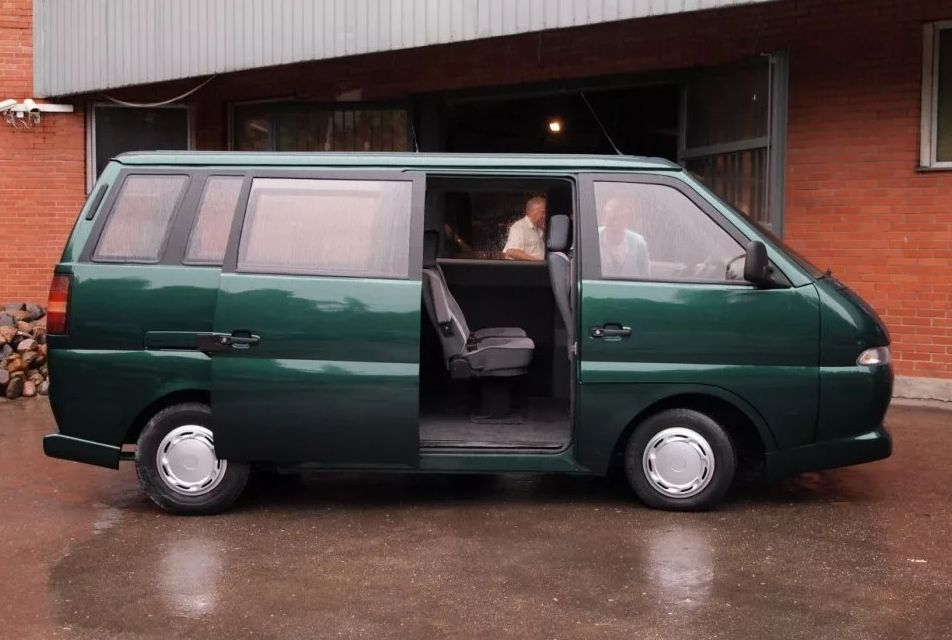
RAF M2 "Stils" Side

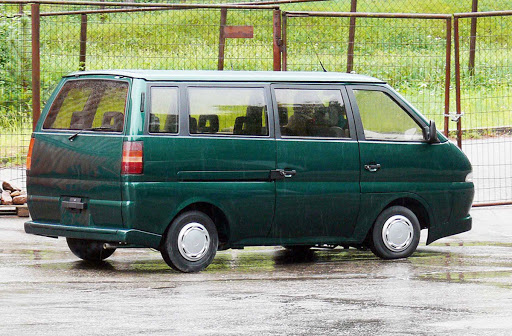
RAF M2 "Stils" Rear

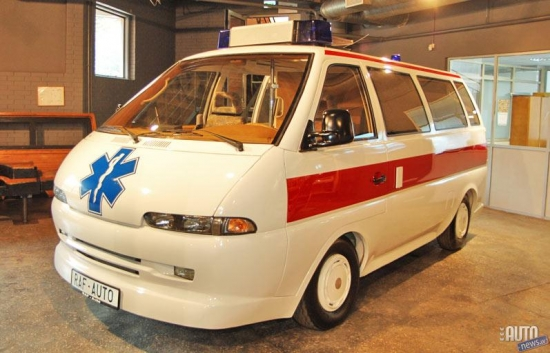
RAF M2 "Stils" Ambulance Front

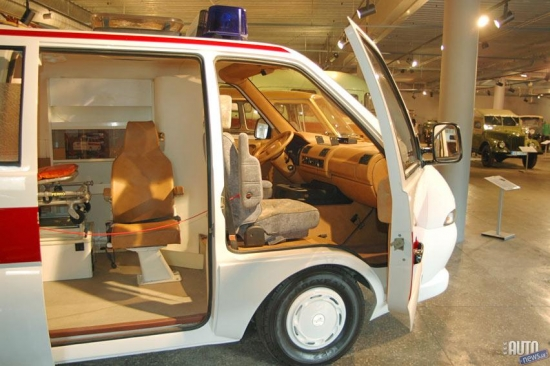
RAF M2 "Stils" Ambulance Side

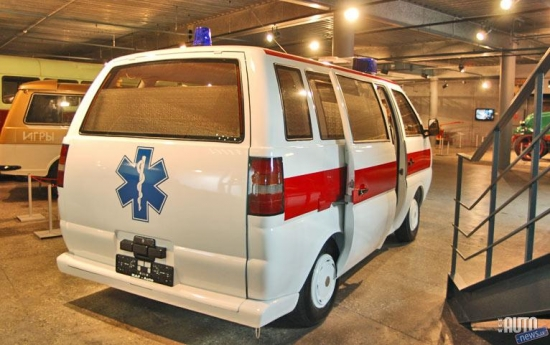
RAF M2 "Stils" Ambulance Rear

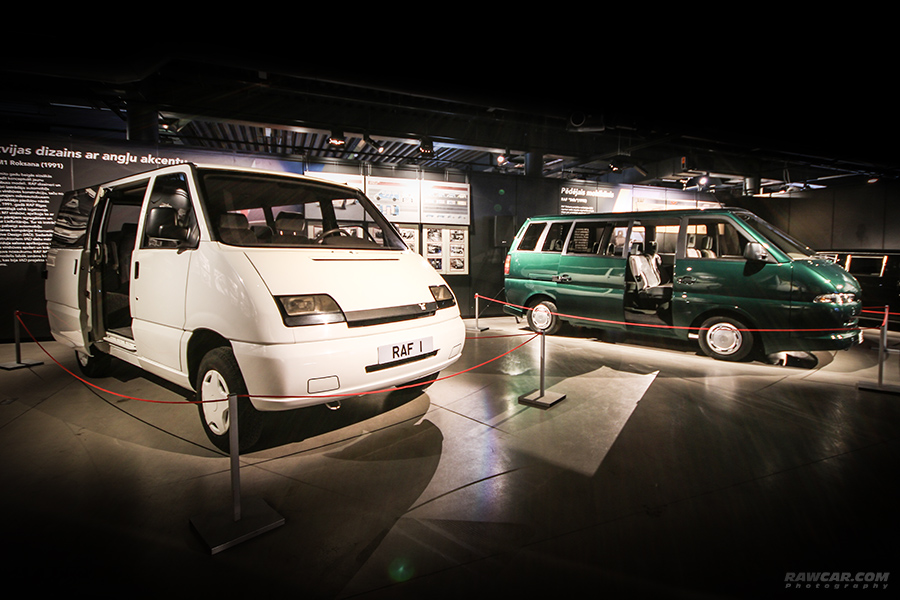
RAF M2 "Stils" and RAF M1 "Roksana" at the Riga Motor Museum
