= RAF M1 'Roksana' =

Van and minibus manufactured by Rīgas Autobusu Fabrika in Latvia

RAF M1 "Roksana"
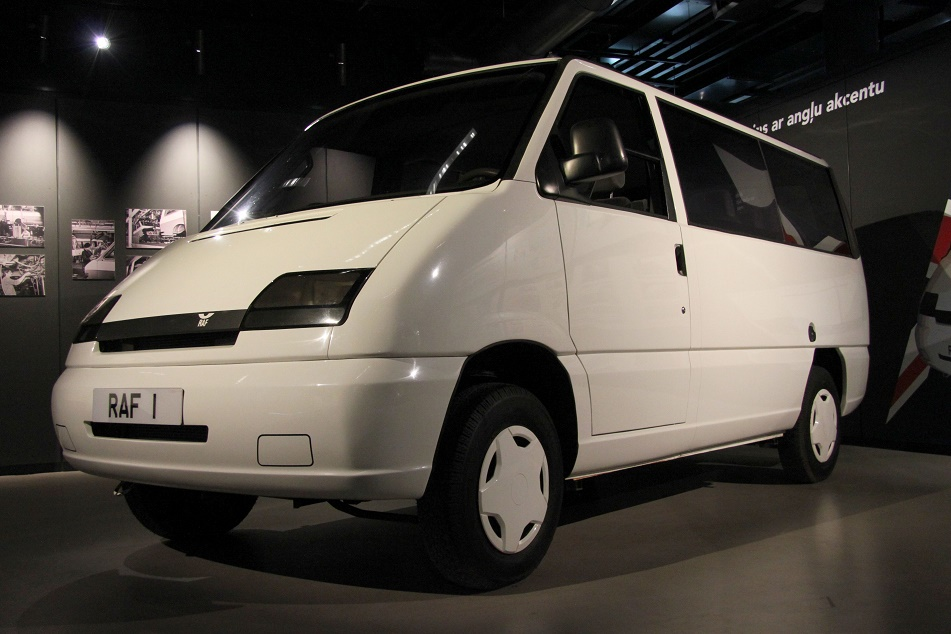
- RAF M1 "Roksana" at the Riga Motor Museum

Overview
- Manufacturer: Rīgas Autobusu Fabrika (RAF)
- Production: 1991

Body and chassis
- Class: Light commercial vehicle (M)
- Body style: 4-door van/minibus
- Related: RAF M2 'Stils'

Chronology
- Predecessor: RAF-2203

The RAF M1 "Roksana" was designed by Rīgas Autobusu Fabrika in 1991. It was designed to replace the aging RAF-2203 and offer a new, modern vehicle to the newly opened market after the collapse of Soviet Union. Only 1 prototype was ever produced until the bankruptcy of Rīgas Autobusu Fabrika in 1998. The prototype was lost after the bankruptcy, but was found in Ventspils in 2017 and soon presented to the public.

Rīgas Autobusu Fabrika developed 2 concept models to replace the RAF-2203, the 1st concept being the RAF M1 'Roksana' and 2nd the RAF M2 'Stils' which was chosen as successor of RAF-2203, but start of mass production failed, hopes for small production failed soon after due lack of parts, budget and manpower.

The body building and engine installation was done in Riga experimental workshop, after which it was sent to United Kingdom for final design works. RAF M1 'Roksana' was designed together with British International Automotive Design. The minivan could have seated nine people. Unlike the RAF M2 'Stils', the RAF M1 'Roksana' has stayed as rear-wheel drive as in its predecessor RAF-2203.

== Gallery ==
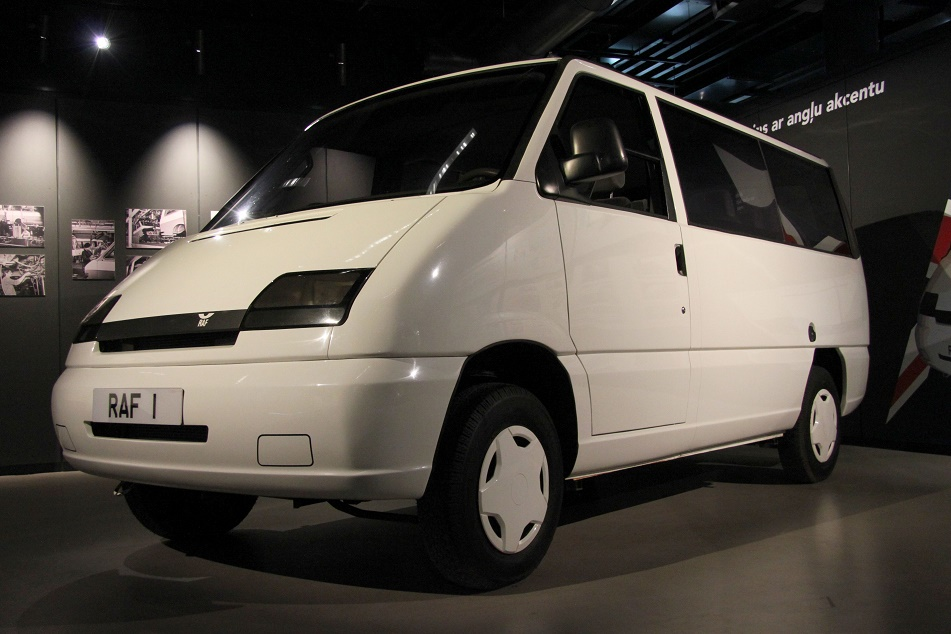
RAF M1 "Roksana" Front

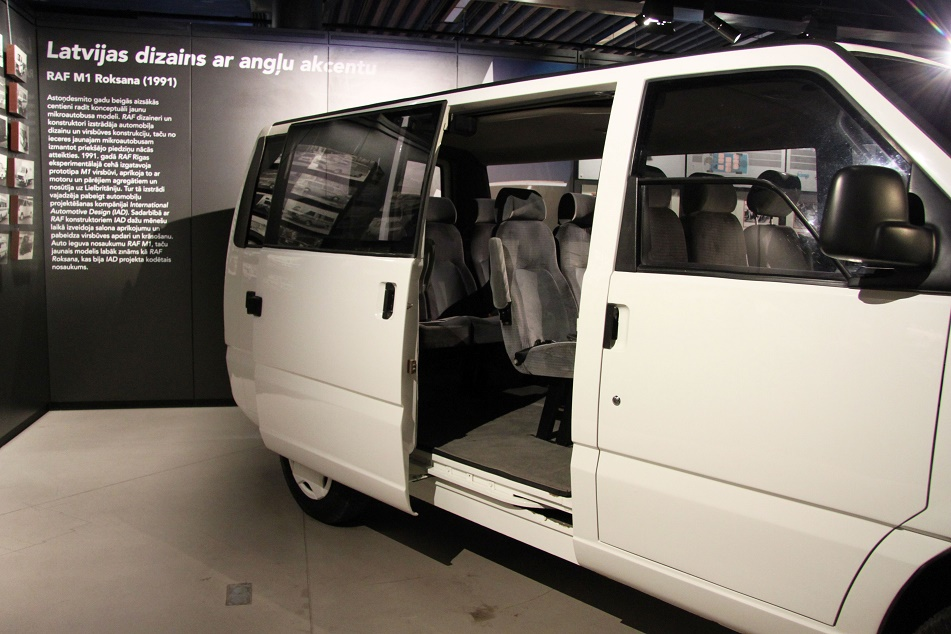
RAF M1 "Roksana" Side

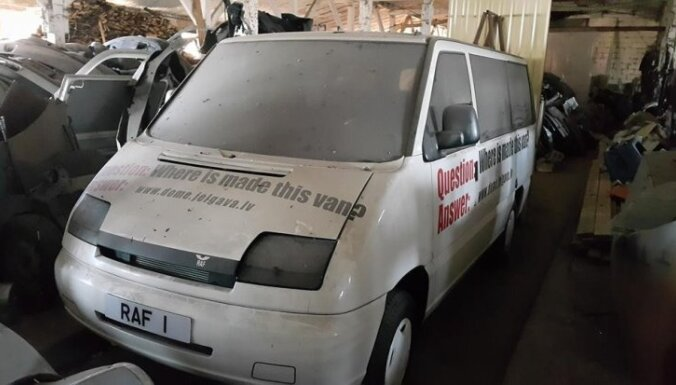
RAF M1 "Roksana" Front Abandoned

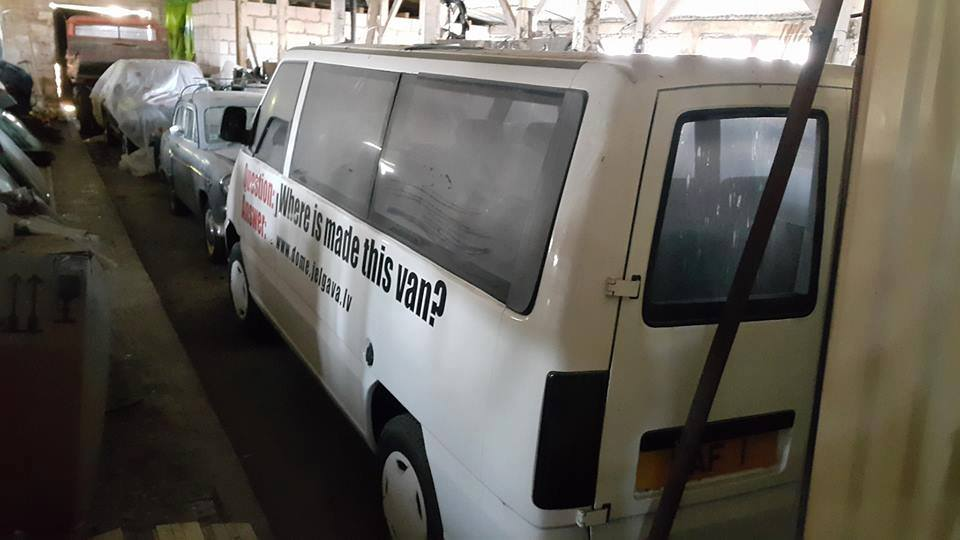
RAF M1 "Roksana" Rear Abandoned

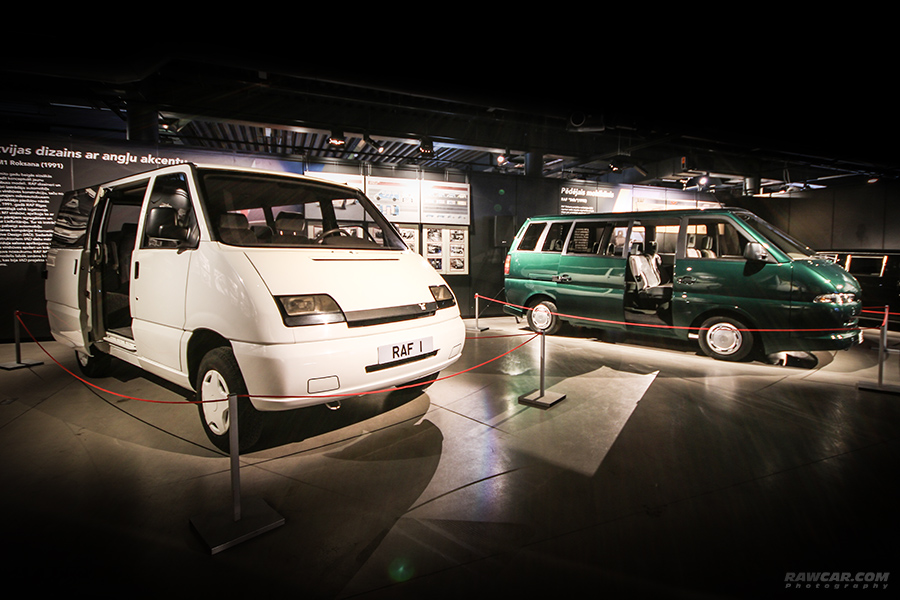
RAF M1 "Roksana" and RAF M2 "Stils"
