= ErAZ =

Former Armenian automobile manufacturer

Coordinates: 40°12′43″N 44°31′40″E

Yerevanskiy Avtomobilny Zavod (ErAZ)
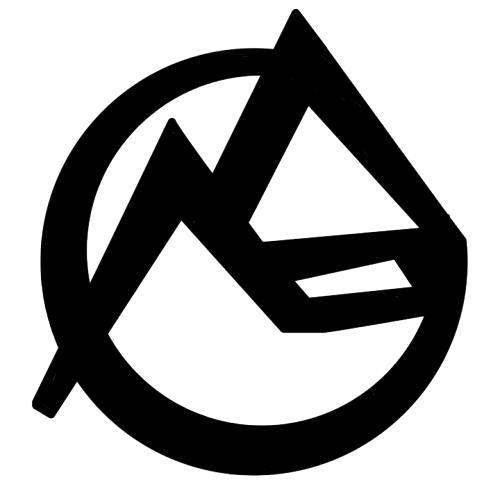
- Founded: 1964
- Defunct: 2002
- Headquarters: Yerevan, Armenia (formerly Soviet Union)
- Products: Vans

ErAZ or Yerevanskiy Avtomobilny Zavod (Armenian: ԵրԱԶ or Երևանի ավտոմոբիլային գործարան, Russian: ЕрАЗ or Ереванский Автомобильный Завод, lit. 'Yerevan Automobile Plant'), was an Armenian automobile manufacturer based in Yerevan, Armenia, mostly known for producing the RAF-977K van (ErAZ-762) from 1966 to 1996. Plans to establish the ErAZ factory came about on December 31, 1964, by the Council of Ministers of the Armenian Soviet Socialist Republic. The original staff were trained at the Riga Autobus Factory in Latvia and UAZ in Russia. ErAZ was privatized in 1995, and declared bankruptcy in 2002, closing its doors that same year.

== History ==
The company was founded on 31 December 1964, with Minavtoprom (the Soviet agency responsible for the automotive industry), to licence-produce the RAF-977 at a local forklift plant. In 1965, the first team consisting of around 66 people was created and in the beginning to serve Russian and Ukrainian manufacturers. On 10 September 1965, the company moved to its first factory. The first vehicle, known as the ErAZ-762 (known as Yeraz [Dream]), was built on 1 May 1966, assembling parts produced elsewhere. Production the first year was an estimated 1,000 units of the plant's design capacity of 2,500 vehicles per year. Early products had payloads of 800 kg (1,800 lb) and 1,000 kg (2,200 lb). They were vans and furgons, which were produced for the needs of the Armenian country and other republics in USSR.

The company built an improved ErAZ-762A beginning in 1969. Production climbed to 6,500 a year by 1973, and reached 12,000 in 1975, due to installation of a genuine assembly line, one of the Soviet Union's first of its kind.

ErAZ designers began to work on an all-new van, the ErAZ-3730 in 1971, following the lead of the Commer and Dodge Walk Thru. The first trial models were assembled in 1976; they never entered production, due to a lack of funds.

The ErAZ-762B began production in 1976. In April 1982, the company produced its 100,000th vehicle.

In 1997, ErAZ was declared bankrupt by a court decision.

== Models ==
- ErAZ-762 (762A, 762B, 762AIV, 762VAR) (1966-1996)
- ErAZ-3218 (1977-2002)
- ErAZ-3730 (1995-2002)
- eraz-2000 (2022)

== Gallery ==
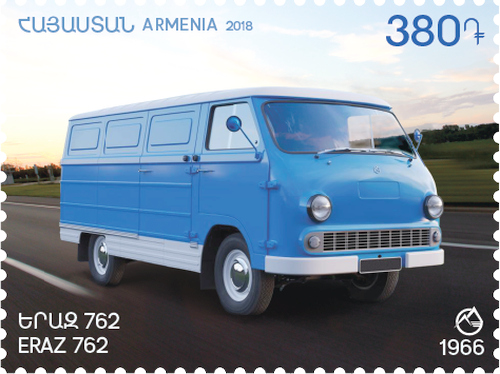
ErAZ-762B on a 2018 stamp

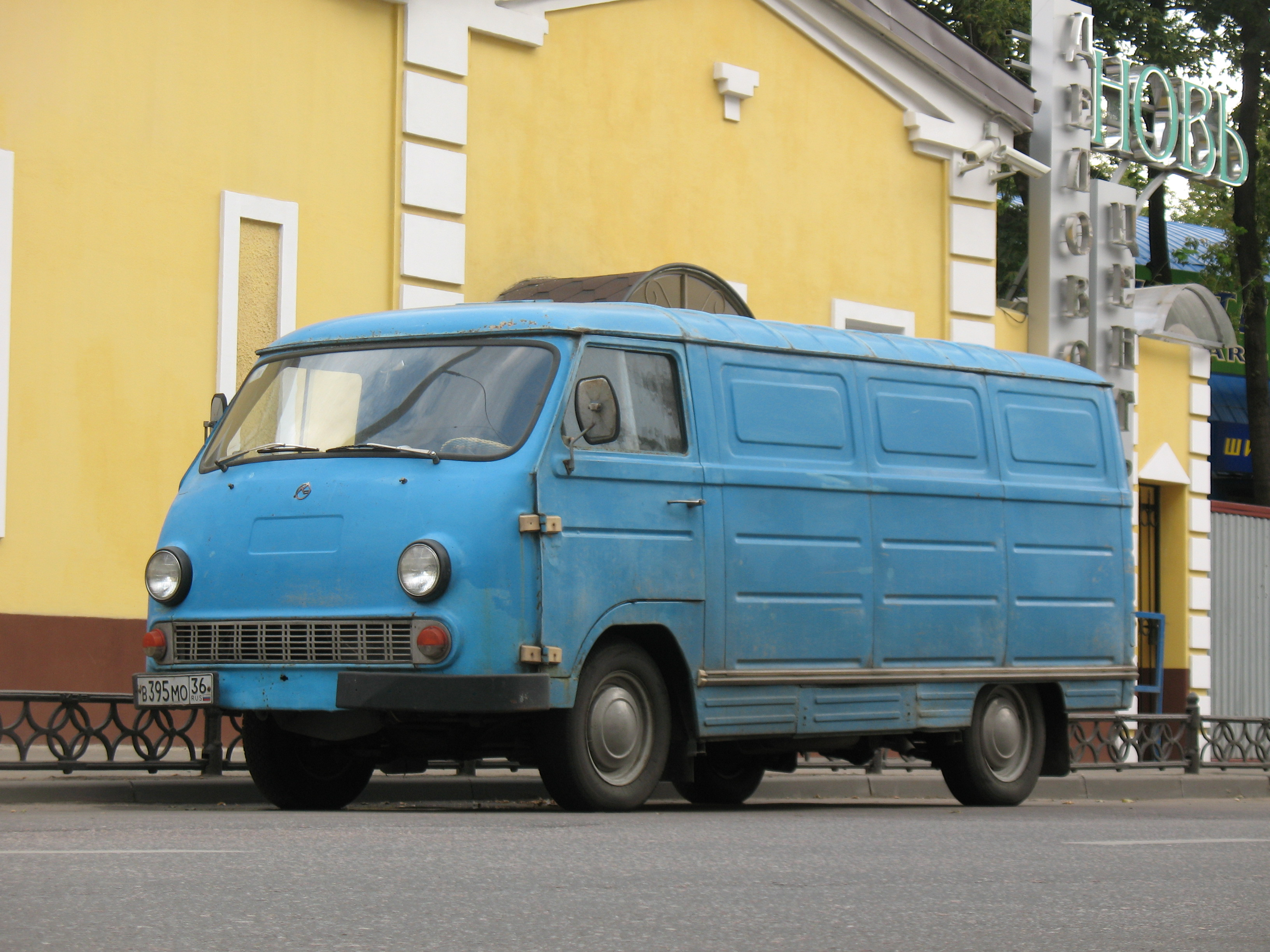
ErAZ-762V

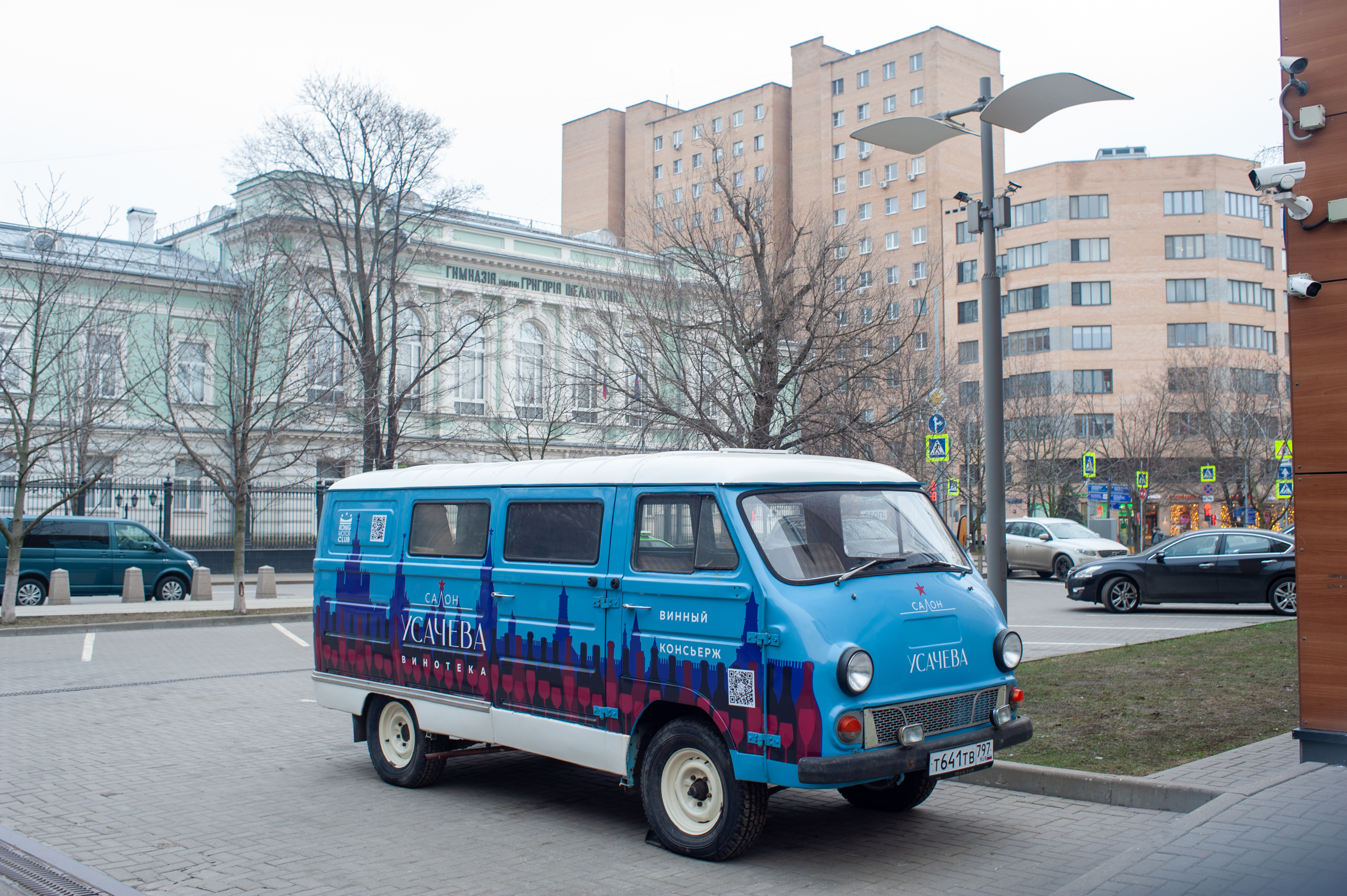
ErAZ-762VGP
