= RAF-2203 =

Van and minibus manufactured by Rīgas Autobusu Fabrika in Latvia

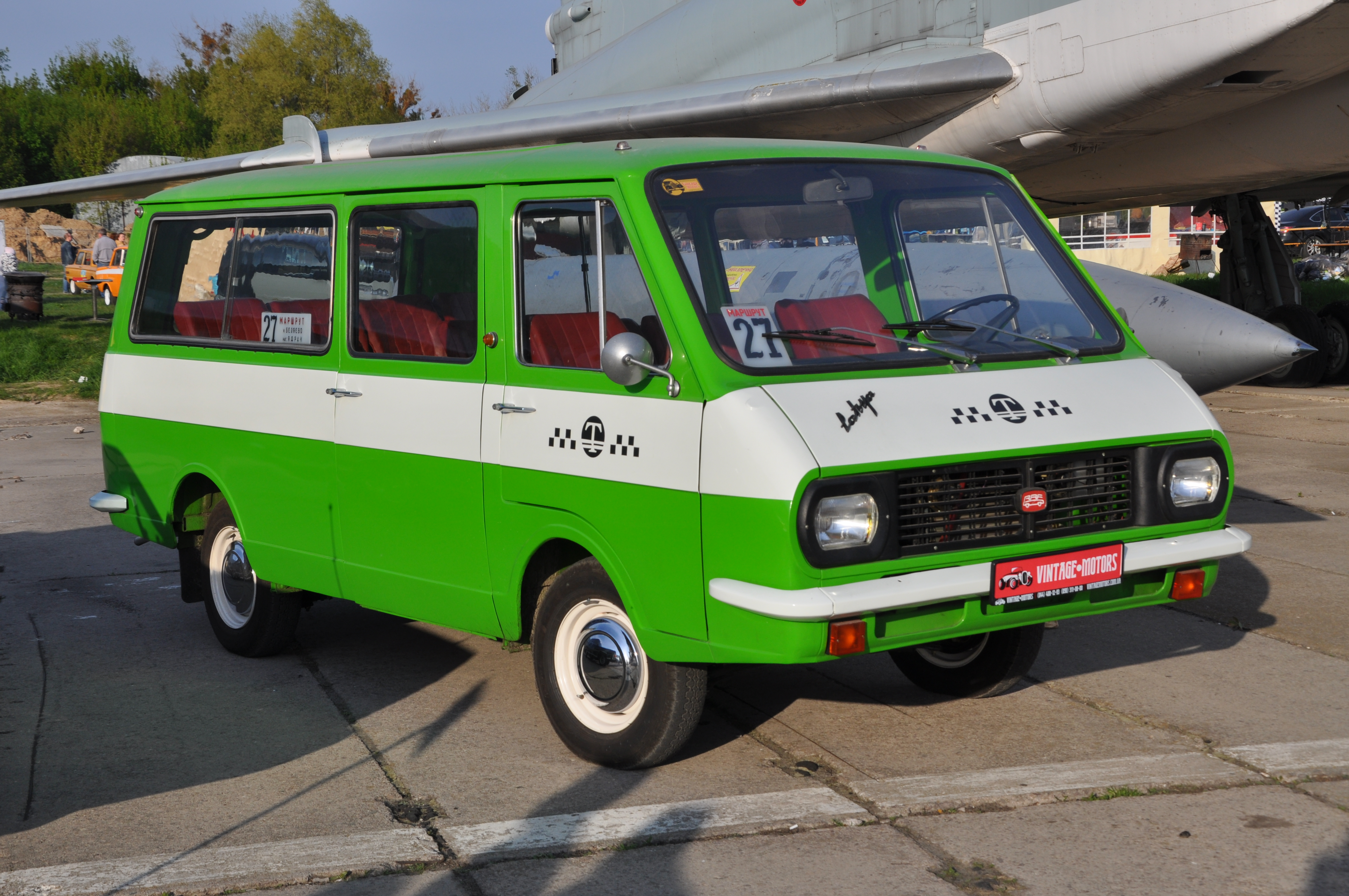
- RAF-2203 Latvija

Overview
- Manufacturer: Rīgas Autobusu Fabrika (RAF)
- Production: 1976–1997

Body and chassis
- Class: Light commercial vehicle (M)
- Body style: 4-door van 4-door minibus
- Doors: 4

Powertrain
- Engine: ZMZ 4-cylinder, gasoline 2,445 litres
- Power output: 95 hp
- Transmission: 4-speed manual

Dimensions
- Length: 4980 mm
- Width: 2035 mm
- Height: 1970 mm
- Curb weight: 1670 kg

Chronology
- Predecessor: RAF-977
- Successor: GAZelle (spiritual successor); RAF M1 'Roksana'; RAF M2 'Stils'

The RAF-2203 Latvija (nickname Rafik) is a cabover van designed and developed by Rīgas Autobusu Fabrika from 1976 to 1997. They were widely used throughout the USSR as fixed-run taxis (marshrutkas), medical cars, used for trade and as a special services vehicles. It was the successor of the RAF-977.

This van used the 2,445 cc (149.2 cu in) engine of the GAZ-24, between the front seats, making its construction similar to other competing vans such as the Dodge A100 and the Volkswagen LT, with independent front suspension also from the GAZ-24 (but springs from the GAZ-13). It borrowed headlights and brake system parts from the Moskvitch 412, outside door handles from the Moskvitch 408, and 15 in (38 cm) wheels of the GAZ-21 Volga. The single rear door hinged at the top, rather than the more-usual side-opening. There were two major models: one, the 2203, seated ten plus driver and passenger, powered by a 95 hp (71 kW; 96 PS) 2,445 cc (149.2 cu in) with 8.2:1 compression; the other, the 22032, a twelve-seat "route taxi", had longitudinal seats and lower 6.7:1 compression (to use more readily available 76 octane petrol), and produced only 85 hp (63 kW; 86 PS). (The 2203-02 would run on liquified propane). An ambulance, the 22031, was soon added to the range, and made up fully a third of all 2203s built; there was also a 22035 for blood donor clinics. These were joined by the 22034, for fire departments.

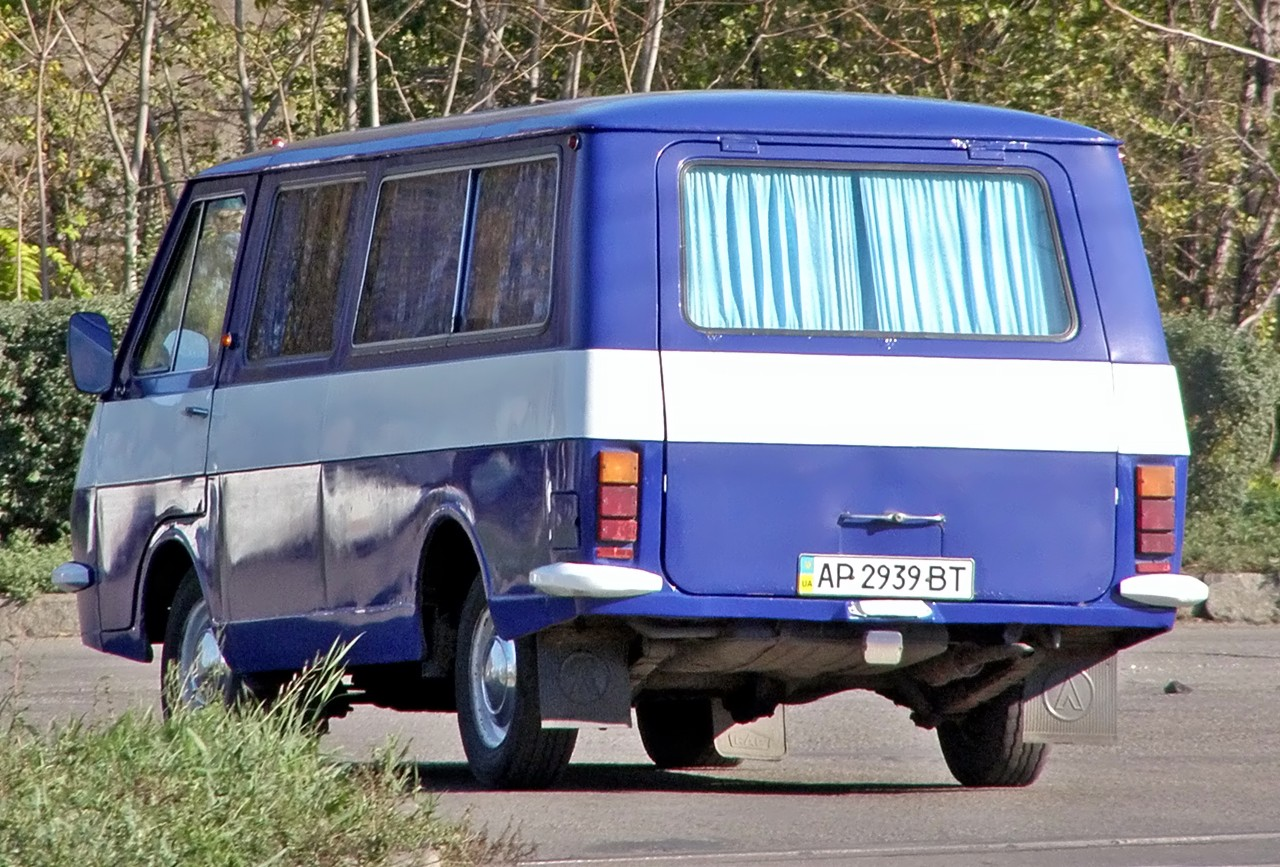
RAF-2203 Rear

In addition to the uncommon 22033 and 22036 for state militias, there were prototype electric vehicles.

While the 2203 looked good, it was susceptible to rust, especially in the frame rails, and was unpleasant to drive in bad weather. Quality control of the assembly was also poor. Oil leaks and axle bearing failures were frequent. It also suffered overheating, serious vibration issues, failures of front suspension parts leading to poor handling, and high fuel consumption. On top of it all, access to the cab was difficult, despite the forward-control position.

After the collapse of the Soviet Union, sales of the RAF-2203 plummeted, and sales in export markets began to gradually disappear. It was planned to sell the RAF, along with the RAF-2203 model, to GAZ in Russia, which would continue production under its own name, but for political and economic reasons, this project was eventually cancelled. In 1998, the RAF went bankrupt and production of the RAF-2203 van stopped. Nevertheless, the idea of a Russian van using components from passenger cars, most notably the GAZ Volga, was later taken up by the GAZelle light commercial vehicle, which largely replaced the RAF-2203 in its minibus and van roles in the post-Soviet states.

== Variants ==
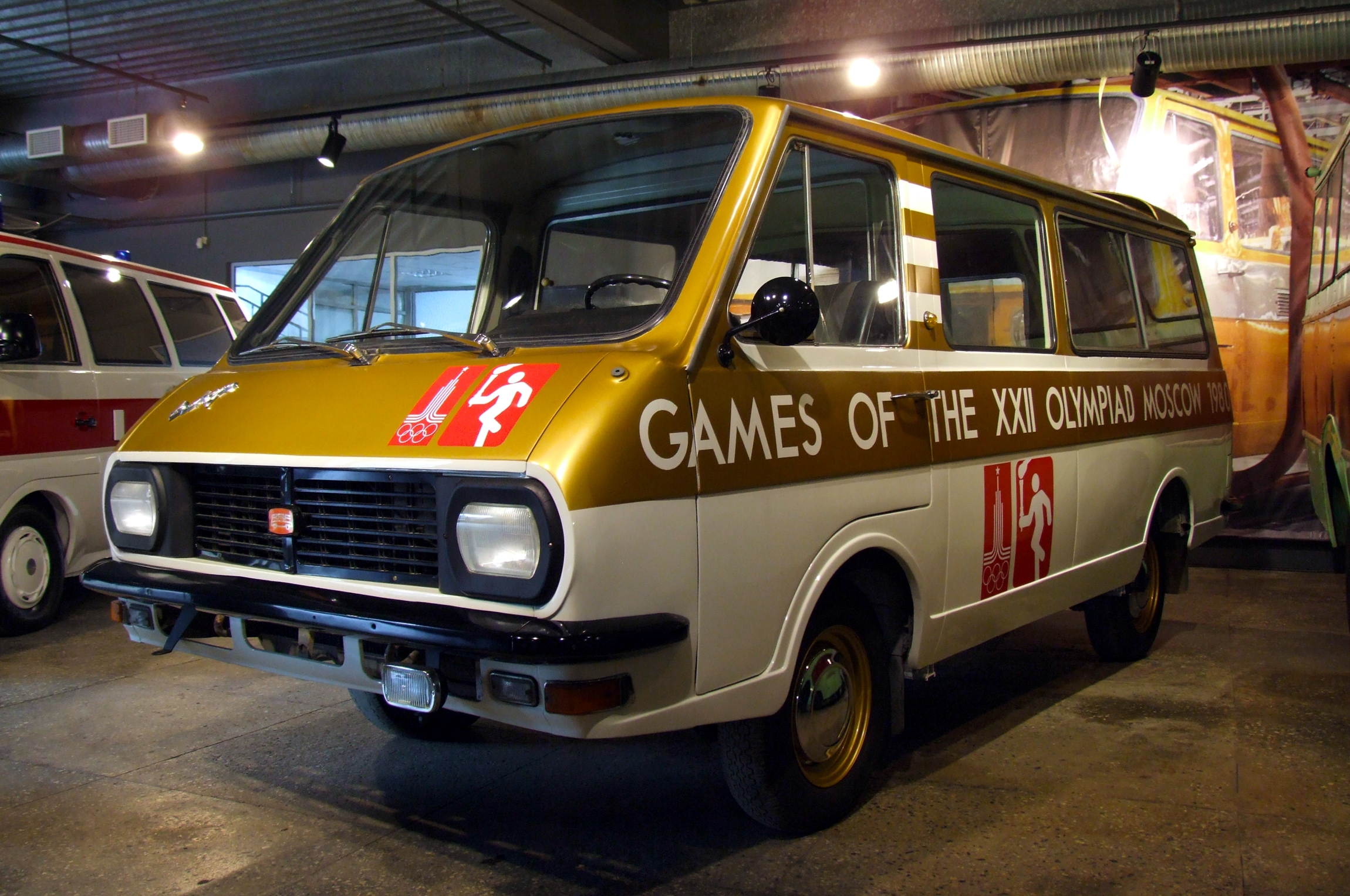
An RAF-2907 adopted for use at the 1980 Summer Olympics.

- RAF-2203 Latvija – 4x2 4dr van, 1976
- RAF-2203 Latvija [delivery] – 4x2 4dr delivery van
- RAF-2203 Latvija [cardiology] – 4x2 4dr cardiac ambulance
- RAF-2203 Latvija [fire] – 4x2 4dr fire minivan
- RAF-2203 Latvija GAI – 4x2 4dr police van
- RAF-2203 Latvija [mail] – 4x2 4dr mail van
- RAF-2203 [taxi] – 4x2 4dr taxi van
- RAF-2203 Latvija VAI – 4x2 4dr military police van
- RAF-22031 (РАФ-22031 "Скорая помощь") – 4x2 4dr ambulance. As a result of the installation of emergency vehicle lighting, portable two-way radio transceiver and medical equipment (artificial respiration apparatus, oxygen, standard medical stretcher, etc.), the weight of the car increased by 290 kilograms compared to the standard passenger version.
- RAF-2907 – special car based on RAF-2203

== Gallery ==
RAF-2203

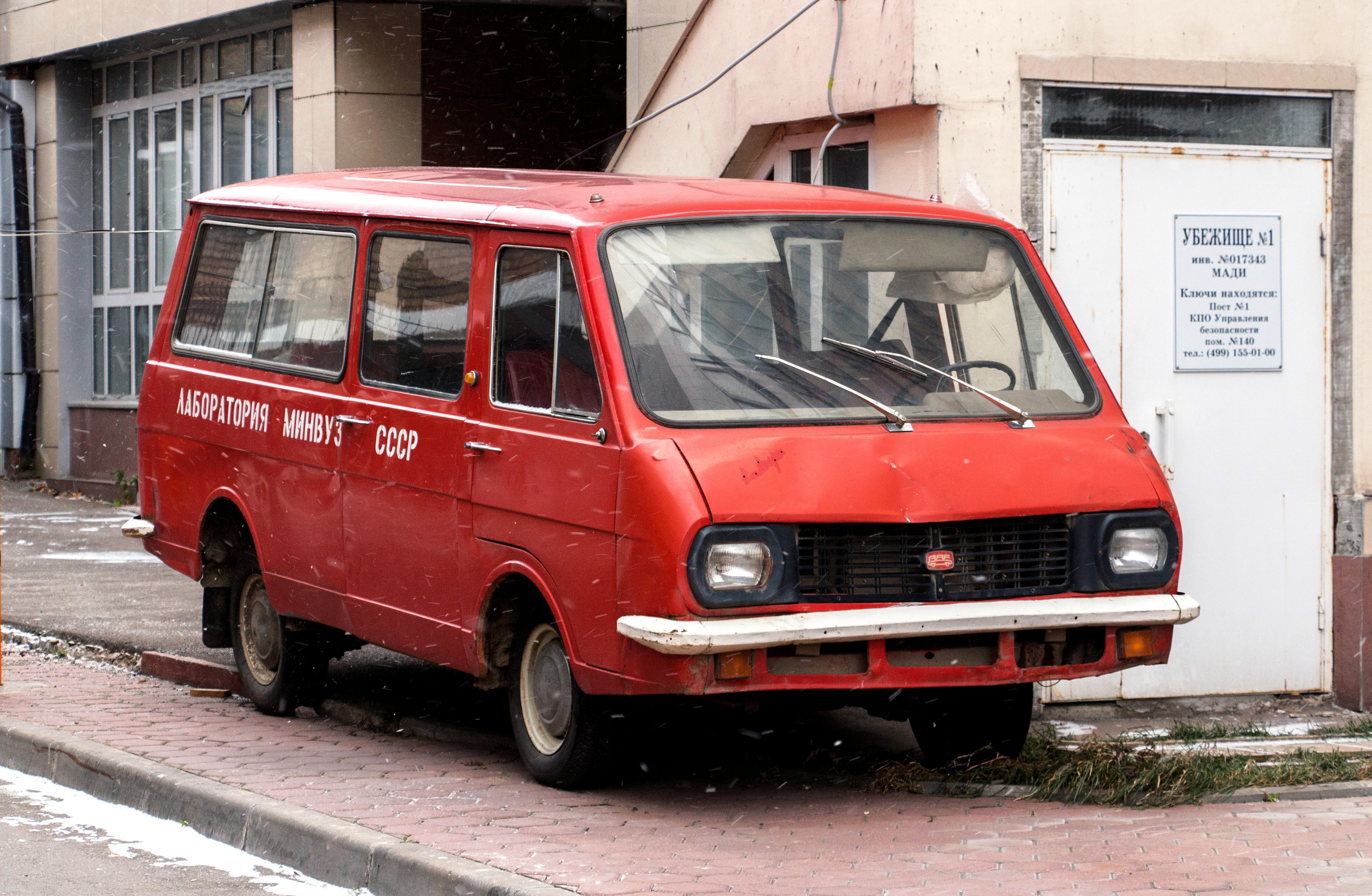
RAF-2203

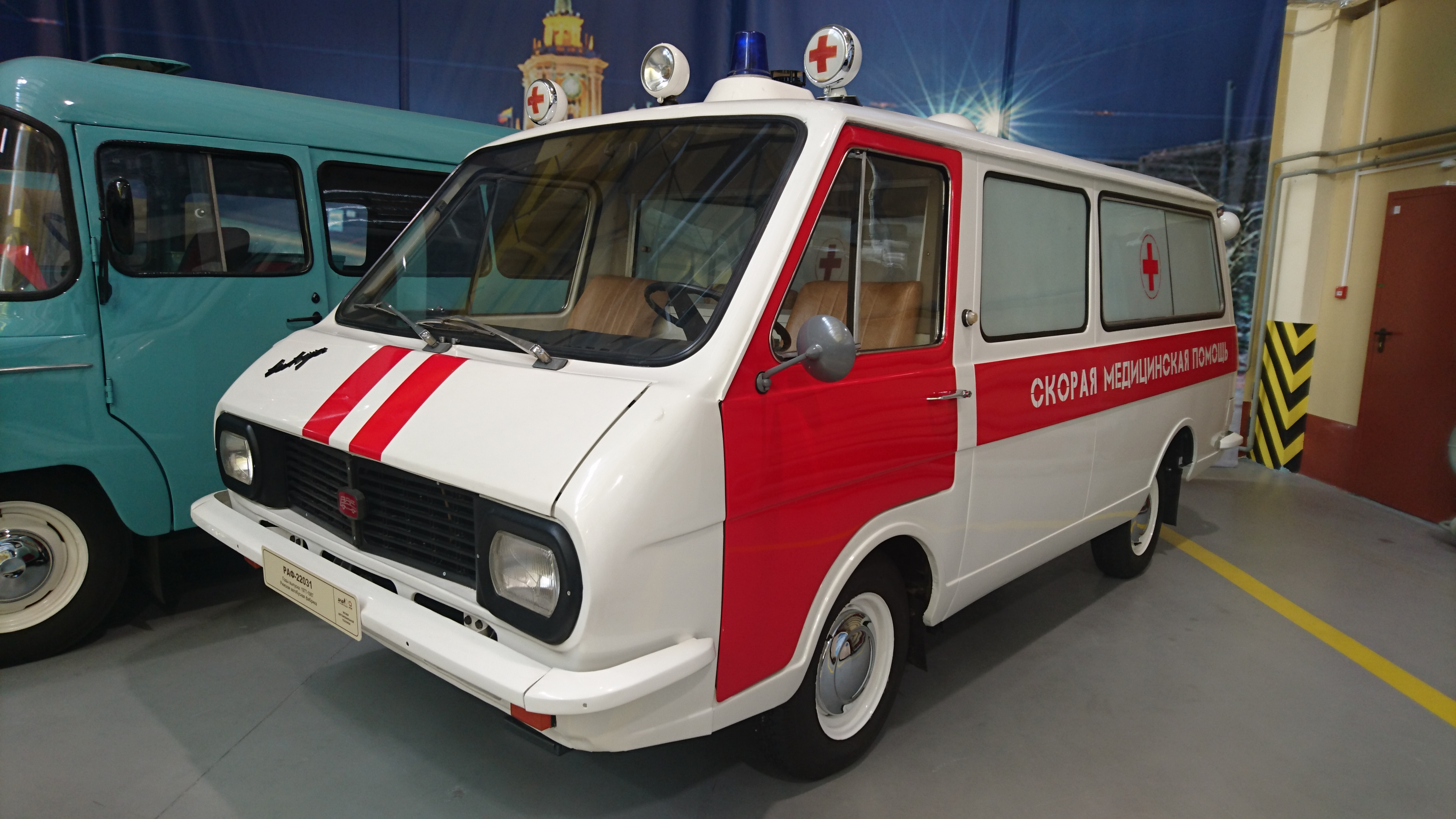
RAF-22031

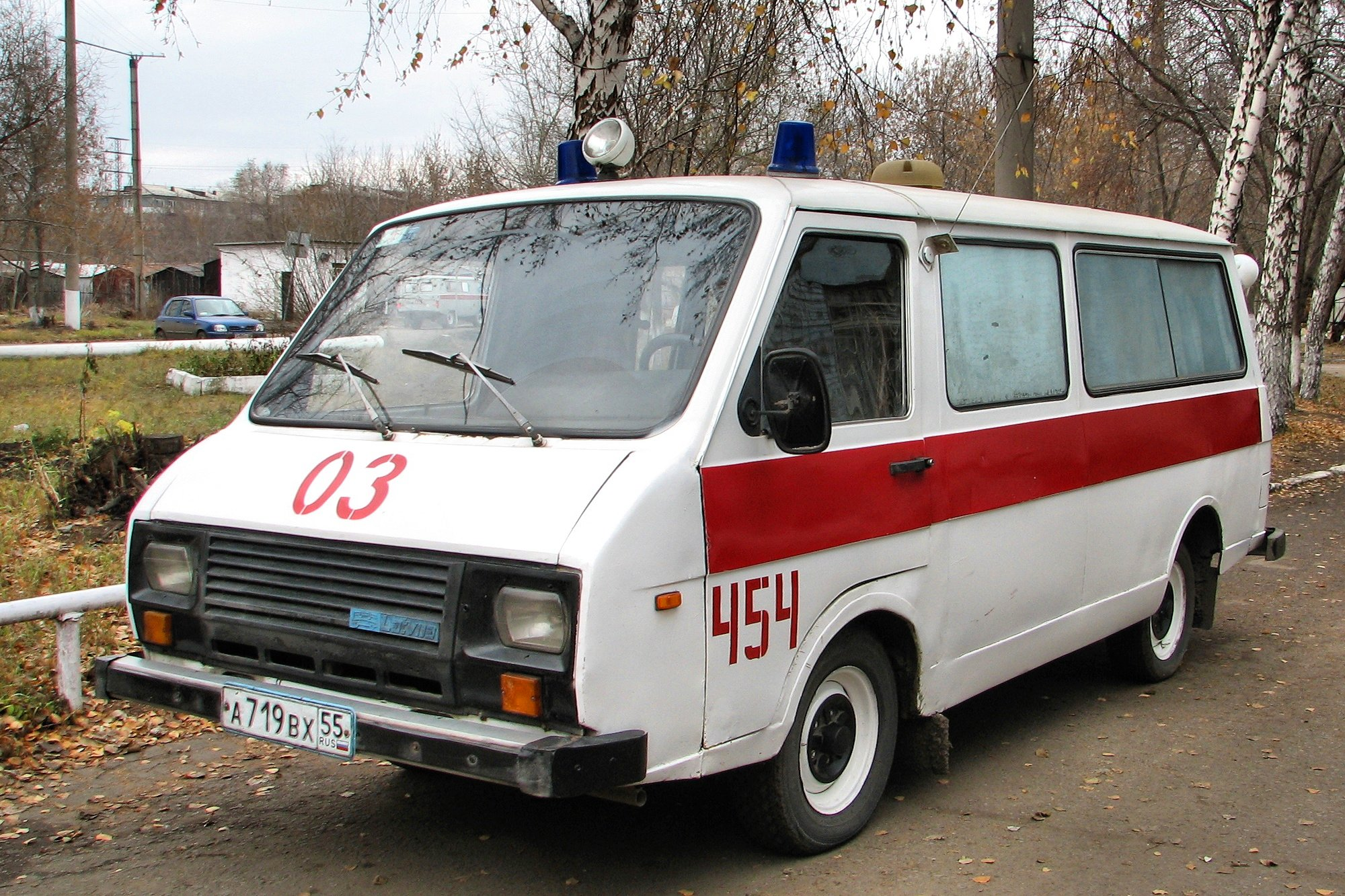
RAF-2915-02

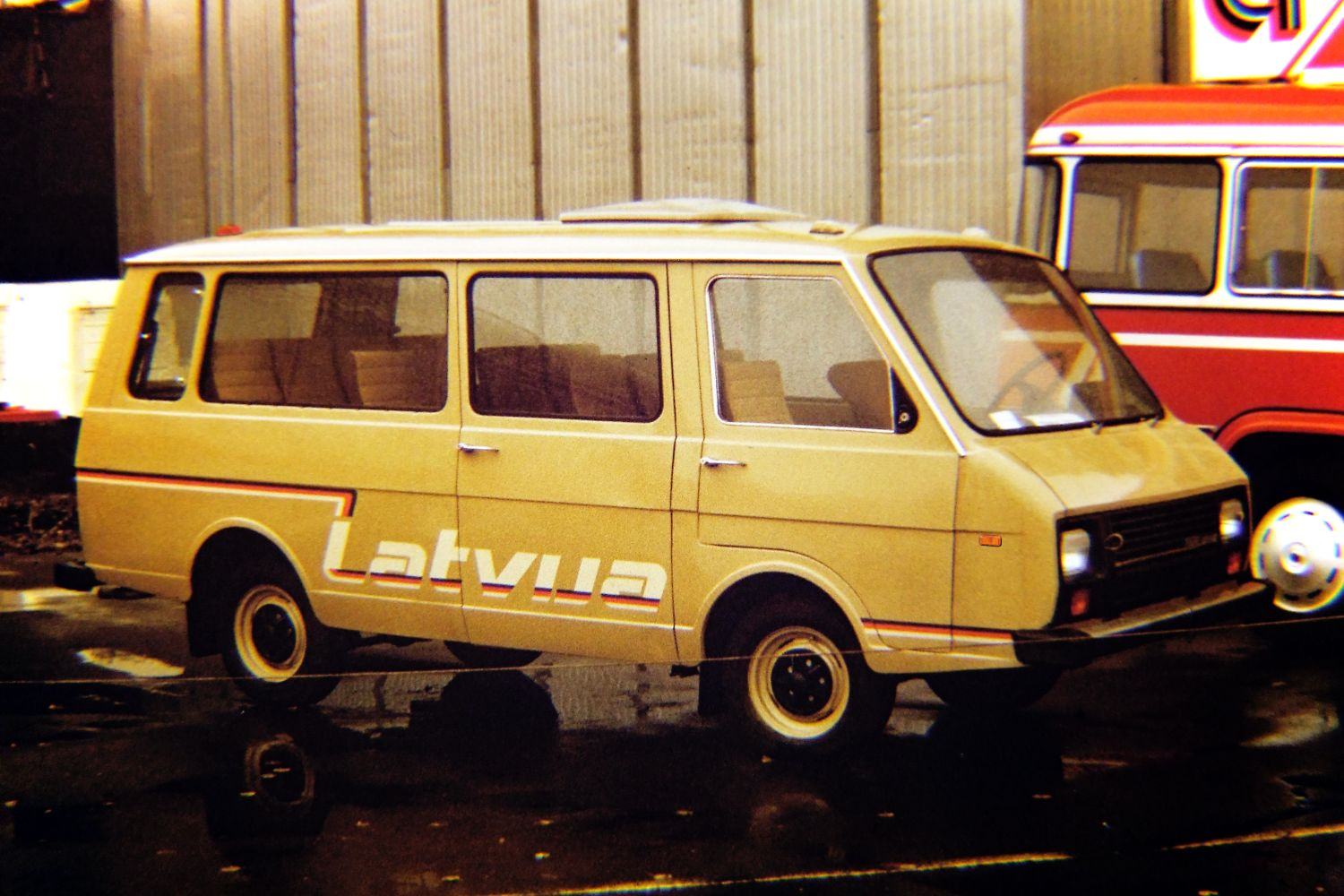
RAF-22038

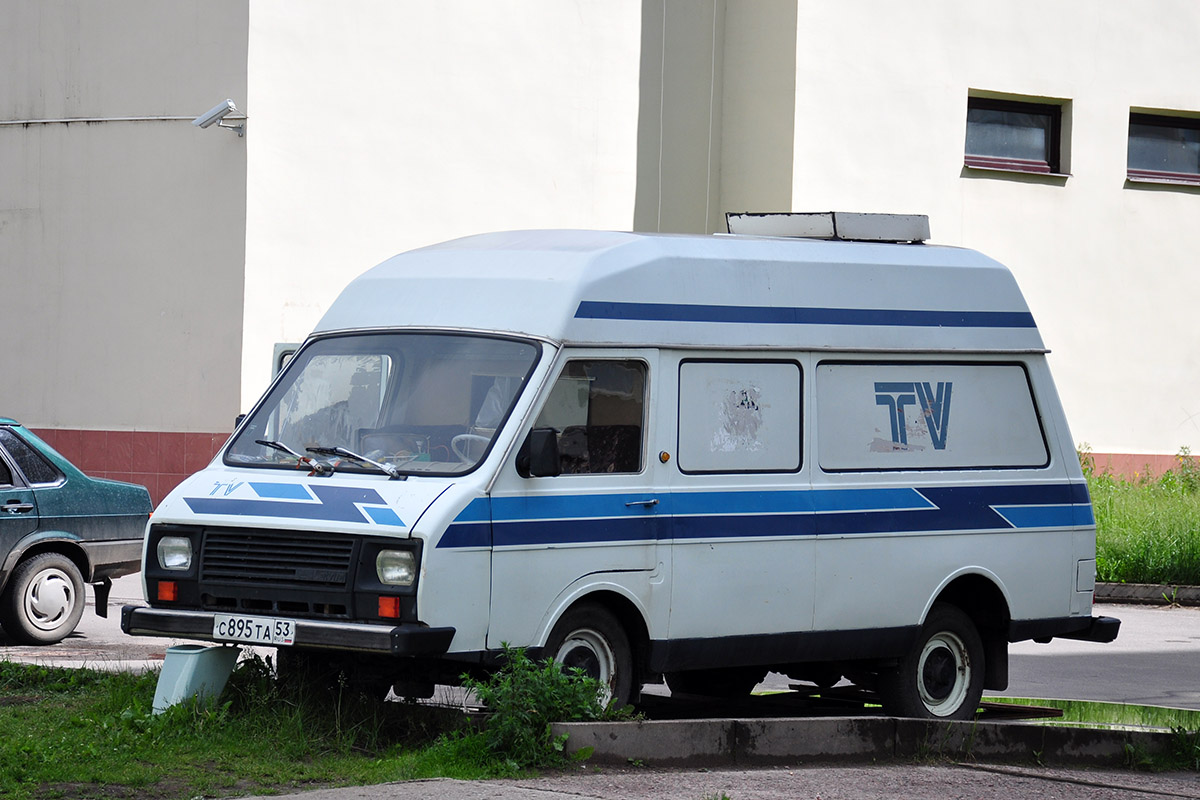
РАФ-22038-021

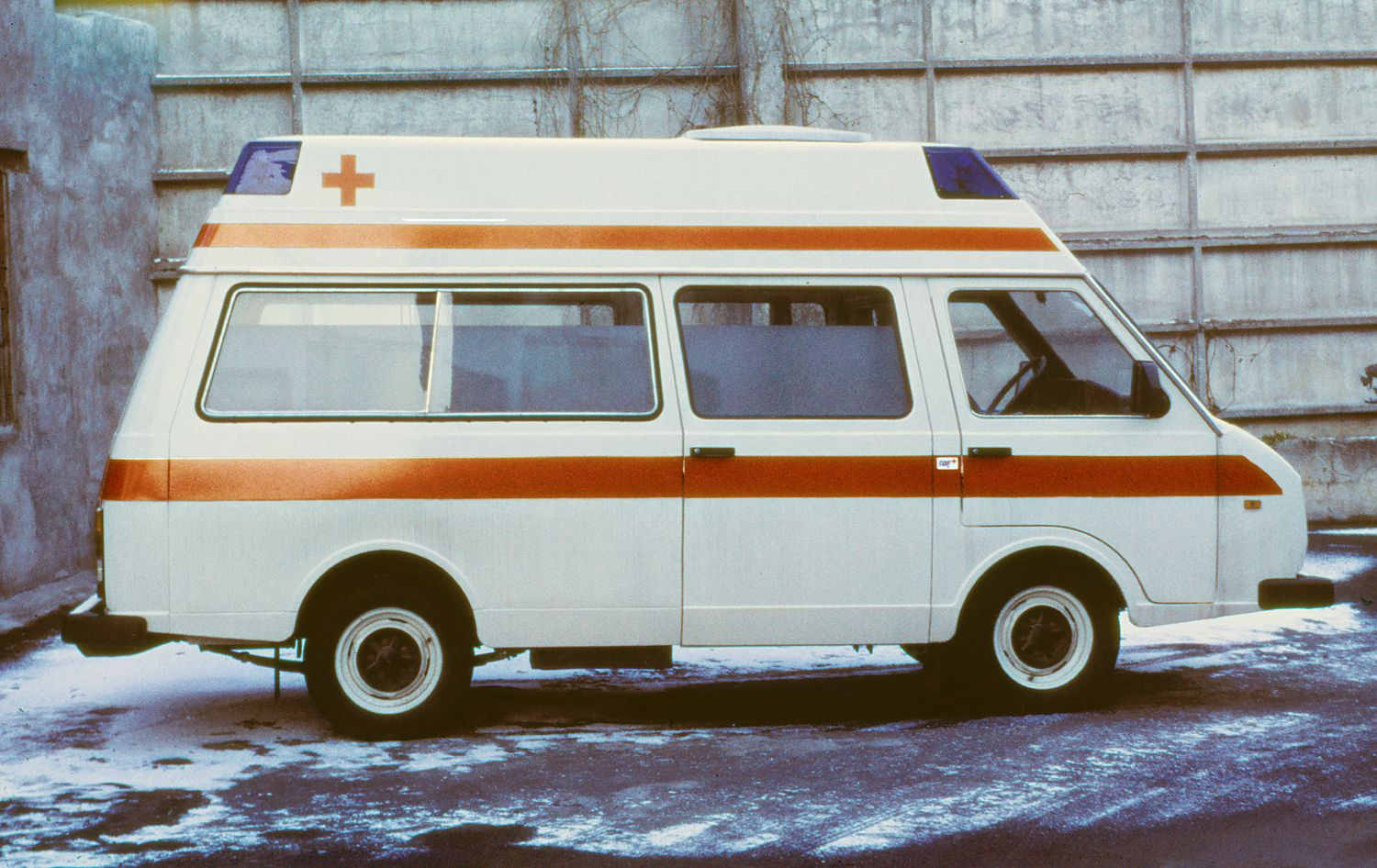
RAF-2914

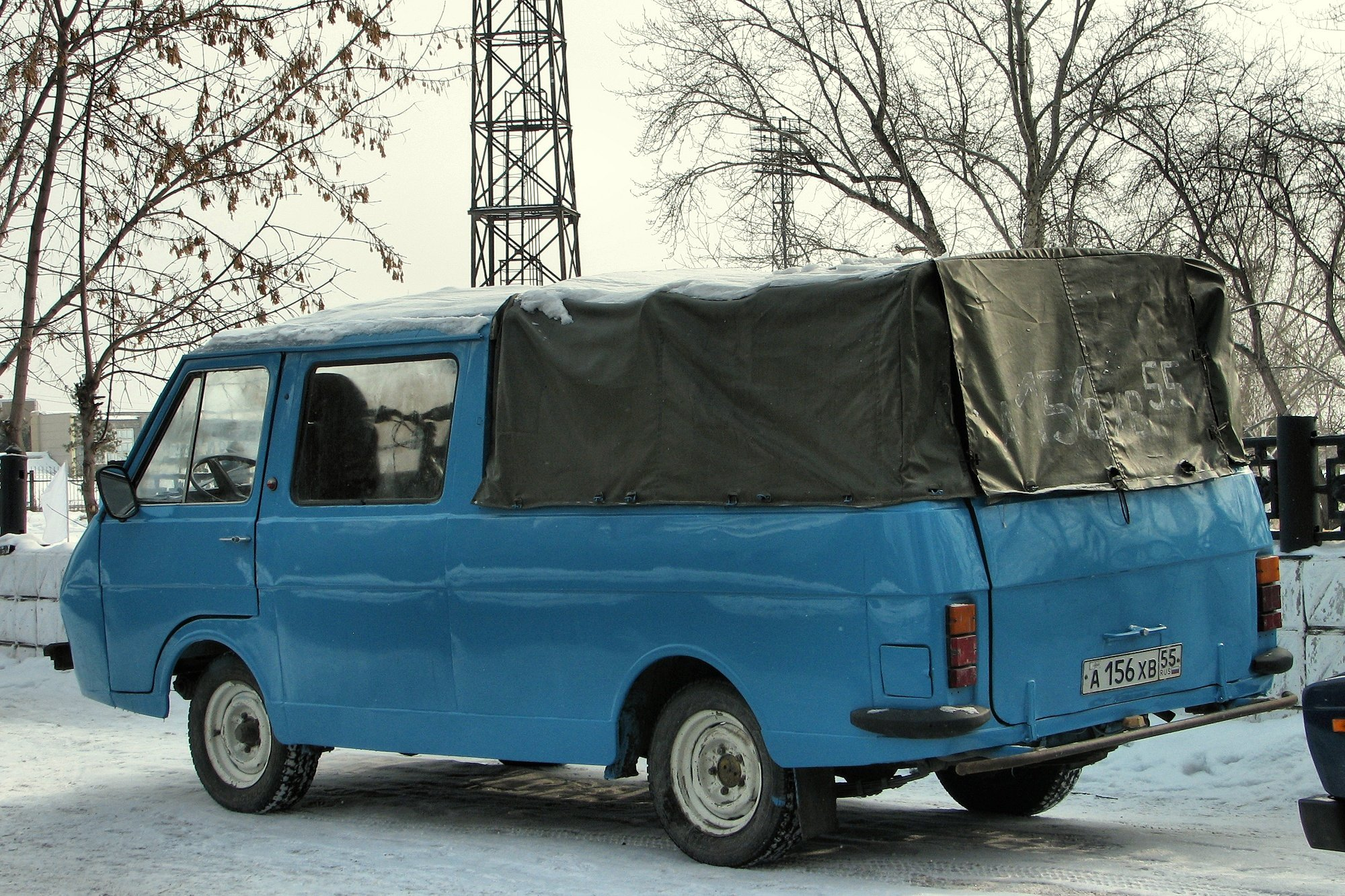
RAF-2909

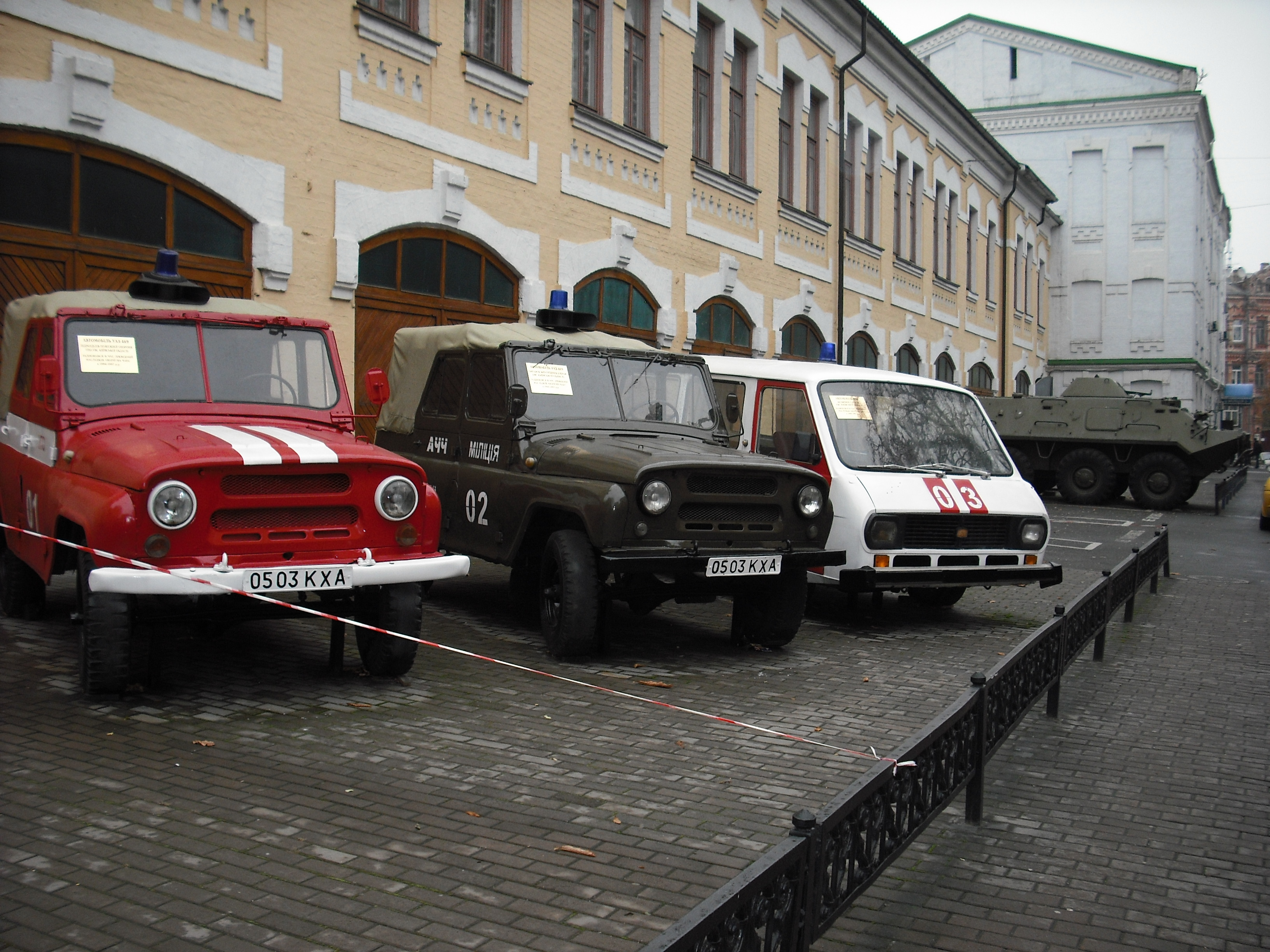
RAF-2203 (far right) that was used during the liquidation procedure of the Chernobyl Disaster

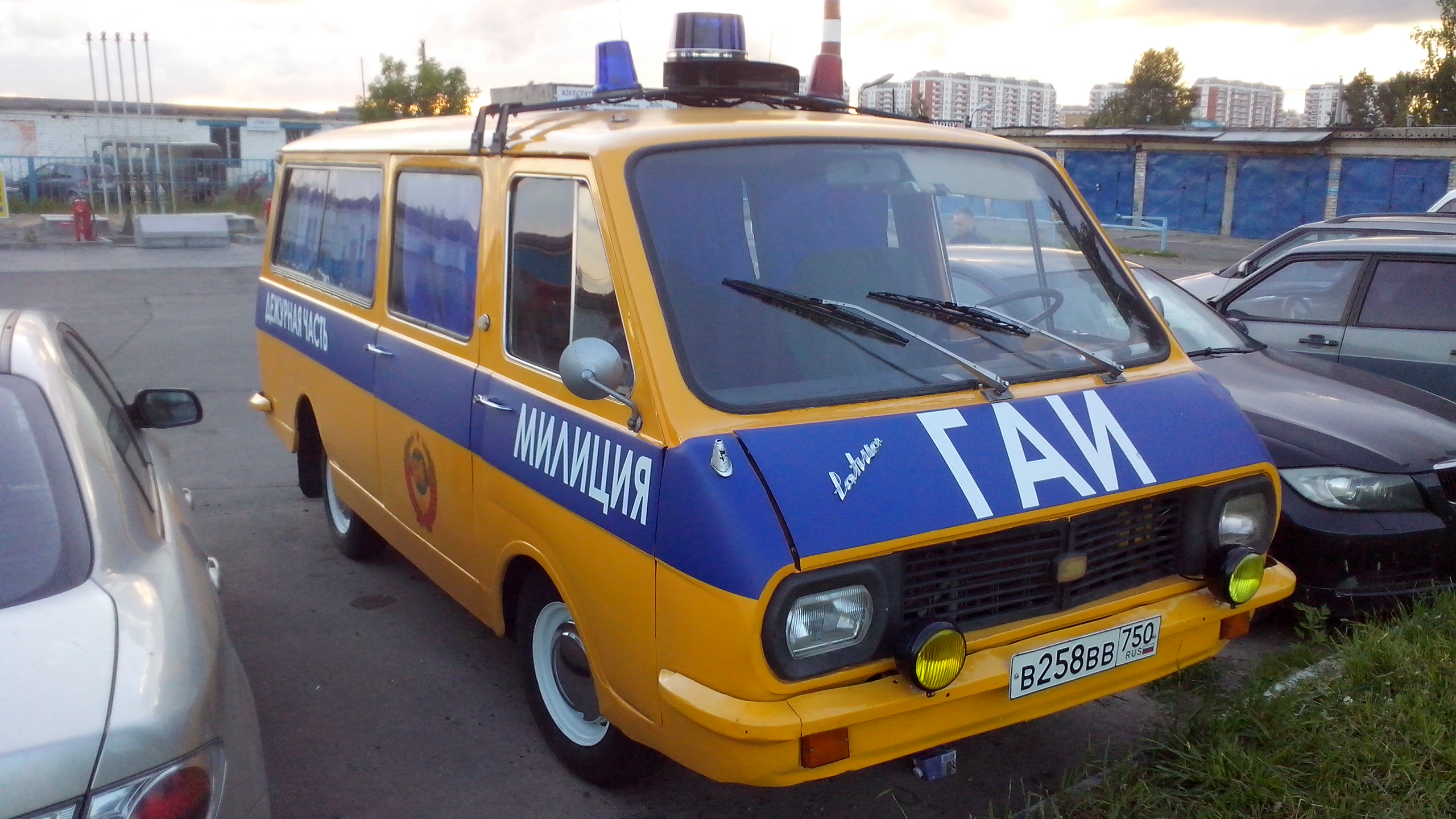
RAF-2203

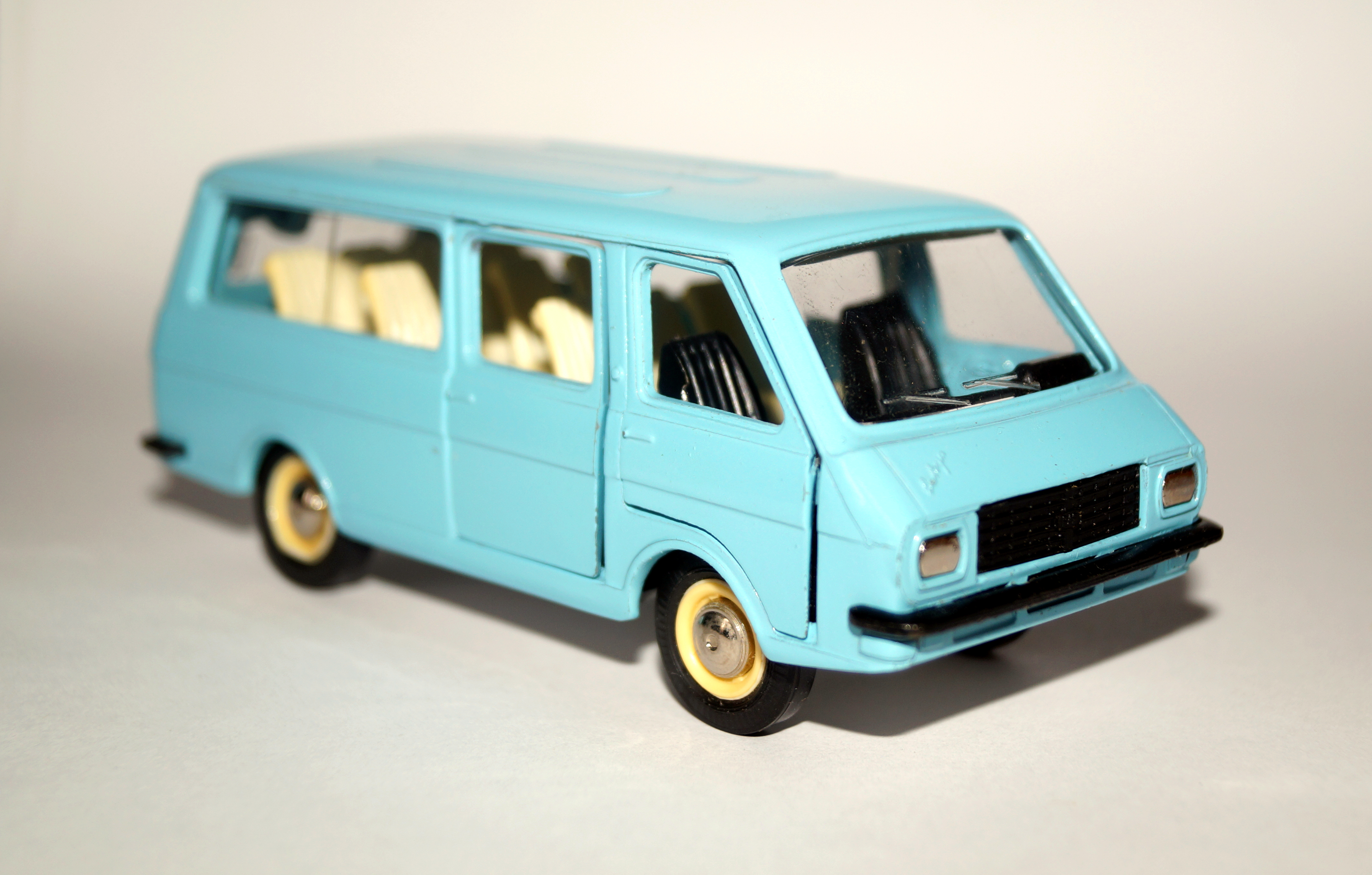
RAF-2203 1:43 die-cast toy
