= RAF-977 =

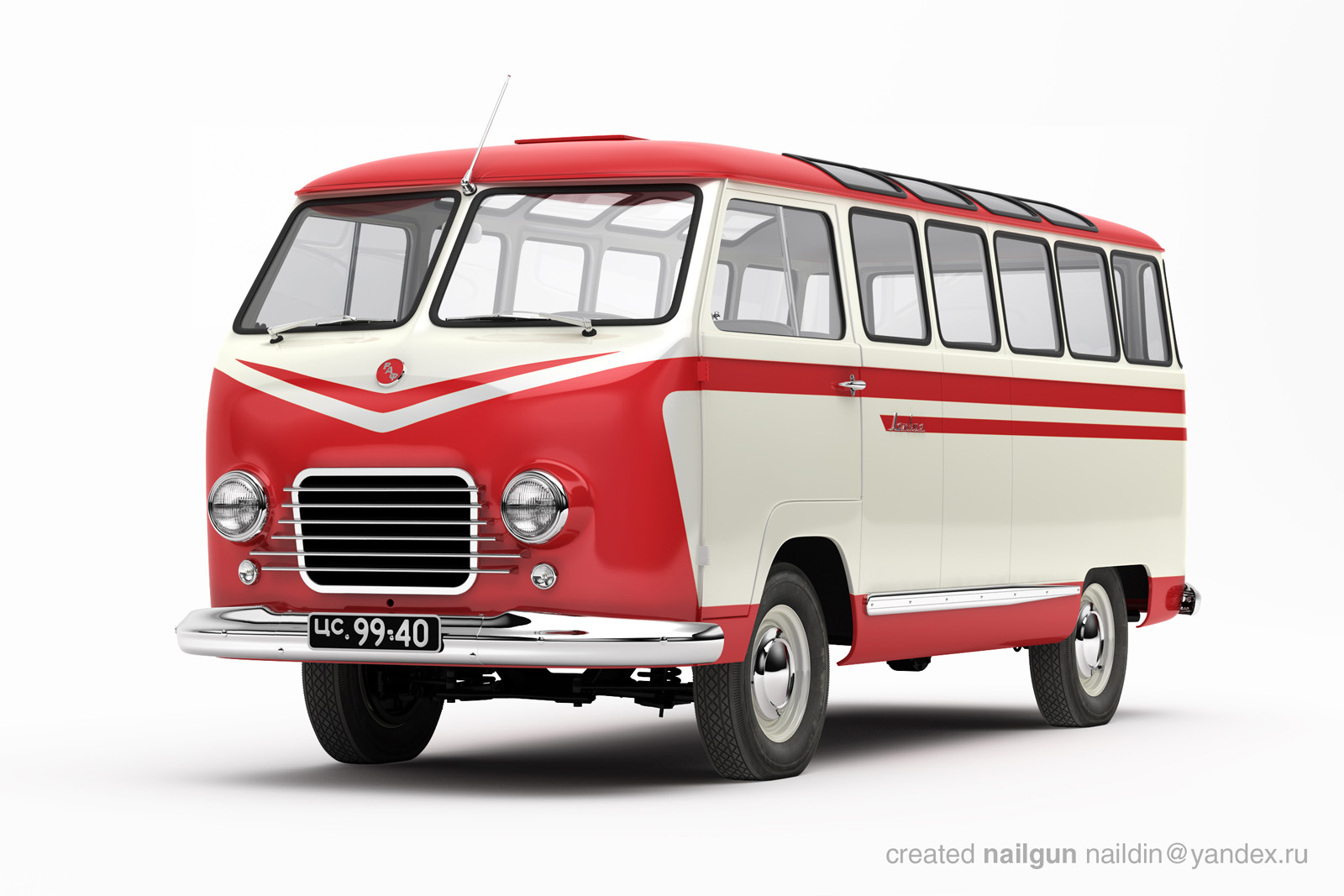
- RAF-977

Overview
- Manufacturer: Riga Autobus Factory
- Production: 1958-1976
- Assembly: RAF Factory, Jelgava, Latvia; ErAZ Factory, Yerevan, Armenia

Body and chassis
- Body style: 4-door, 10-passenger van/minibus/ambulance
- Related: GAZ-21 Volga; ErAZ-762

Powertrain
- Engine: 4-cylinder 2,445 cc (149.2 cu in) 75 hp (56 kW; 76 PS) at 4000rpm
- Transmission: 3-speed manual

Dimensions
- Wheelbase: 2,700 mm (106 in)
- Length: 4,900 mm (193 in)
- Width: 1,815 mm (71 in)
- Height: 2,110 mm (83 in)
- Curb weight: 1,675 kg (3,693 lb)

Chronology
- Successor: RAF-2203

The RAF-977 was a Soviet cabover van made by Riga Autobus Factory (RAF) based on components from the GAZ-21 Volga. It was introduced in 1958 and was manufactured in two main styles: a 10-seater minibus and an ambulance. In 1961, an updated version called the RAF-977D was put into production; this had a one-piece windshield, instead of the split, and Volga steering wheel among its other detail changes. Variants included the 977I ambulance and a special Intourist model, which had better seats, roof lights, and sunroof.

The RAF-983, based on the 977, was a fire department vehicle.

The shortened RAF-978, powered by the Moskvitch 407's 45 hp (34 kW; 46 PS) 1,360 cc (83 cu in) engine, was not a success, in part because the engine lacked torque, and ride quality suffered due to the shortened wheelbase.

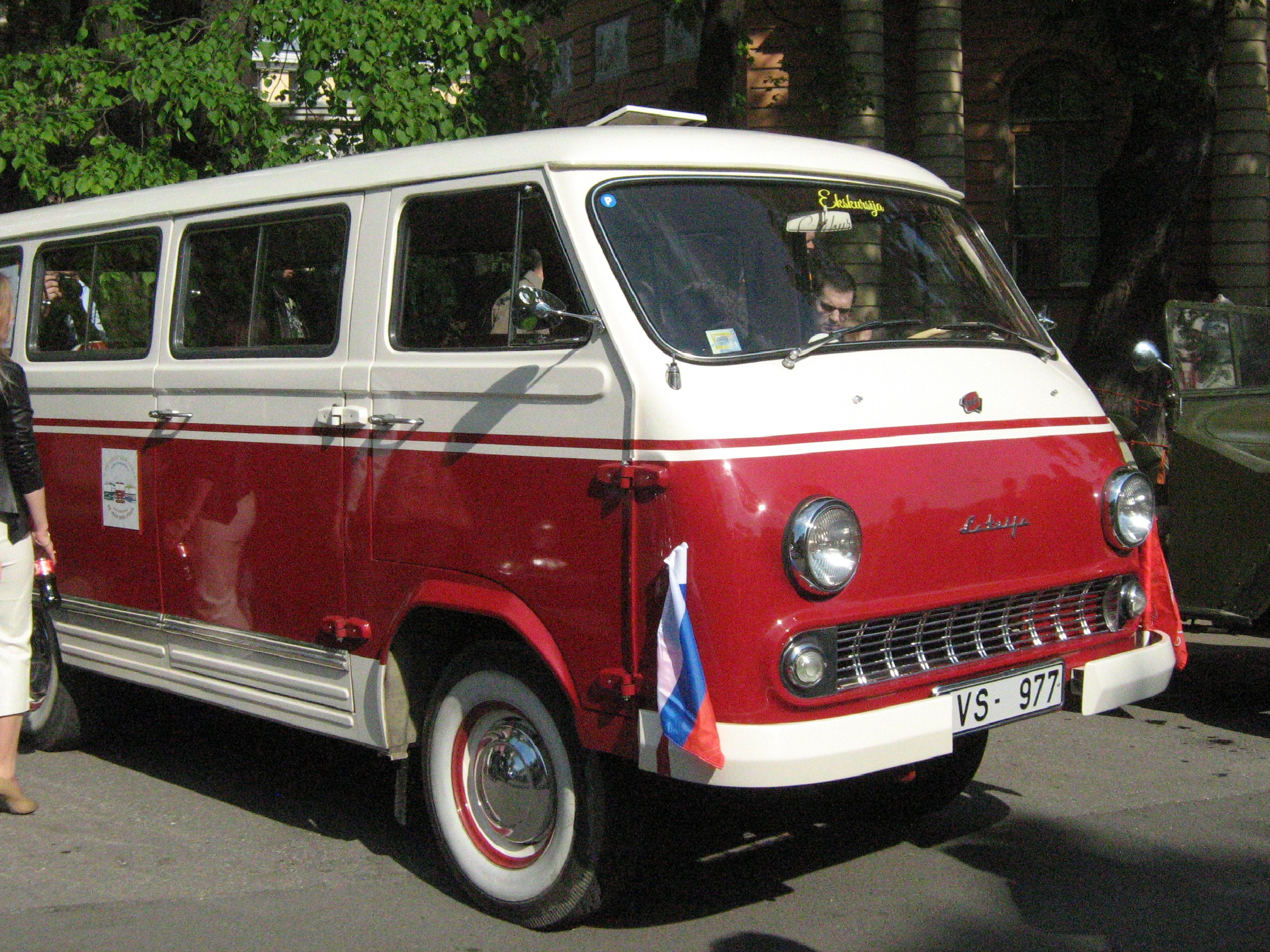
RAF-977DM

In 1969, it was replaced by the improved RAF-977DM. This had a wider passenger door and fewer but longer side windows (three on driver's side and two on passenger's, rather than five and three before). The ambulance now had the same number of windows, rather than fewer; it was now the RAF-977IM, and the tourist variant was the RAF-977EM.

A one-ton cargo panel van, the RAF-977K, was also developed, but due to insufficient assembly capacity (only 3000 units a year) at the RAF plant (which still used trolleys, rather than a modern assembly line), its production started at the ErAZ factory in Yerevan, Armenia, 1 May 1966 as ErAZ-762. This was nicknamed Yeraz (Armenian for "dream"). By 1973, ErAZ's production reached 6,500 per year; with the innovation of overhead carriage, capacity almost doubled, to 12,000 a year. The 977 was also produced under licence by Lugansk Avto Remontnyi Zavod (LARZ).

In 1969, an improved ErAZ-762A also appeared.

Production of the RAF-977 ceased in 1975, when it was replaced by RAF-2203 Latvia.

The RAF-977 was never promoted for export nor made available except to state groups.
