= Riga Autobus Factory =

Manufacturer of vans and minibuses under the brand name Latvija

Riga Autobus Factory (RAF)
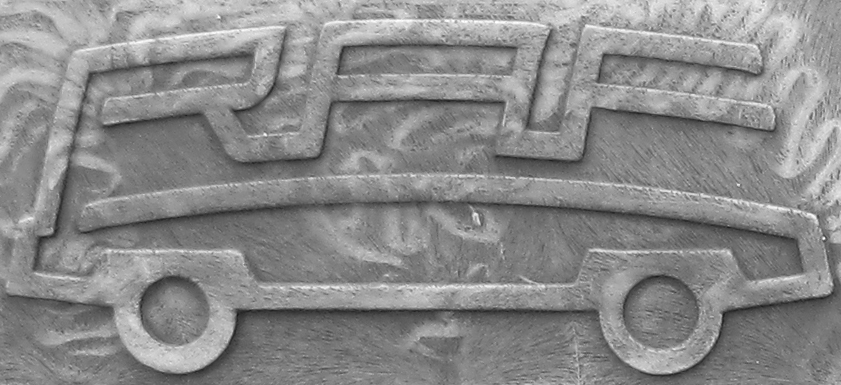
- Founded: 1949
- Defunct: 1998
- Headquarters: Riga, Latvia (formerly Soviet Union)
- Products: Buses and vans

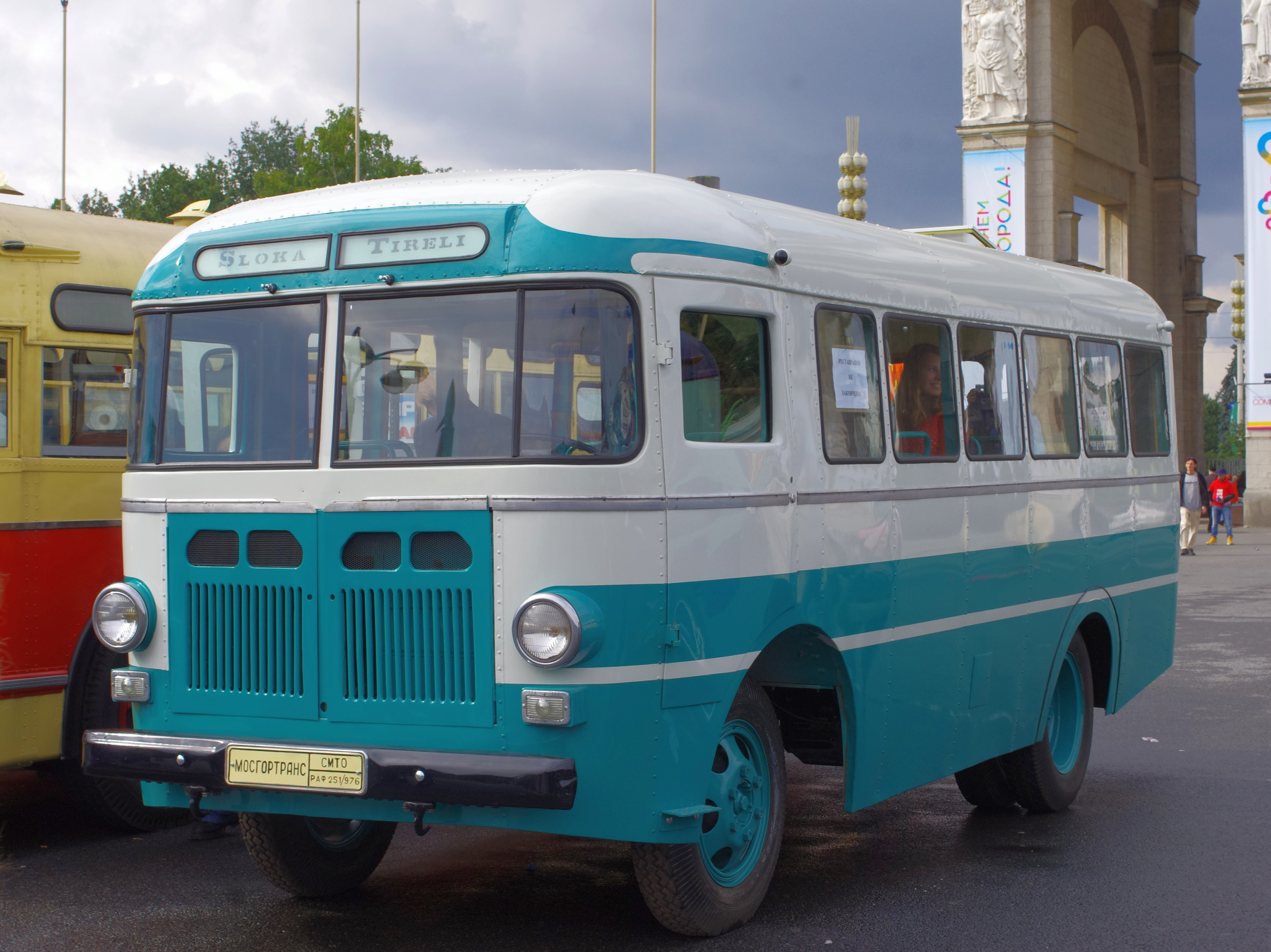
RAF-251 bus

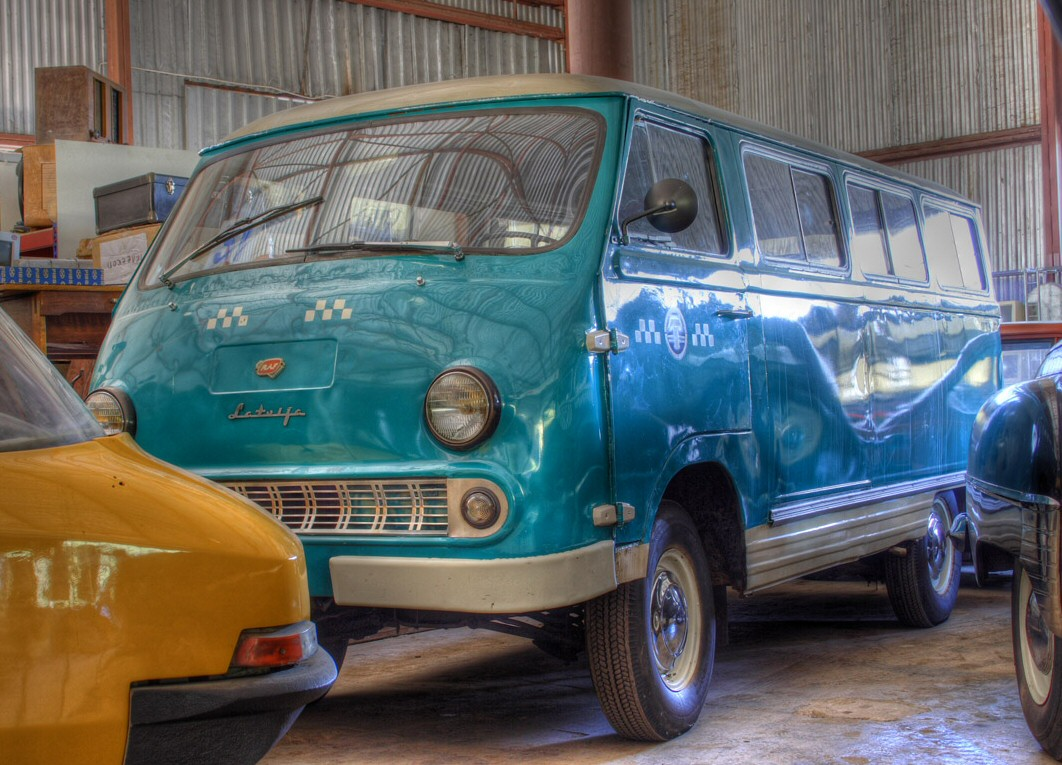
RAF-977 minibus

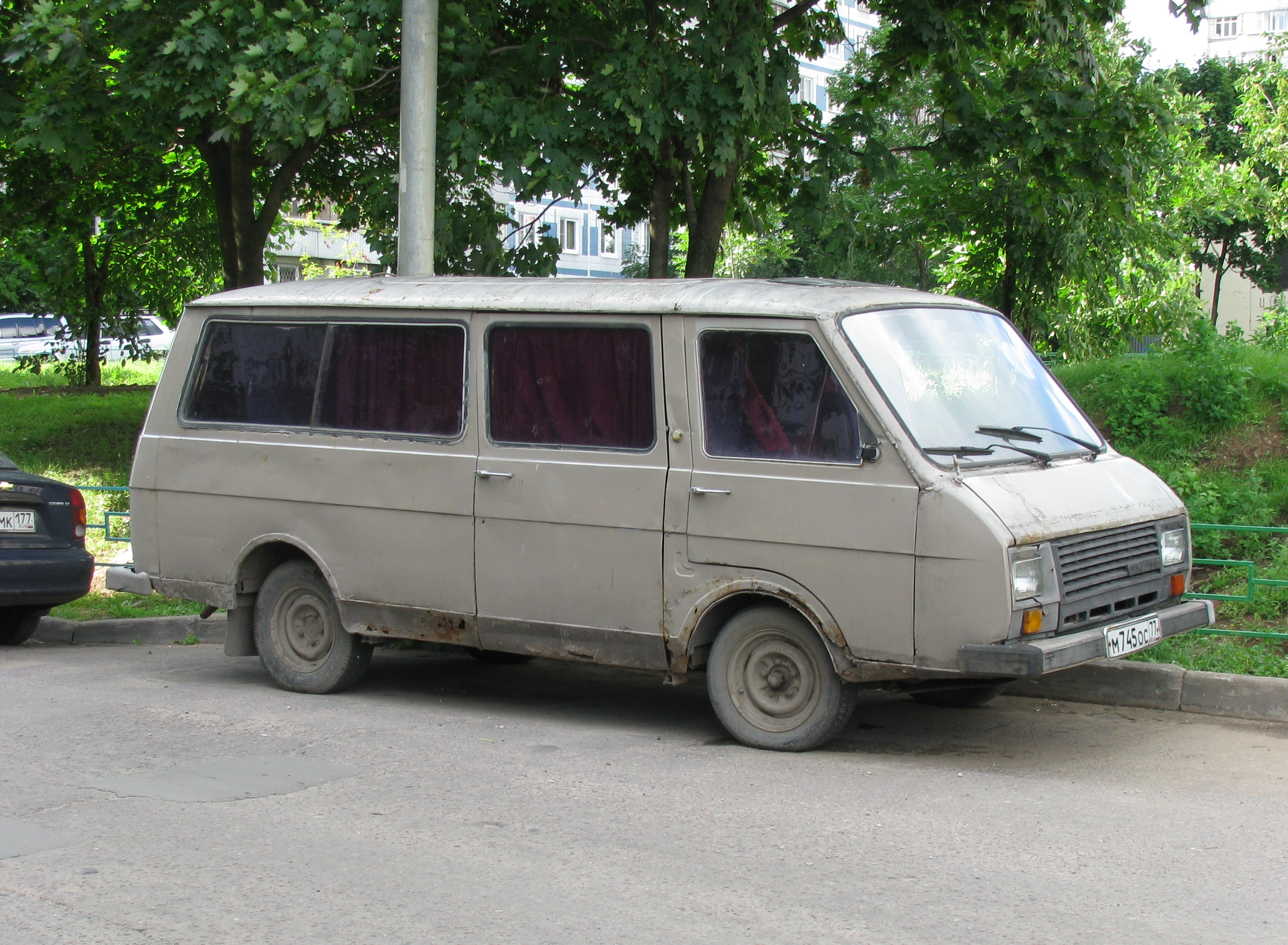
RAF-2203 Latvija

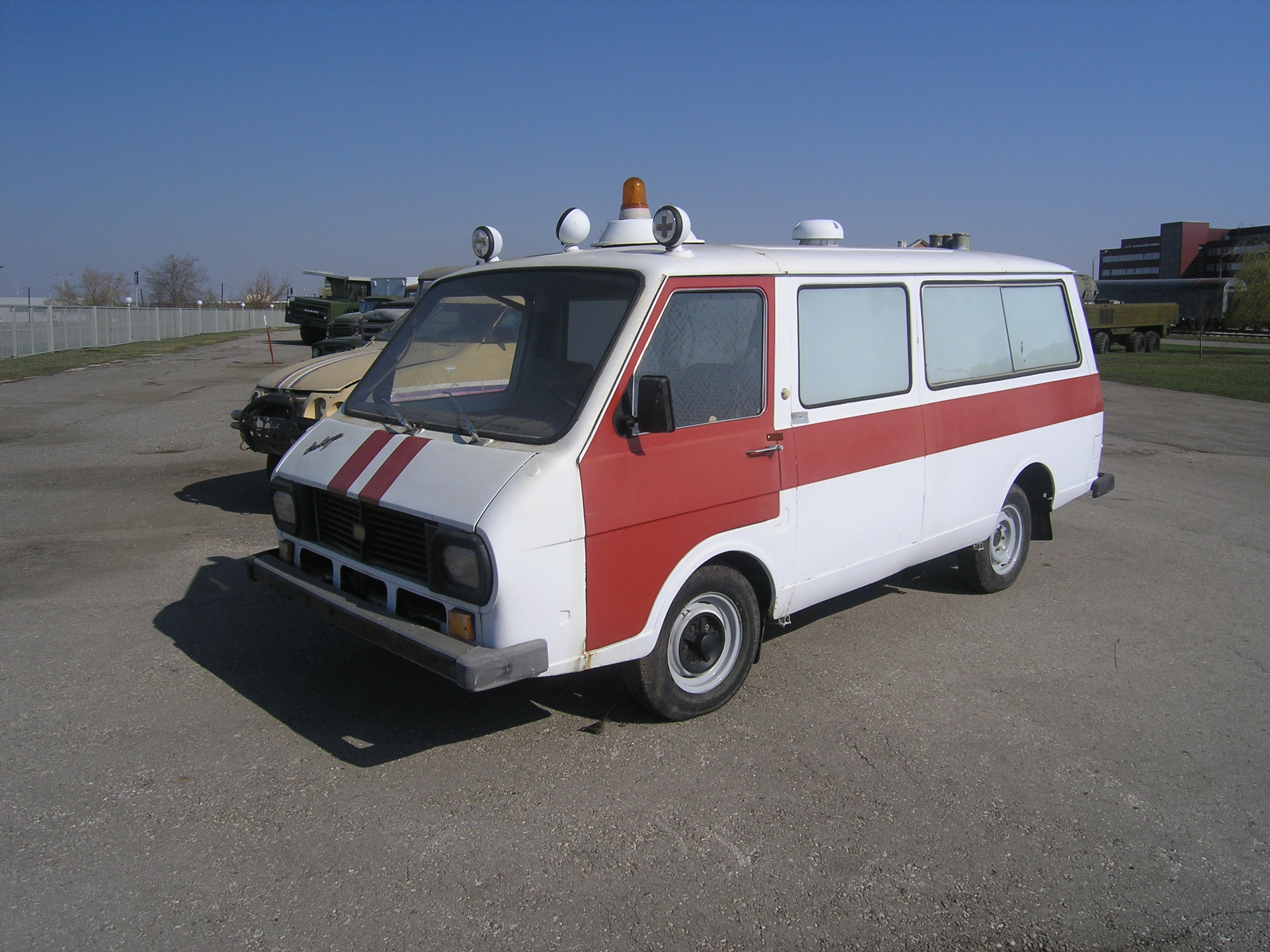
RAF-22031-01 ambulance

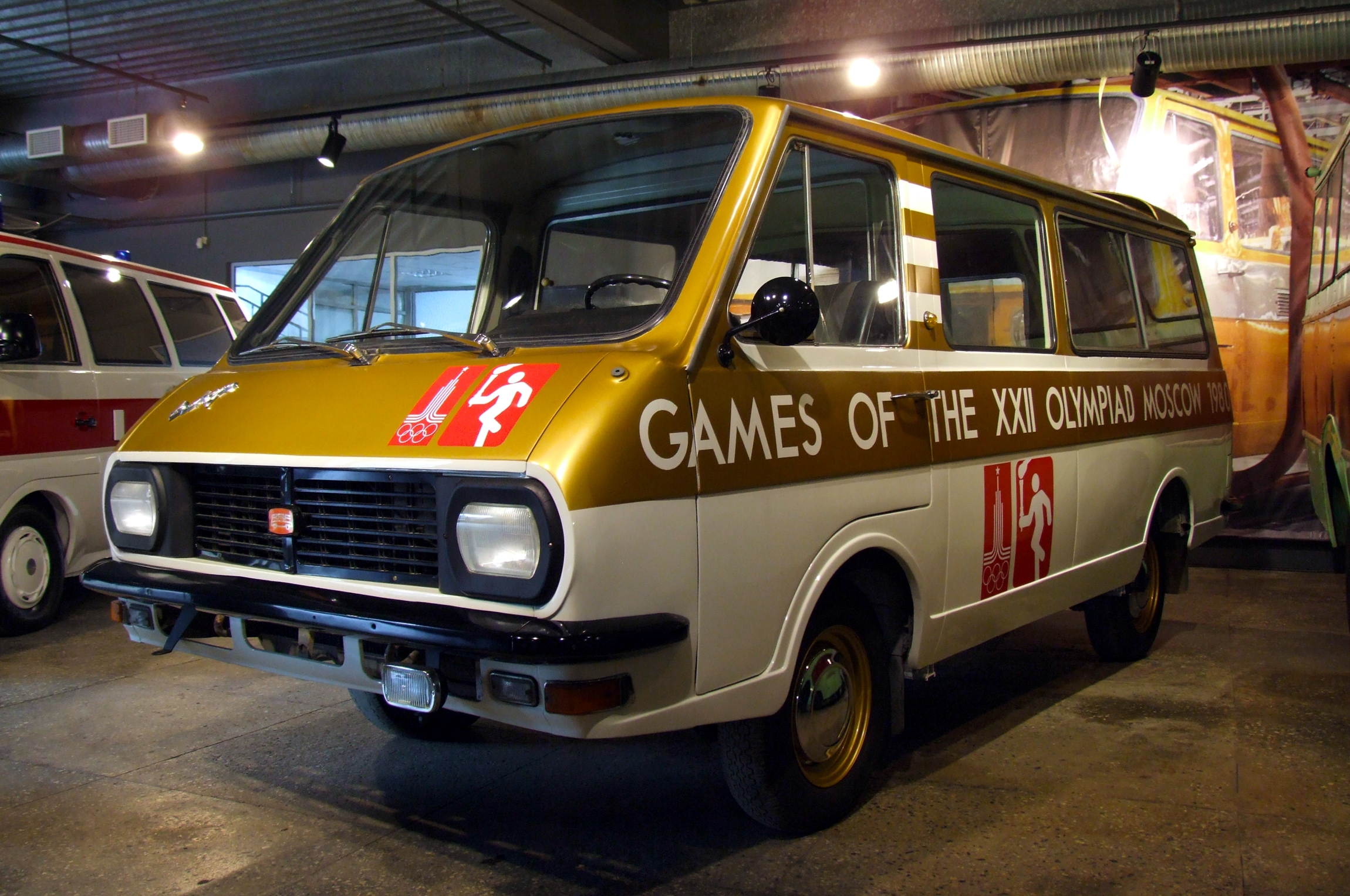
RAF-2907 (special edition for the 1980 Summer Olympics in Moscow)

The Riga Autobus Factory (RAF; Latvian: Rīgas autobusu fabrika) was a factory in Jelgava, Latvia, making vans and minibuses under the brand name Latvija.

== History ==
=== Origins, Riga period ===
During the Soviet period, RAF and UAZ were the only producers of vans and minibuses in the Soviet Union. RAF vans and minibuses were used only by state enterprises, most often as ambulances and for public transit. Private persons were not allowed to own them, the only exception being for families with at least five children.

In 1949, the factory began producing van bodies on the site of the Riga auto repair factory No.2 (commonly known as RARZ). In 1955, it was renamed the Riga Experimental Bus Factory (Latvian: Rīgas eksperimentālā autobusu fabrika, Russian: Рижский Опытный Автобусный Завод), and the products started to be abbreviated to RAF. It became the main Soviet producer of minibuses.

RAF's first product was the RAF-251, a 22-seat local bus, based on the GAZ-51 chassis (which RAF also built), with a wood and metal body. There was also a passenger and freight version (Kombi), the 251T, with a payload of 14 passengers and 800 kg (1,800 lb) cargo.

From 1958, the factory started to produce RAF-977 minibuses, based on GAZ-21 Volga engine (between the front seats, rather like the Dodge A100; the engine was accessible through an inside hatch), transmission, axles, and steering. It was planned to produce passenger ("route taxis" for airports, and for sporting teams), freight, mail, and ambulance versions of the vehicle, to replace the modified estates then in use. Drawing inspiration from the VW Type 2, it had a front-mounted water-cooled 2,445 cc (149.2 cu in) engine (based on the Volga's, with a lower compression ratio), and seated ten. It debuted in 1957, and ten were built for display at that year's Moscow Youth Festival, leading to a proposed name Festival. The first batch was produced in 1959, under the new RAF 977 name. It got 13 L/100 km (18 mpg_{‑US}; 22 mpg_{‑imp}) and could reach 62 mph (100 km/h), the majority of those being hand-built.

In 1965, RAF proposed two prototypes, with the hope of persuading Minavtoprom to finance a new factory: a conventional version, comparable to the Ford Transit (dubbed the RAF 962-I), or a forward control version, similar to the Renault Estafette (dubbed the 962-II). RAF management, in a rare move for a Soviet company, created two competing teams to individually design a new van. The conventional 962-I was selected, which seemed less likely to provide the money for an all-new facility. So RAF tried to persuade the selection committee to adopt the more radical 962-II, and did.

A one-tonne variant was based on a modernized 977D chassis. However, the factory size was not large enough to put this model into mass production, and therefore it was moved to ErAZ (Yerevan, Armenia).

=== Move to Jelgava, decline and collapse ===
Construction of a new factory in Jelgava (to build the new 962-II, now known as the RAF-2203 Latvia) was begun on 25 July 1969, and finished in February 1976. It was designed to produce 17,000 vehicles per year. The factory produced several versions of the RAF-2203, which was widely sold in the Soviet Union and exported, mainly to Socialist bloc and aligned nations.

The massive factory created profound challenges for Soviet-occupied Latvia. During its planning, local economists warned that the project was unfeasible in the long term, but were ignored by the Soviet government. Due to a lack of local manpower, workers from all around the Soviet Union were brought to Jelgava, increasing the already high levels of immigration and putting strain on local infrastructure and the ethnic relations between Latvians and the mostly Russian-speaking newcomers. The proportion of Latvians living in Jelgava shrank from 80% to less than 50% during the Soviet times. An entirely new neighbourhood of Jelgava, bearing the RAF name, was built.

In addition, even with the imported workforce, the factory suffered from a lack of qualified manpower: engineers (later on, also conscript soldiers of the Soviet Army) were made to work on the production line. Quality issues were rampant and well-known; on some days, all of the manufactured vehicles turned out to be defective. Even the large factory, in the end, turned out to be too small (with a planned yearly output of just 12,000 cars per year) to install important machinery, slowing down production. A heavy blow for the factory came during Perestroika – around 1986, the factory was stripped of the State quality mark of the USSR. In 1987, the factory organized one of the first open management contests in the USSR, with Viktor Bossert from Omsk elected as director by the factory workers. Bossert tried to improve quality, even announcing a competition with Renault's Trafic van, but couldn't overcome the ineffective supply chain of the Soviet planned economy and the lack of incentive and competition due to guaranteed tenders from the Gossnab. He left the factory in 1990.

By the beginning of the 1990s, the RAF-2203 was completely outdated and the factory set about designing a new model. The original plan was to build a new RAF vehicle to be called the M1 "Roksana”, designed with help from the British consultancy International Automotive Developments. The model was successfully displayed at several auto salons, but never got further than a prototype. The same thing happened to the front-wheel drive 1994 RAF M2 'Stils' (“Style”) microbus.

After the collapse of the USSR, the new borders broke the supply chains and production fell drastically. An investment proposal came from the Russian GAZ company, but it was rejected by the Latvian government, which considered Russian capital a threat to Latvian independence. Although some Western and East Asian investors also showed their interest in RAF, all of them considered this investment too risky as the local economy was too small to support large production and the Russian market was virtually closed due to the volatile Russian economy and a complicated political relationship between Russia and Latvia. The large factory, largely dependent on parts and materials brought from outside Latvia, required a lot of resources for its maintenance and was described by some investors as the only valuable asset of the factory. Another blow was the popularity of the Russian GAZelle van, unveiled in 1994.

In 1997, the last batch of 13-seat RAF-22039s was released. The last automobile produced by the dying giant was the RAF-3311 — a hearse that could fit four bodies.

In 1998, RAF went bankrupt. The only part of the company that survived was RAF-Avia, a charter airline set up using the four airplanes owned by the plant. The 120,000 m^{2} (1,300,000 ft^{2}) manufacturing site, complete with machinery and land were purchased by SIA Baltiva, which was established in 2000, for 150 thousand lats. They considered selling it to a western automaker, but this proved unrealistic. As of 2002, the assembly shop was still in order and all the design documents existed, so production could be started again if there should be a need. ErAZ expressed interest, but probably only for the designs.

In 2005, SIA Baltiva was renamed SIA NP Jelgavas biznesa parks ('NP Jelgava Business Park'). Shortly after, the company's shares were transferred to Nordic Partners Properties Limited of the Nordic Partners Group, which was originally financed by the Icelandic businessman Gisli Reyninsson. On the estates purchased, NP Jelgavas biznesa parks developed an industrial park with a total area of 23 ha.

=== Legacy ===
Rumors came out in 2018 of RAF being revived, as SIA Rīgas Autobusu Fabrika, RAF was registered in the Latvian company database in August 2018, and was led by Ukrainian businessman Kyrylo Shumeiko. The company stated that they believed they would show off their first new model in 2019 and start production in 2020. It was also believed that the new RAF would focus on electric powered vehicles like vans and trolleybuses.

Shumeiko claimed that a prototype would be built in Vilnius, while the constructor work on the vehicles would take place at the Kharkiv National Automobile and Highway University (KhNADU). However, an investigation by the Russian-language news section of the Latvian channel LTV7 found out that none of the mentioned engineers at KhNADU had heard about the project. The author of sketches presented by Shumeiko was Svetlana Mirzoyan, who in the 1950s had designed the RAF-977; she responded that the sketches were made by her students, but that he was not authorised to use them. The new company had not informed Jelgava City Council or the business park at the former factory. Shumeiko later switched to consulting Ukrainian car importers on customs issues. The company was dissolved in July 2022.

Surviving prototypes of the plant are on display at the Riga Motor Museum, as well as production models in other institutions.

== Models ==
- RAF-251 - GAZ-51 based bus (1955–1958)
- RAF-8 - Moskvitch 407 based 8-passenger prototype bus (1957)
- RAF-10 - GAZ-M20 based 9-11-passenger bus (1957–1959)
- RAF-982 - experimental bus
- RAF-977 Latvija - GAZ-21 based 10-passenger van/bus/ambulance/taxi (1959–1976). Also made in D, DM and IM models.
- RAF-2203 Latvija - 4x2 4dr van (1976–1997)
  - RAF-2203 Latvija (delivery) - 4x2 4dr delivery van
  - RAF-2203 Latvija (cardiology) - 4x2 4dr cardiac ambulance
  - RAF-2203 Latvija (fire) - 4x2 4dr fire minivan
  - RAF-2203 Latvija GAI - 4x2 4dr police van
  - RAF-2203 Latvija (mail) - 4x2 4dr mail van
  - RAF-2203 Latvija (taxi) - 4x2 4dr taxi van
  - RAF-2203 Latvija VAI - 4x2 4dr military police van
  - RAF-22031 Latvija - 4x2 4dr ambulance
  - RAF-2907 - special car for Summer Olympic in Moscow
  - RAF-2914 - 4x2 ambulance van
  - RAF-3311 Latvija - 4x2 pickup on RAF-2203 chassis
  - RAF-33111 Latvija - 4x2 light truck on RAF-2203 chassis
  - RAF Latvija - collector - 4x2 cash collector on RAF-2203 chassis
  - RAF Latvija - tourist van, motor home
- RAF M1 'Roksana' Prototype minivan (1991)
- RAF M2 'Stils' Prototype minivan (1994)
