= GAZ-3105 =

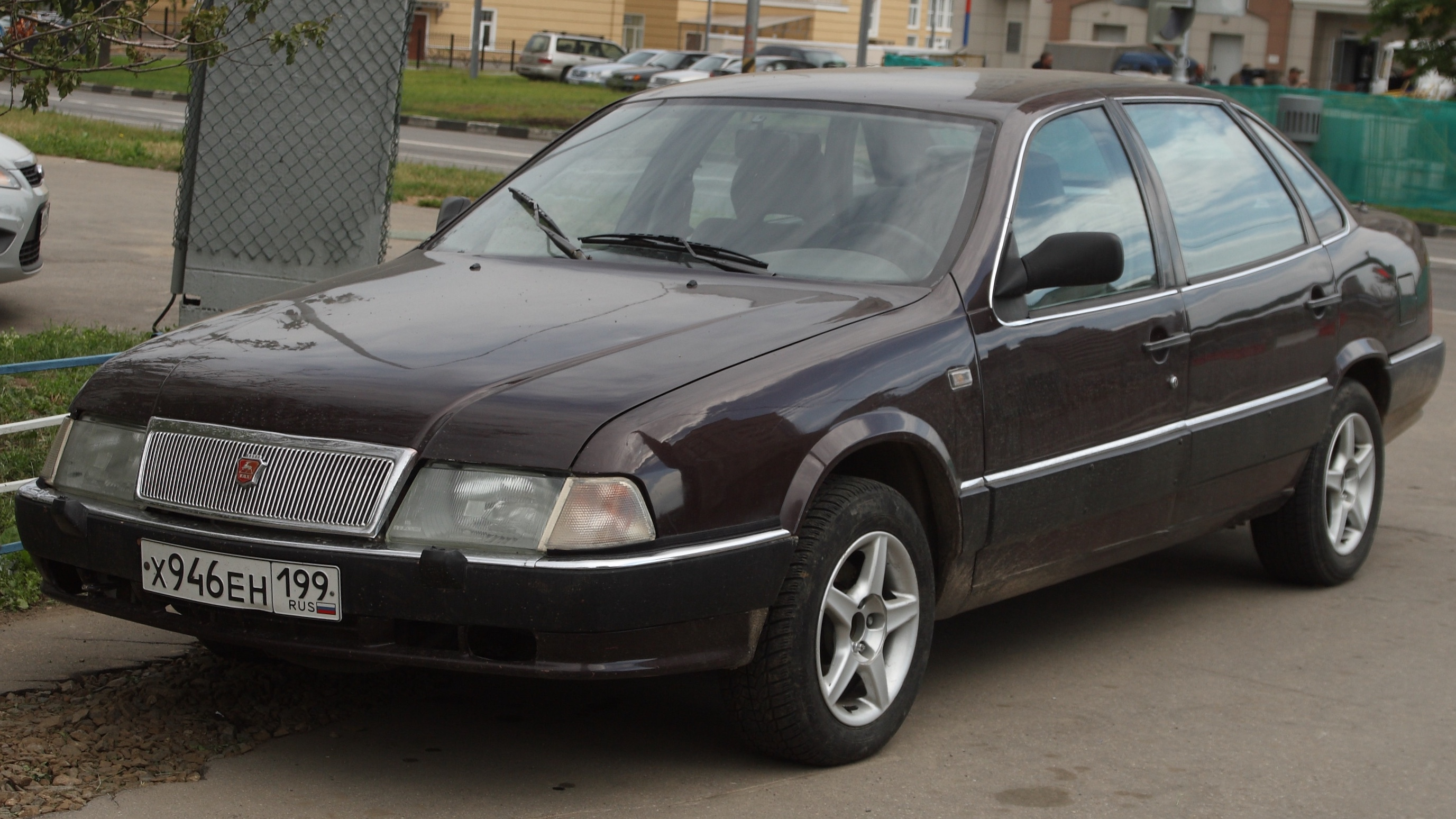

Overview
- Manufacturer: GAZ
- Production: 1992–1996
- Assembly: Russia: Nizhny Novgorod

Body and chassis
- Class: Full-size luxury car
- Layout: FR layout
- Related: Audi 100

Dimensions
- Wheelbase: 2,870 mm (113 in)
- Length: 5,050 mm (198.8 in)
- Width: 1,980 mm (78 in)
- Height: 1,430 mm (56.3 in)
- Curb weight: 1,635 kg (3604 lb)

Chronology
- Predecessor: GAZ-3102; GAZ-14
- Successor: GAZ-3111

The GAZ-3105, often referred as a Volga, is an automobile manufactured by the Gorkovsky Avtomobilny Zavod (GAZ, Gorky Automobile Plant) from 1992 to 1996.

== History ==
In the 1980s, GAZ was looking for a new and modern vehicle to replace the aging executive car GAZ-3102, but also the larger GAZ-14 Chaika limousine. For this reason, GAZ began to develop a new family of vehicles with front, rear and all-wheel drive, the models were named GAZ-3103, GAZ-3104 and GAZ-3105 depending on the version.

The design was partly derived from the third-generation Audi 100/200, from which the cross-section of the body along the B-pillar, the transmission arrangement, and some other mechanical designs were used. However, since it was much smaller and slightly less powerful than the GAZ-14, it was placed between the GAZ-3102 and the GAZ-14 in GAZ's product lineup. Compared to the Volga series vehicles derived from the GAZ-24 (GAZ-3102, GAZ-31029, GAZ-3110 and GAZ-31105), the GAZ-3105 had a completely new body and few internal components in common with them. The vehicles featured MacPherson strut suspension, V8 engine with fuel injection, and CV front and rear axles. The GAZ-3103 was the base model with front-wheel drive and a 4-cylinder 2.3 liter engine from the GAZ-3102, while the GAZ-3104 had rear-wheel drive, and the GAZ-3105 was the luxury variant. The GAZ-3103 and GAZ-3104 were intended to replace the GAZ-3102, while the GAZ-3105 was intended to replace the Chaika. The first prototypes were on the road in 1987. The GAZ-3103, 3104, and 3105 was slightly larger than the older Volgas and due to the Audi-derived chassis it had it was much more modern, safe, and had a more robust structure, as proven in a crash test.

Due to many economic problems at GAZ, development was stopped several times, and finally in 1992 only production of the GAZ-3105 began, while the other cheaper variants were abandoned. Even after the start of production, the economic situation in post-Soviet Russia made sales difficult, and in the end only 55 vehicles were produced. Nevertheless, GAZ tried to produce a second generation of the GAZ-3105 and presented a modernized prototype at the 1996 Moscow Motor Show. The project was eventually abandoned in favor of the GAZ-3111 Volga, which was equally unsuccessful.

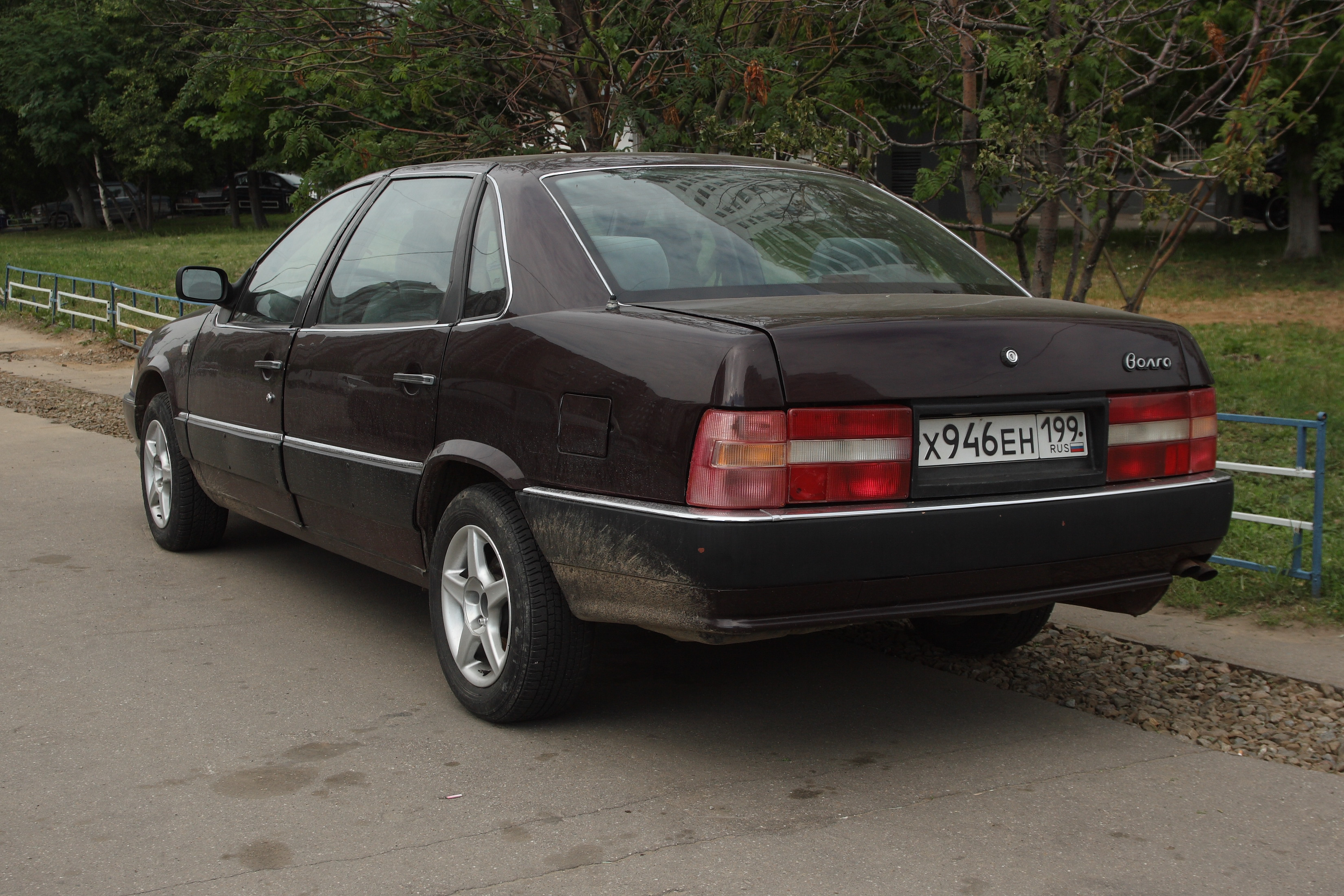
GAZ-3105 Volga (1992–1996) rear
