= GAZ-3102 =

GAZ-3102 Volga
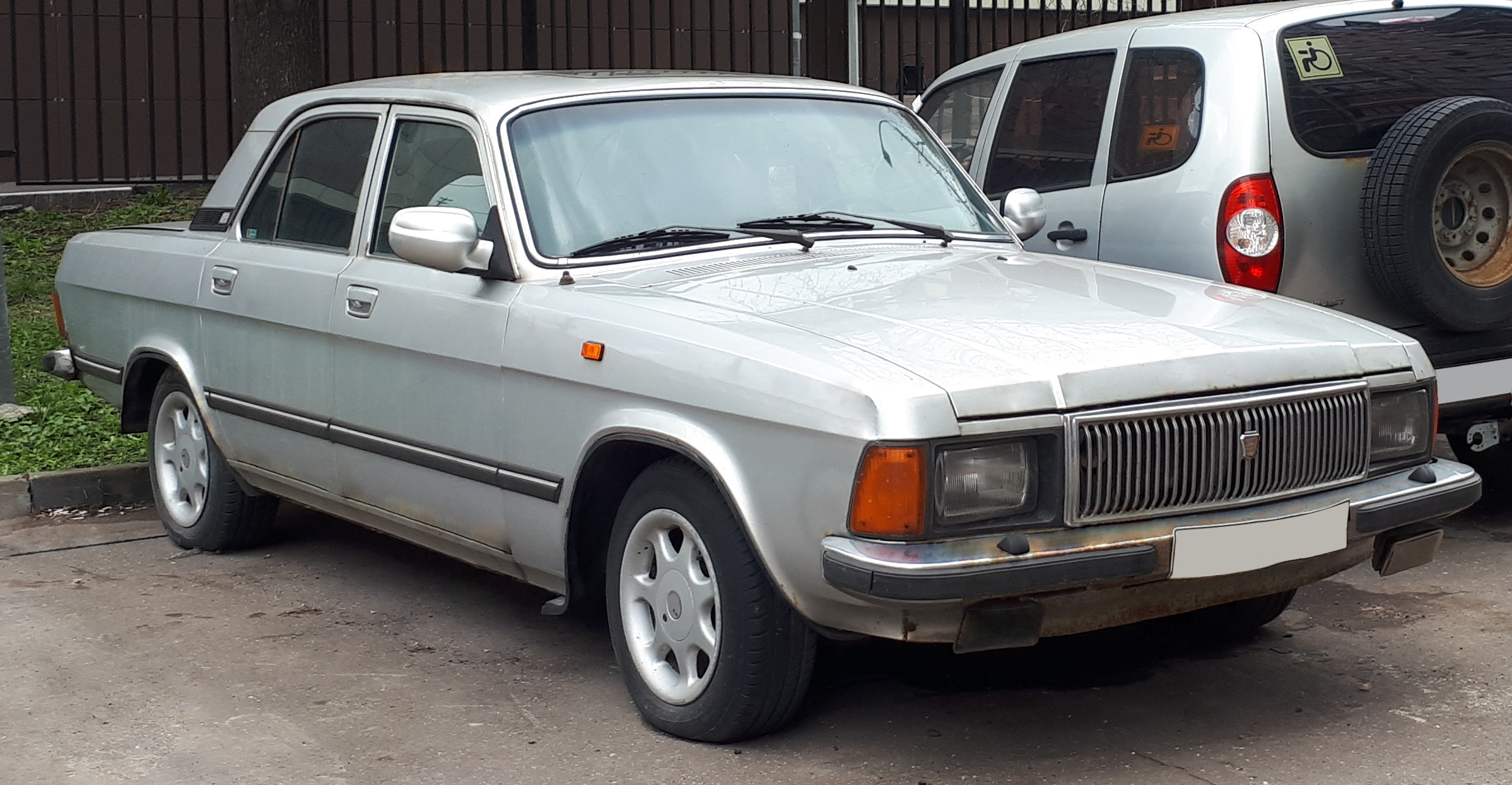

Overview
- Manufacturer: GAZ
- Production: 1982–2009
- Assembly: Soviet Union / Russia: Gorky (Nizhny Novgorod)

Body and chassis
- Class: Mid-size luxury car
- Body style: 4-door saloon/sedan
- Related: GAZ-31105

Powertrain
- Engine: 2.3 L ZMZ-4062.10 I4; 2.5 L ZMZ-402.10/4021.10/4022.10 I4; 5.5 L ZMZ 503.10 V8 (GAZ-31011); 5.5 L ZMZ 505.10 V8 (GAZ-31013)
- Transmission: 4-speed manual (1982–1997); 5-speed manual (1997–2009); 4-speed Aisin Warner automatic (2007–2009)

Dimensions
- Wheelbase: 2,800 mm (110.2 in)
- Length: 4,960 mm (195.3 in)
- Width: 1,820 mm (71.7 in)
- Height: 1,476 mm (58.1 in)
- Curb weight: 1,455 kg (3,210 lb)

Chronology
- Predecessor: GAZ-24-10 Volga
- Successor: GAZ-3105; GAZ-3110

The GAZ-3102 Volga is an automobile manufactured by the Gorkovsky Avtomobilny Zavod (GAZ, Gorky Automobile Plant) from 1982 to 2009 as a generation of its Volga marque.

== GAZ-3101 prototype ==
In 1976, the first prototypes were shown and under the new Soviet automobile numbering system, the car was christened as the GAZ-3101. Visually the vehicle included a completely new fascia, reminiscent of the more muscular fashion of North America, framed by East German built square headlights with water jet washers, a more angular chromed bumper with resin lining, fog lamps suspended below and the trademark "Baleen" grille. At the same time, conservative European influence can also be traced in the new rear panels, with a large tail-light cluster. As a measure of additional security, the fuel tank migrated behind the rear seat from its position under the boot, allowing the spare wheel to occupy its space. From the side, GAZ-24's profile remained, but doors now void of quarter glasses and featured sunken door handles in accordance to new standards of passive safety to pedestrians. Although the traditional chrome door mounted mirrors were retained, a provision was made for internal adjustment.

Inside, the vehicle had a completely new interior, with headrests on all seats, a new polyurethane coated dashboard with integrated instrument clusters and steering column controls for windscreen wipers/washers and indicator/high beam lights, rear window heater and other features. Chassis-wise the vehicle featured a vacuum servo assisted split-contour braking system, front disc brakes, radial tyres and "aerodynamic" hub caps. The prototypes were powered by a 2990 cc GAZ-24-14 V6 with a cast iron cylinder block originally developed for the GAZ-24, and the identical GAZ-24-18, with an aluminium block. Both engines produced 136 hp, but the latter was much lighter in weight. The shown GAZ-3101 prototypes also featured automatic transmission, power steering, electric windows and air conditioning. Like its predecessors, the prototypes took part in much publicised tours of the USSR, and GAZ was ready to begin its pre-conveyor batches in 1978.

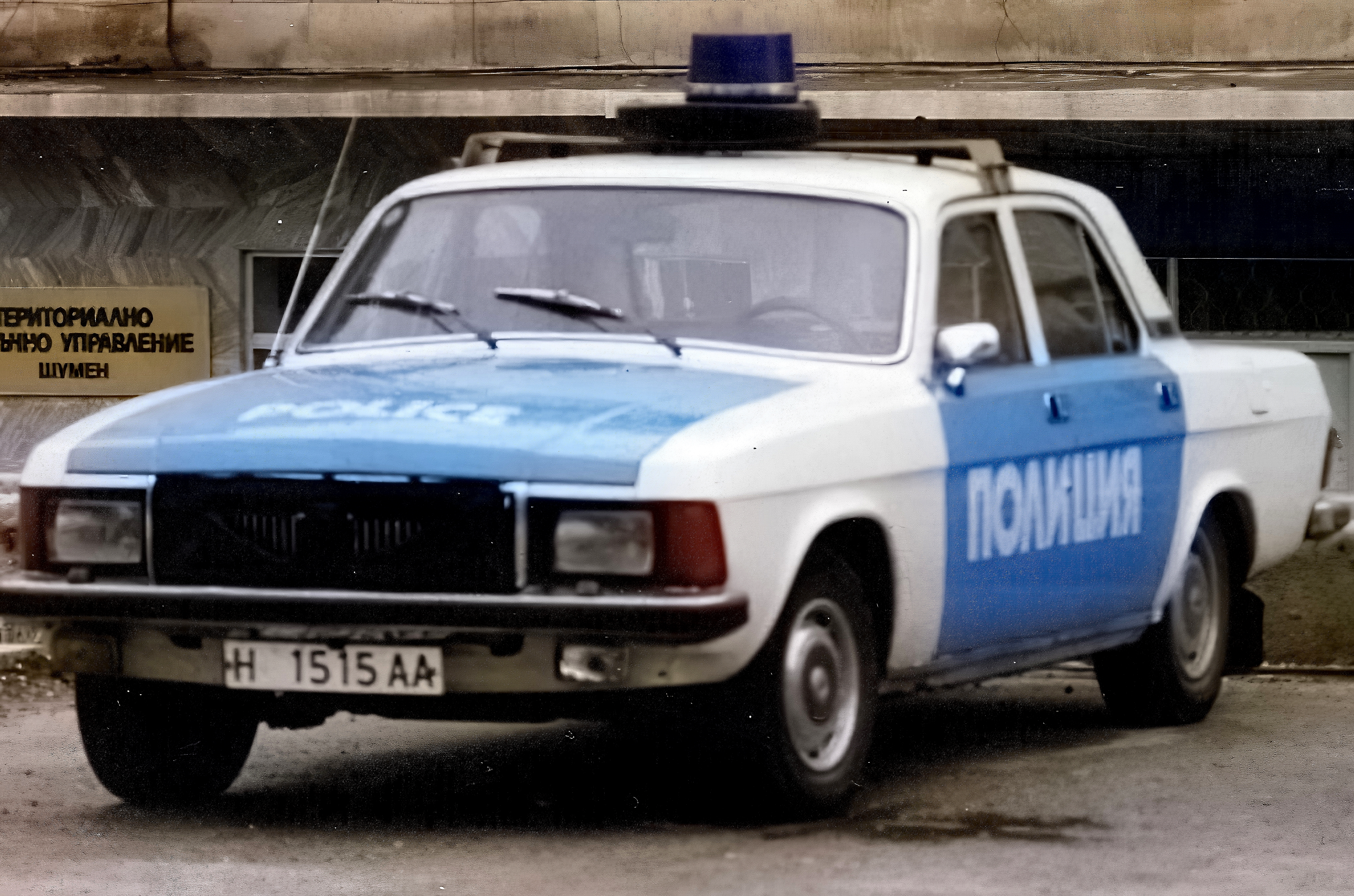
The noticeable position of the fuel hatch is of the few indicators that this is an early production car, with the original stratified charge injection

For the next two years, GAZ was left with a car approved for production, but without the necessary go-ahead from Moscow. Several reasons played a role, but most of all was the same administration of USSR's planned economy that forced the third generation Volga into a GAZ-24-derived replacement. Polyakov, who was keen to see the VAZ giant producing newer cars secured a hefty investment sum for Porsche to assist in development the new front-wheel drive Lada Samara family. Other reasons included the inability for client producers, namely the Zavolzhye engine plant to begin production of the V6 unit. Autoexport was also cautious of such engine, as fuel economy became a major issue following the 1973 oil crisis in Europe, export to which was a source for much needed foreign currency.

== GAZ-3102 ==
=== Technical details ===
Faced with these constraints, GAZ continued to modify and alter (read simplify) the make-up of the car. One such result was the ZMZ-4022 motor with a stratified charge or in original terms—"prechambered—torch ignition". Similar to Honda CVCC design, GAZ experimented with such technology in the early 1950s, and its patent dates to 1968. Now that it had time to spare, it was decided to introduce this novelty. To keep production costs low, the new engine retained all of ZMZ-24Ds key features: 4 cylinders, OHV, displacement etc. However the material of both cylinder block and head was now aluminium. The big novelty was four additional inlet valves that charged the combustion prechambers. Feeding this was a three barrel carburettor, where the draft from third barrel was directed into the four prechambers. The spark plugs were located inside these chambers, and lean fuel-air mixture in main cylinders was ignited by conical jets (the "torches") from these prechambers. Compared to the ZMZ-24D, power rose by 10 hp to 105 at 4750 rpm. Though the car was 50 kg heavier in weight, it could now do 0–100 km/h acceleration in 16.2 seconds (compared to the 22 on the GAZ-24) and the top speed also rose from 145 to 152 km/h. Whilst not exactly impressive dynamics by the turn of the decade, its fuel economy figures were: from 10.5 litres per 100 km on the GAZ-24 to 8.5.

=== History ===
With the new engine, and in simplified trim, the new car was re-christened as GAZ-3102. Still hoping to introduce the V6 powerplant at a later date, the GAZ-3101 designation was retained for it (and will be used for the V8 "Chaser" models). Power steering and automatic gearbox were also removed from the make-up. The "new" Volga was re-submitted to Moscow for the go-ahead to production in early 1980 and was showcased at the Moscow Olympics to the wider public. Despite the general interest in the car, it would take a completely different route for the production order to finally come.

Back in late 1976 GAZ launched its third-generation limousine, the GAZ-14 Chaika. Unlike the 3101, GAZ was able to secure the necessary go-ahead and funding for this limited vehicle. It also kept its original upsize design philosophy and compared to its predecessor, the GAZ-13 Chaika, the GAZ-14 turned out to be a much bigger and more prestigious car. Though the country's economy was stagnating at an alarming rate, its ageing ruling class (the nomenklatura) was increasing, as were its appetites, and in the semi-official hierarchy, not everyone was entitled to upgrade from the old Chaika to the new one. As a result, GAZ-13's assembly, a car developed largely from the 1956 Packard Patrician and built since 1959, was continued alongside the new Chaika, despite its obvious archaism for the time.

==== Start of production ====
It would take a tragedy to break this paradox situation. On 4 October 1980, outside the city of Minsk, a truck rammed the motorcade killing the First secretary of the Byelorussian Communist Party, Pyotr Masherov. It remains controversial if this was an "accident" given his political ambitions, but he died in a GAZ-13 Chaika (though his status not only allowed him the GAZ-14, but even the flagship ZIL-4104 limousine). In the aftermath, GAZ had to endure criticism that it was producing an archaic vehicle, and in 1981, the last GAZ-13 departed Gorky. Such turn of events left the Soviet third-ranking nomenklatura without a status car, for whom the standard GAZ-24 Volga was no longer acceptable. It was here that the GAZ-3102 finally found its role, never to be sold to the public or be available to it as taxi or ambulance. An estate version, though developed, never saw assembly.

In April 1982 hand-assembly of this car began at the specialised unit on the factory that built the Chaikas, with an annual production of about 3000 cars. Despite its status and assembly quality, by the mid-1980s it was clearly an out-of-date automobile compared to its western counterparts. It was planned that both the GAZ-3102 and GAZ-24 be retired by the end of the decade. With ascendancy of Mikhail Gorbachev, the start of perestroika and the appointment of Nikolay Pugin, former administrator of GAZ as Minister of Automobile Production, headway was made into development of their replacements by the new 3103/3104/3105 family. As a temporary measure, GAZ was able to use most of the mechanical upgrades of the 3102 and retrofit them to the GAZ-24 (see GAZ-24-10) in 1986.

==== Later history ====
However the collapse of the Soviet Union, and Russia's difficult entry into the market economy froze these ambitions permanently. In 1992, the stampings of the GAZ-24 would completely deteriorate, and using the 3102s press forms, the GAZ-31029 would result on the conveyor (effectively the anticipated end-result, more than a decade late). At the same time, hand assembly of the GAZ-3102 has all but ceased as the target market, the mid-level officials, now had access to foreign cars, with whom the GAZ-3102 could not compete. No longer tied to the state, in 1993 GAZ made the 3102 available to the public. Again this was a temporary measure, as the small-volume unit anticipated a new car (in the form of GAZ-3105 and GAZ-3111, see below), but "temporarily" lacking one would leave a sizeable workforce unemployed. Without a stablemate (the GAZ-14 Chaika was forcibly retired in 1988, again see GAZ-3105 section) GAZ now had the resources to increase volumes to ten thousand per annum (which it reached in 1996).

Adoption for greater volume assembly would require several modifications (or simplifications) to be performed. The novel, but ultimately troublesome in maintenance stratified charge ignition was removed, replaced by a standard ZMZ-402 engine. Another change was the location of the fuel tank and spare wheel. The original GAZ-24 had its tank under the boot, and the wheel fixed inside it, occupying a generous cargo volume. For the GAZ-3102, the fuel tank was moved behind the rear seat, and the spare took its place. Not only did this increase safety, but also ease of access at the petrol station (the hatch was located just below and slightly behind the C-pillar). For economical reasons, the GAZ-31029 retained the original configuration and in unifying the stamping forms, the 3102 was fitted with the older layout.

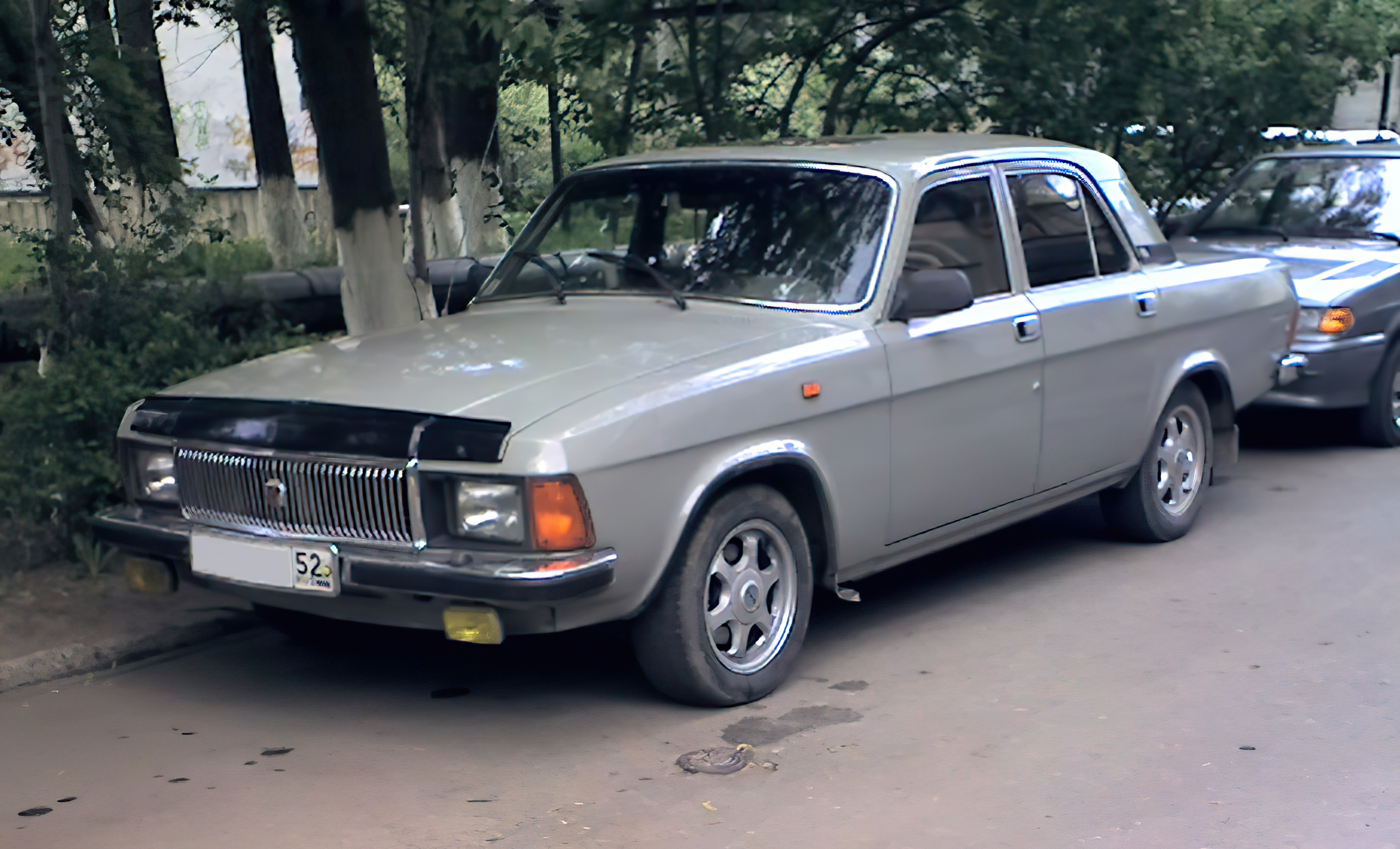
It is not hard to estimate the production year for any GAZ-3102 just by visual examination. The lower location of the fuel hatch—after 1993. Metallic paint—after 2001. Original door handles—before 2005.

Despite a higher price, the GAZ-3102 enjoyed relatively good sales, and remained in demand. Compared to the GAZ-31029, it had a notably higher reputation for build quality. When the former was to be retired, and replaced with the GAZ-3110, the 3102 was fitted with 3110 upgrades, but not upgraded externally, as its look had become classic. The upgrades included a 5-speed gearbox, fuel-injected ZMZ-406 engine, ventilated Lucas disc brakes, a single rear axle, power steering, new electric dashboard and trim. In fact, all these features would be first tested on the GAZ-3102, before being introduced to the mass-produced Volga.

This final arrangement would enter into a pattern, that would hold until 2009. Any novelty would first be introduced in the 3102, would be then fitted to the 3110 (and 31105 after 2005). Changes would include body-coloured door handles, electronically regulated door mirrors with indicator lights and twin-torsion beam rear suspension, removal of the archaic kingpins from front suspension, and new engines such as the ZMZ-405 or licence built Chrysler DOHC and Steyr Diesels. In early 2009, after nearly 26 and a half years in assembly, the GAZ-3102 would be finally retired. A total of 155,850 cars were hand built over the period, including 27 thousand original Volgas with the ZMZ-4022 engines.

== Variants ==
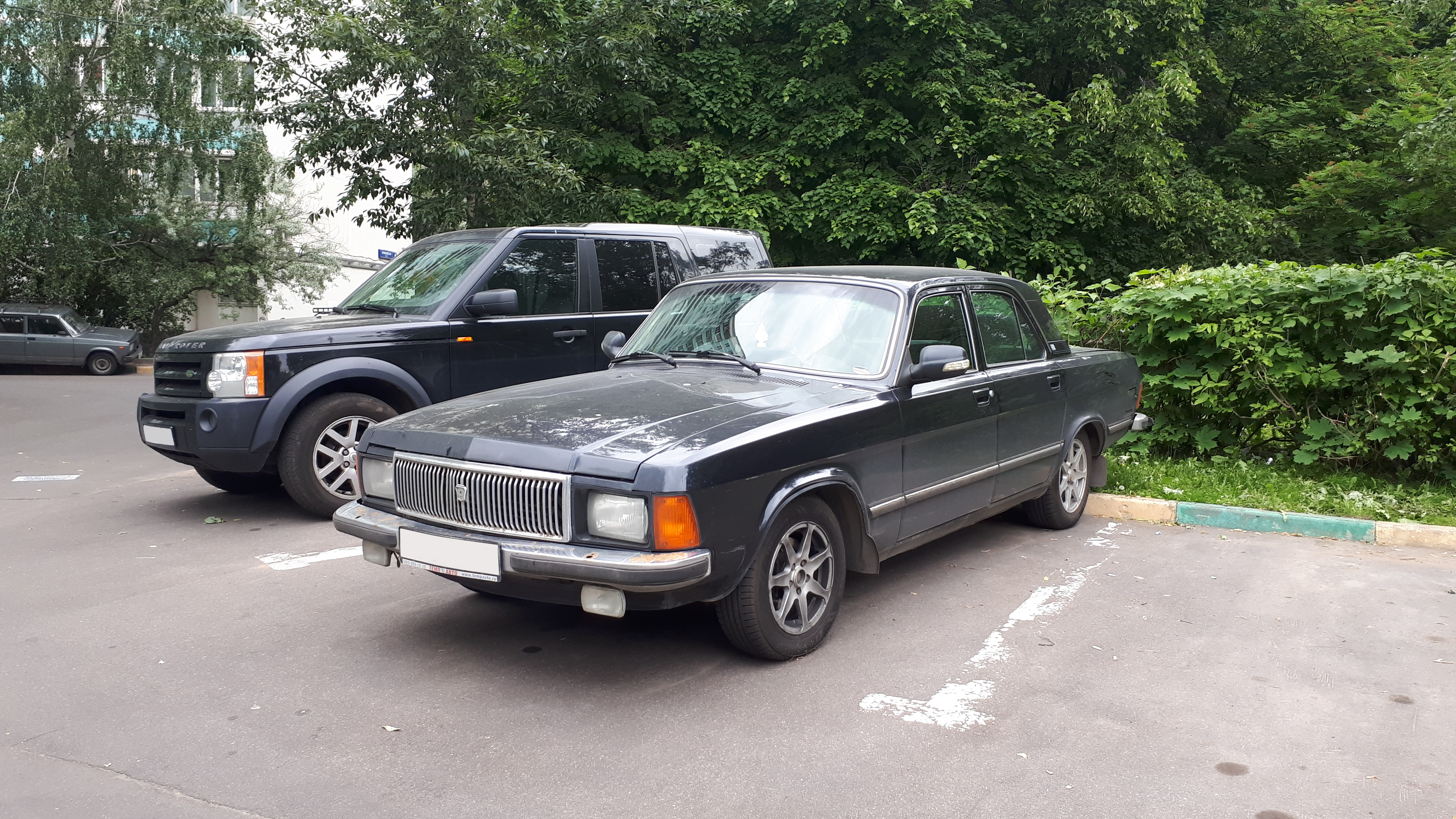

Like the GAZ-23 and the GAZ-24-24, specialised V8 "Chasers" also existed, and these retained the original GAZ-3101 designation. The GAZ-31011 carried the ZMZ 503.10, a modernized version of the GAZ 24-34's closed crankcase ventilation engine that is itself based on the Chaika's original engine, the ZMZ-13 with 195 hp. The GAZ-31013, on the other hand, had the more powerful twin carburettor 220 hp ZMZ 505.10 based on the V8 from the newer GAZ-14. No more than 300 such cars were produced for the 9th Directorate and its successor, the Federal Protective Service until 1996.

There were also a number of prototypes built: the 1983 31025 with 70 hp (52 kW; 71 PS) 2,112 cc (129 cu in) Indenor diesel; and the 3102L with longer wheelbase, from 1987.
