= Sedelnikov (ship) =

History
- Name: Sedelnikov Russian: Седельников

General characteristics
- Type: Cargo ship

Sedelnikov (Russian: Седельников) is a Cargo Ship, operating on the Lena River from the port of Osetrovo in the town of Ust-Kut. The vessel is named after the scientist and regional specialist Alexander Sedelnikov.

== 2002 accident ==
The Sedelnikov was travelling with a barge loaded with cars down the river from Osetrovo. As the Sedelnikov does not have cabins, the passengers slept in their cars. At 2:00 AM on 19 July 2002 she collided with the empty bulk-oil tanker RT-774, as the latter sailed up the river in the opposite direction to the Sedelnikov.

Three vehicles being carried by the Sedelnikov, two Kamaz trucks and a GAZ-3110 car, fell into the river, killing six people.

One of the Kamaz trucks blocked the river which was only 3 metres (9.8 ft)-3.5 metres (11 ft) deep at the point of the collision. The Ministry of Emergency Situations sent divers and a crane vessel operating from the passenger ship Zarya to the scene. By 22 July the bodies had been recovered and the cars lifted from the river, allowing the waterway to be reopened.

Early reports from the investigators indicated that there were breaches of safety precautions in the way the cars were being transported, as they should not have fallen from the ship in the event of a collision.
