= GAZelle =

Russian motor vehicle

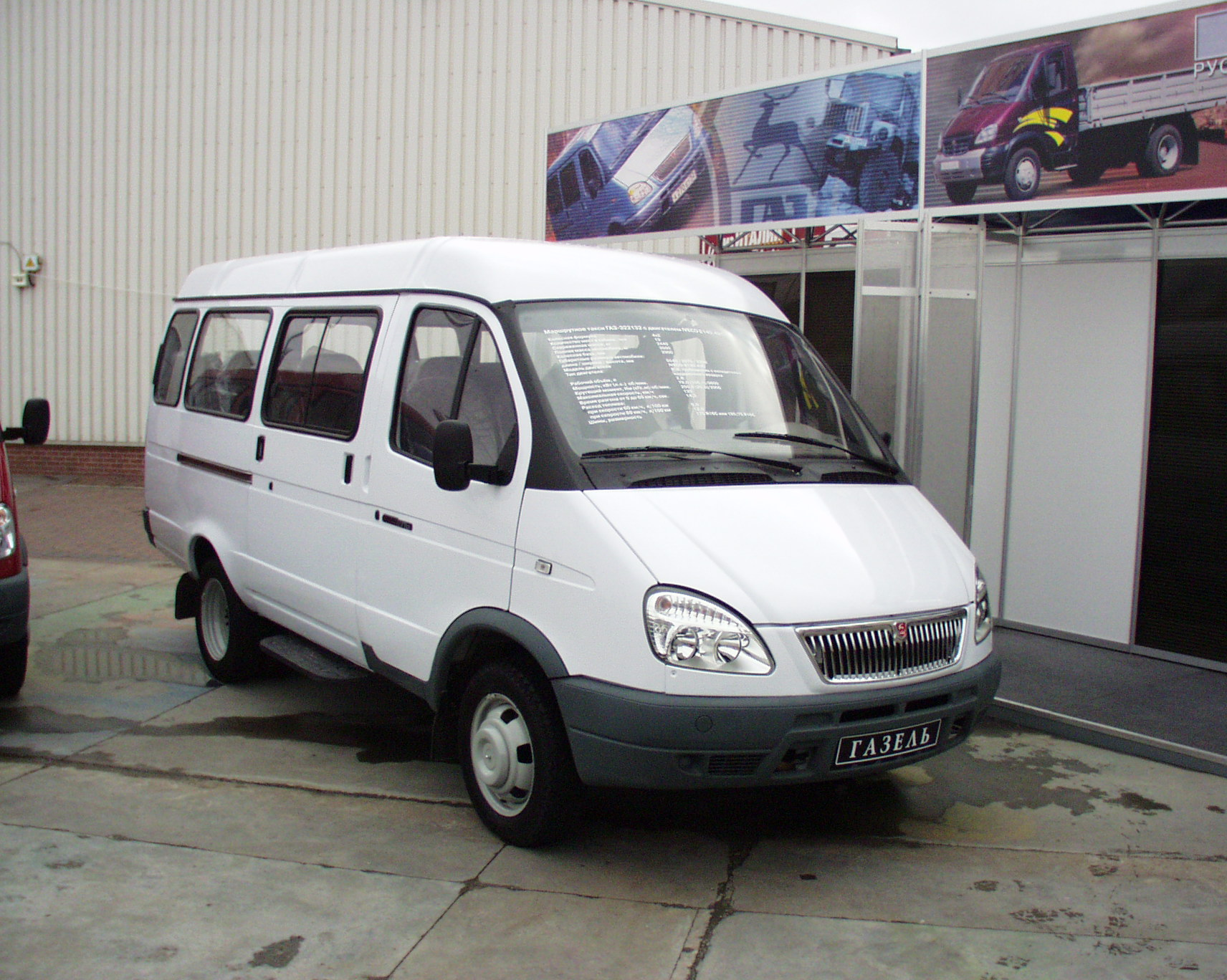
- GAZelle with the restyled front end introduced in 2003

Overview
- Manufacturer: GAZ (Gorky Automobile Plant)
- Production: 1994–present
- Assembly: Russia: Nizhny Novgorod; Lithuania: Rokiškis (UAB "Automašinų verslo centras": 2000–2008); Ukraine: Simferopol, Autonomous Republic of Crimea (KrimAvtoGAZ: 1995–2006); Turkey: Söğütlü (Mersa Otomotiv: 2012–present); Azerbaijan: Haciqabul (Azermash: 2021–present)

Body and chassis
- Class: Light commercial vehicle (M)
- Body style: 2-door dropside truck 2/4-door pickup truck 4-door panel van 4-door minibus
- Layout: FR layout
- Related: GAZ-31029

Powertrain
- Engine: petrol: 2286 cc ZMZ-406 I4; 2429 cc Chrysler EDZ I4; 2445 cc ZMZ-402 I4; 2460 cc ZMZ-405 I4; 2890 cc UMZ-4216 I4; LPG: 2890 cc UMZ-42164 I4; diesel: 2134 cc GAZ-5602 I4; 2781 cc Cummins ISF turbo I4
- Transmission: 5-speed manual

Chronology
- Predecessor: RAF-2203
- Successor: Gazelle NEXT

The GAZelle (Russian: ГАЗе́ль) is a series of light commercial vehicles—including pickup trucks, vans and minibuses—made by Russian car manufacturer GAZ. Up to the dissolution of the Soviet Union and its transition to a market economy, the Russian automobile industry had not produced a light commercial vehicle of the Ford Transit or VW T4 class. The GAZelle shares many parts with the company's passenger car range (especially GAZ-31029); in fact, models produced until 1998 had the same grille, and Volga engines were still used in the GAZelle until 2010.

Riga Autobus Factory, which formerly manufactured minibuses for the whole USSR, remained in Latvia, and now required its vehicles be sold to the now-foreign Russian market for hard currency. Responding to this market opportunity, GAZ swiftly developed its own LCV called GAZelle (the name is a pun on "gazelle"), which, taken together with its lighter version, Sobol, now account for the majority of the Russian van and light truck market and have strong positions in the markets of other CIS countries, ranking as GAZ's most popular and successful products.

On the surface, the GAZelle's design is reminiscent of the 1986 Ford Transit, but there are major differences between the two vehicles, including the size of the wheels, door opening, and footboards, as well as the heating system, among other differences. The GAZelle has remained successful on the Russian market despite minimal upgrades.

== Design ==
The development dates back to both Soviet designs of the 1980s, which were originally intended for production in a never commissioned vehicle plant in Kirovabad (Azerbaijan), as well as unofficial developments of the GAZ plant from the same period. The project could only be pursued further by GAZ after the collapse of the Soviet Union. In August 1993 the GAZelle was presented at a motor show in Moscow, production started in July or at the end of 1994 in Nizhny Novgorod. The GAZelle uses only Russian-made engines, different manual transmissions were installed, there was no option for an automatic transmission. Also, the front seats have been changed in design, as well as the heating and ventilation system and the engine radiator, the dashboard was redesigned. The ground clearance of the Russian vehicles is higher, it was adapted to the road conditions in Russia.

In 1999 GAZ started production of all-terrain 4x4 versions of GAZelle that utilized parts of the heavier-class vehicles. Now it features an optional rear differential lock offered at ~US$500 extra.

By 2005 one million GAZelles had been built. Apart from the CIS countries and Central and Eastern Europe, GAZelles are exported to Asian and African markets, including Morocco and the Philippines.

In 2010–2011 the GAZelle family underwent a serious upgrade. The upgraded model was renamed GAZelle Business. The changes affected 20 main vehicle units and systems, including steering, brakes, gearbox, cooling system, transmission and interior.

In 2013 GAZ started serial production of the new generation GAZelle NEXT light commercial vehicle that features box van, van, minibus and other versions of different sizes.

=== Generations ===
Name	Date	Photo
GAZelle	1994 – start of production of the first generation. Initially only panel vans were manufactured. The headlights and grille are from the GAZ-31029, alongside the engines and transmission. 1996 – production of minibuses started. 1998 – production of a scaled-down version called the Sobol started.	|
GAZelle	2003 – production of the second generation started. The changes include new teardrop-shaped headlights instead of rectangular ones, new grille, which were very similar to the ones used in the GAZ-31105, new front bumper, increased space under the hood, rear colorless lenses turning lights, combined with the reversing light lenses. A new dashboard and power steering, steel versions are available with all-wheel drive. 2004 – ABS introduced. 2006 – side repeaters turning lights moved from the front wings to the side mirrors, which were painted body color.	|
GAZelle-Business	2010 – a large-scale modernization, 130 constructional changes including a new grill combined with the bumper. Inside, the new family of vehicles differs from their predecessors by way of a front panel, steering wheel, standard audio head unit from Blaupunkt, new cab heater control unit or the front of the cabin. Engine UMZ – 4216 (fresh family car commercial - UMZ - 4216.10 ) got a new injection control program, whereby the maximum torque (220.5 Nm) is achieved at fairly low (for a gasoline engine) 2500 rpm. The family of "GAZelle Business" engine mountings were introduced Anvis Group, radiator with aluminum core TRM, Bosch electrical components and Brisk spark plugs. The drive brakes used Bosch products (in particular, the brake master cylinder and the brake servo), the drive clutch components and ZF Sachs, power steering from ZF Lenksysteme was introduced along with defroster door mirrors as standard. New modification of the car with 2010 was equipped with a turbocharged diesel engine (Cummins ISF American development). 2011 – In the factory catalog, the first appearance of a shuttle van with a high roof. 2013 – production of modifications with bi-fuel petrol-gas engine started.	|
GAZelle Next	2013 – production of a completely new LCV started, while the production of the 2010 version continued.	|

=== Models ===
- GAZ-3302 dropside truck and chassis, rear-wheel drive, regular three-seat cab
- GAZ-33021 dropside truck and chassis, improved, RWD
- GAZ-33023 dropside truck and chassis, all-wheel drive
- GAZ-33027 dropside truck and chassis, six-seat "King Cab" extended cab, RWD
- GAZ-330237 dropside truck and chassis, extended cab, AWD
- GAZ-3221 minibus, 8 seats, RWD
- GAZ-32213 minibus, 13 seats, RWD
- GAZ-322132 minibus, 13 seats (marshrutka, for shuttle services), RWD
- GAZ-2705 panel van, RWD
- GAZ-27051 ambulance, RWD
- GAZ-27052 Combi panel van, extended cab, RWD
- GAZ-27057 Combi panel van, extended cab, AWD

== Variants ==
The GAZ Sobol is a lighter duty version of the GAZelle, built on a shorter wheelbase. It was introduced in 1998.

The GAZ Valdai is a heavier duty version of the GAZelle, built on a longer wheelbase. It was introduced in 2003 and was discontinued in 2015.

The GAZelle cabin is also used for building tracked all-terrain carriers such as GAZ-3409 «Bobr» (Beaver).

Before GAZ introduced its own GAZelle-based minibus, various smaller Russian factories launched rebuilding of panel van GAZelles into minibuses ("Pskova-2214", "STG-01") and different custom vehicles. A few Russian and Ukrainian factories still produce custom buses and ambulances based on GAZelles of "Business" and "NEXT" generations.

== Trim levels ==
Before the 2010 upgrade, customers were not given the opportunity to select options. Currently the Gazelle-Business can be ordered with a rear differential lock, ABS braking system, "de luxe" instrument panel, and the "Package" option that includes fog lights, electroproof mirrors, front electric windows, dashboard "de luxe" (radio control buttons on the steering wheel and audio package) and central locking of the front doors.

The succeeding GAZelle NEXT generation of LCVs has its own schedule of basic trim levels and options.

== Gallery ==
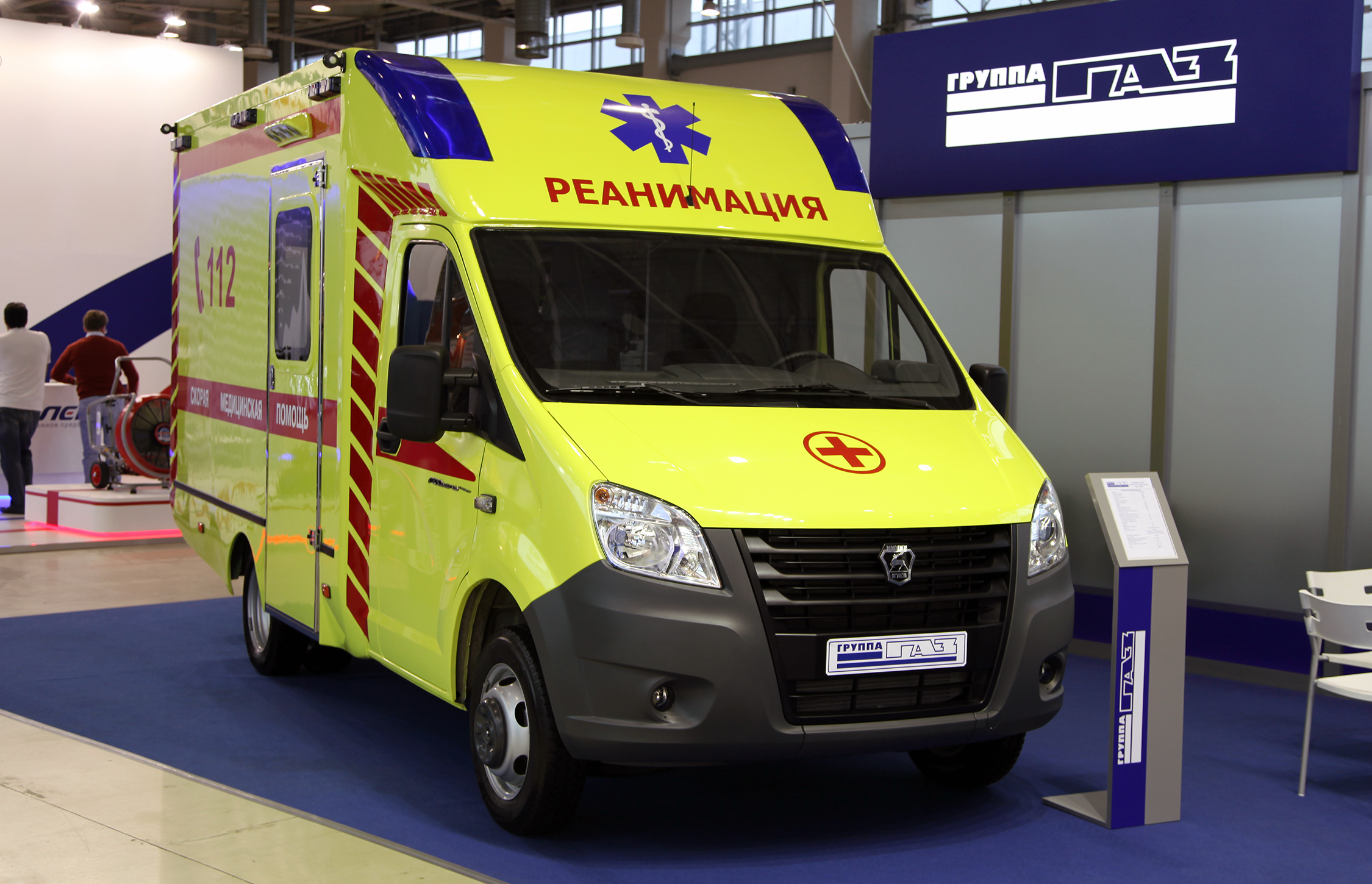
GAZelle Next ambulance

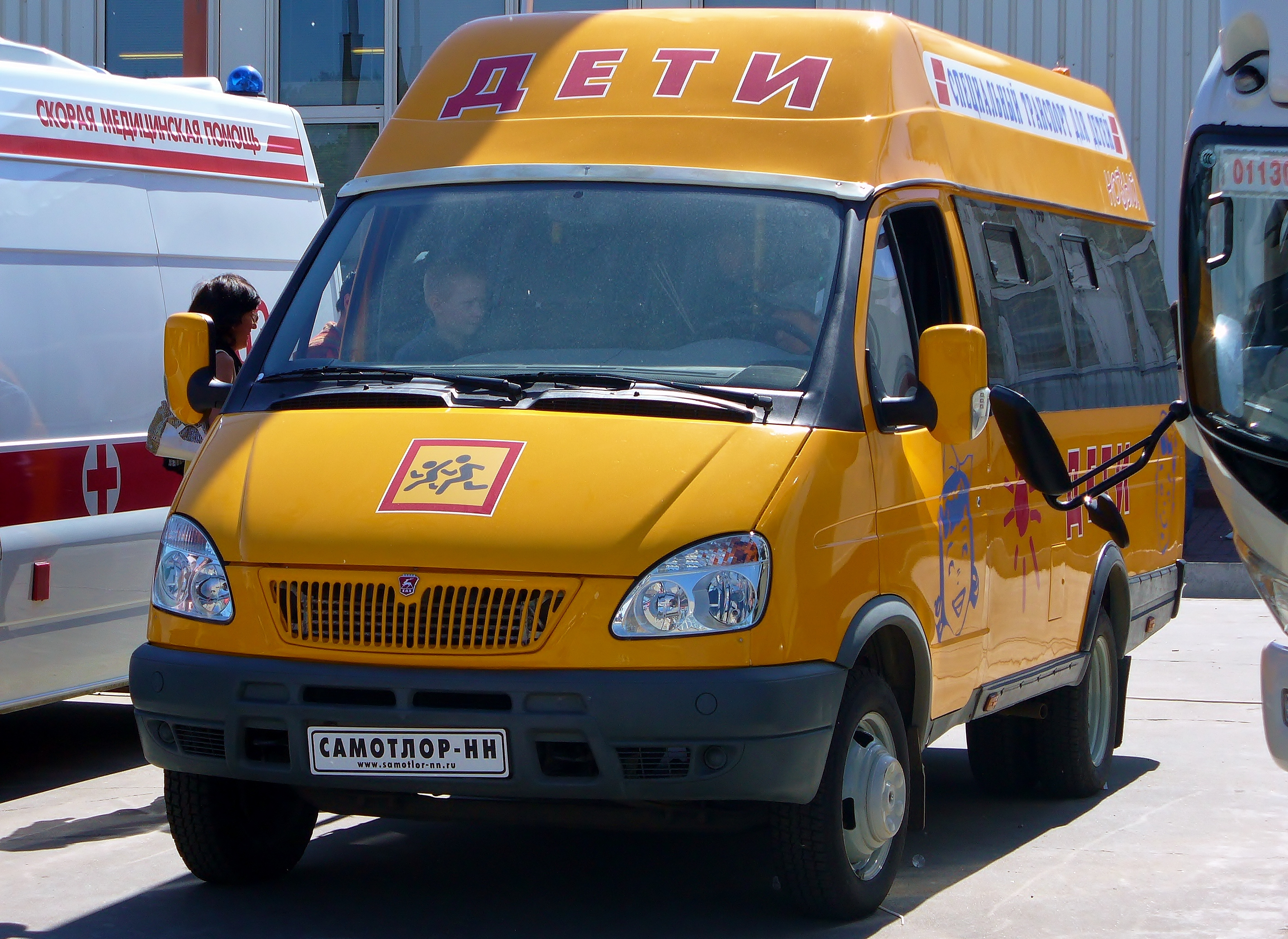
GAZelle 2705 school bus

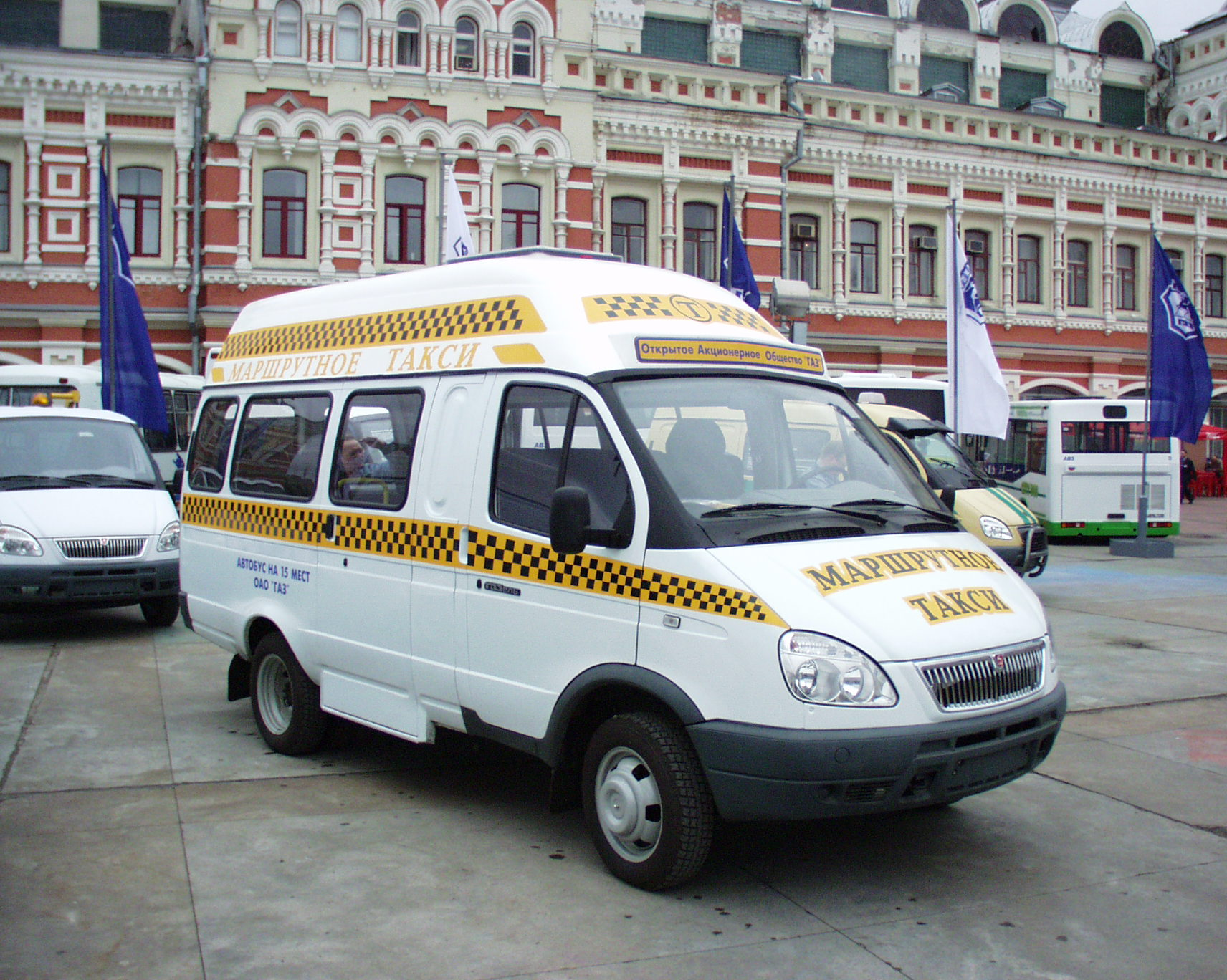
A white GAZ-322133 GAZelle marshrutka (taxi minibus)

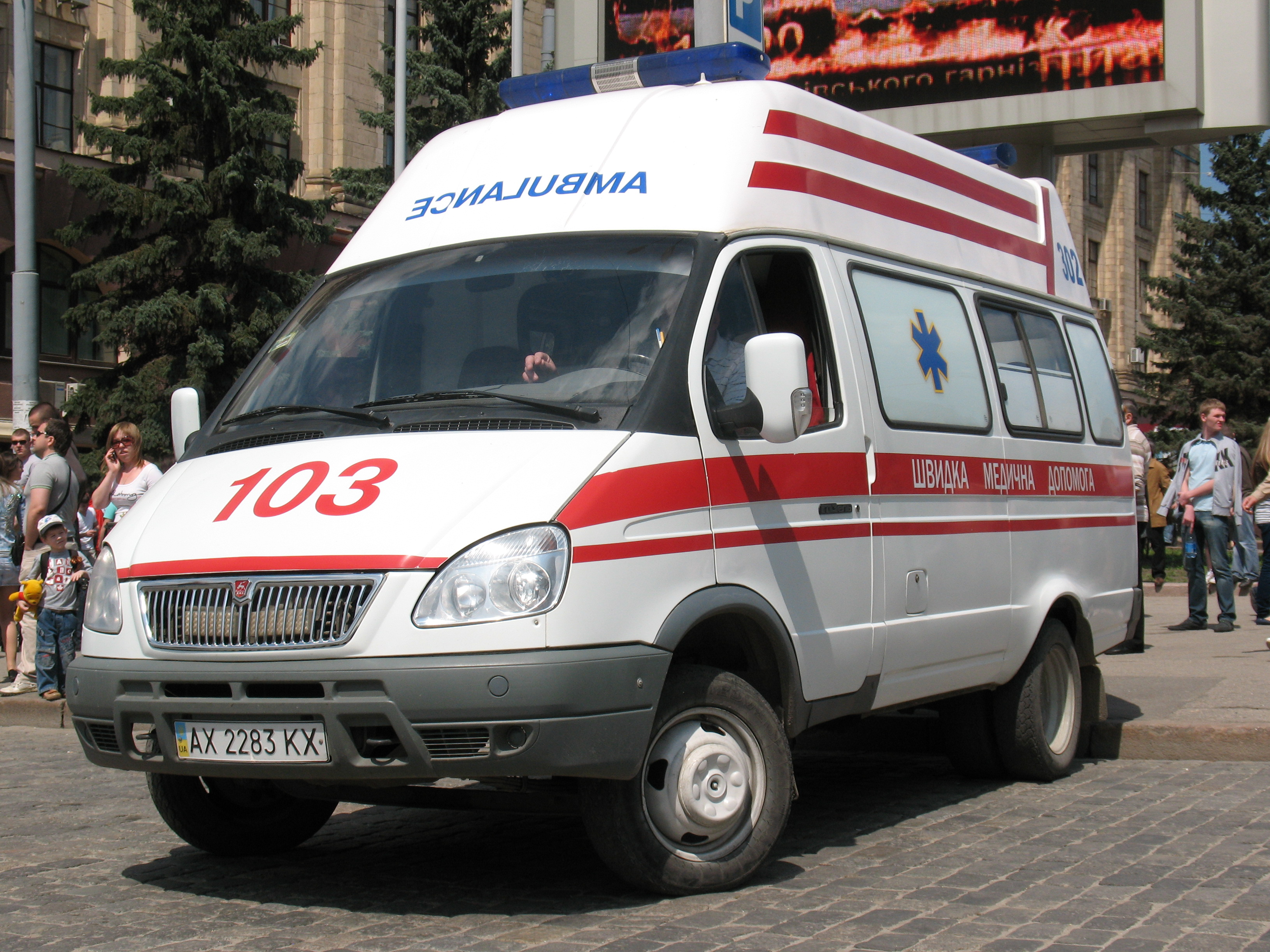
GAZelle ambulance in Kharkiv

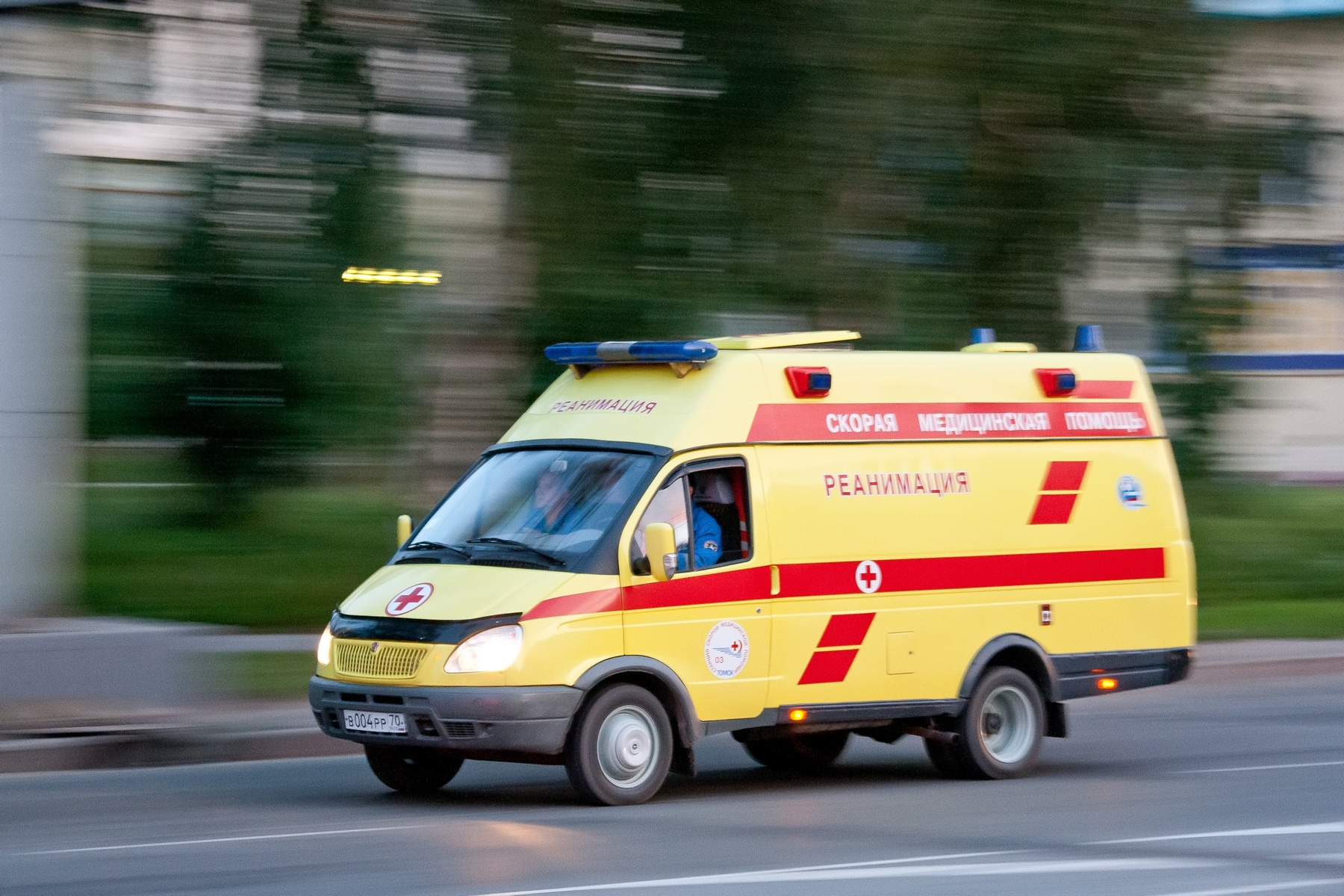
GAZelle ambulance in Tomsk

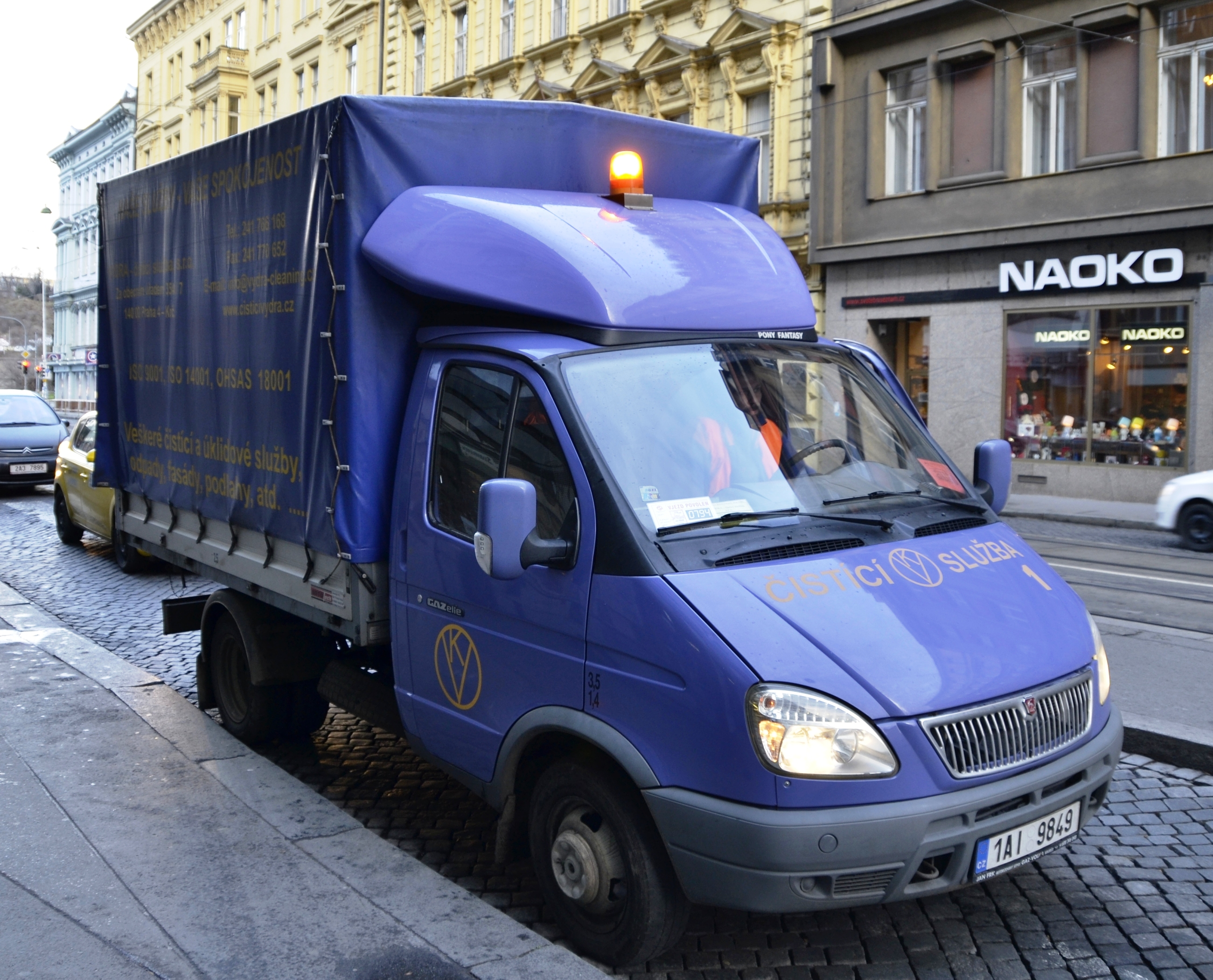
GAZelle in Prague

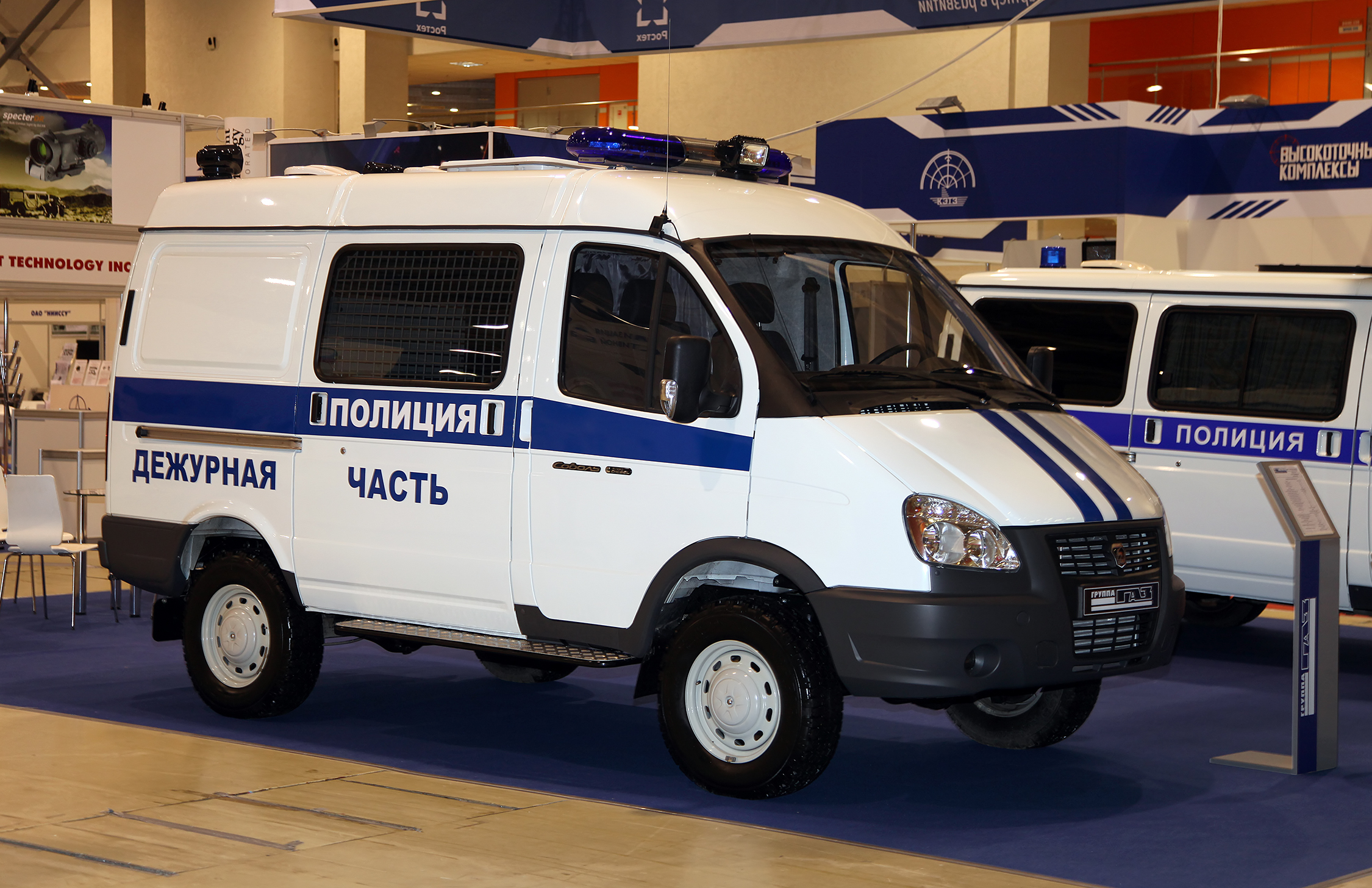
The shorter GAZ Sobol as a police van

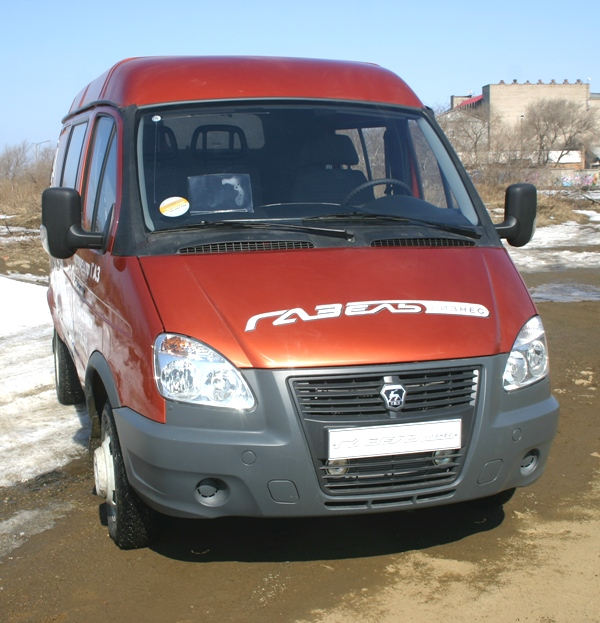
GAZelle-Business (2010–present)

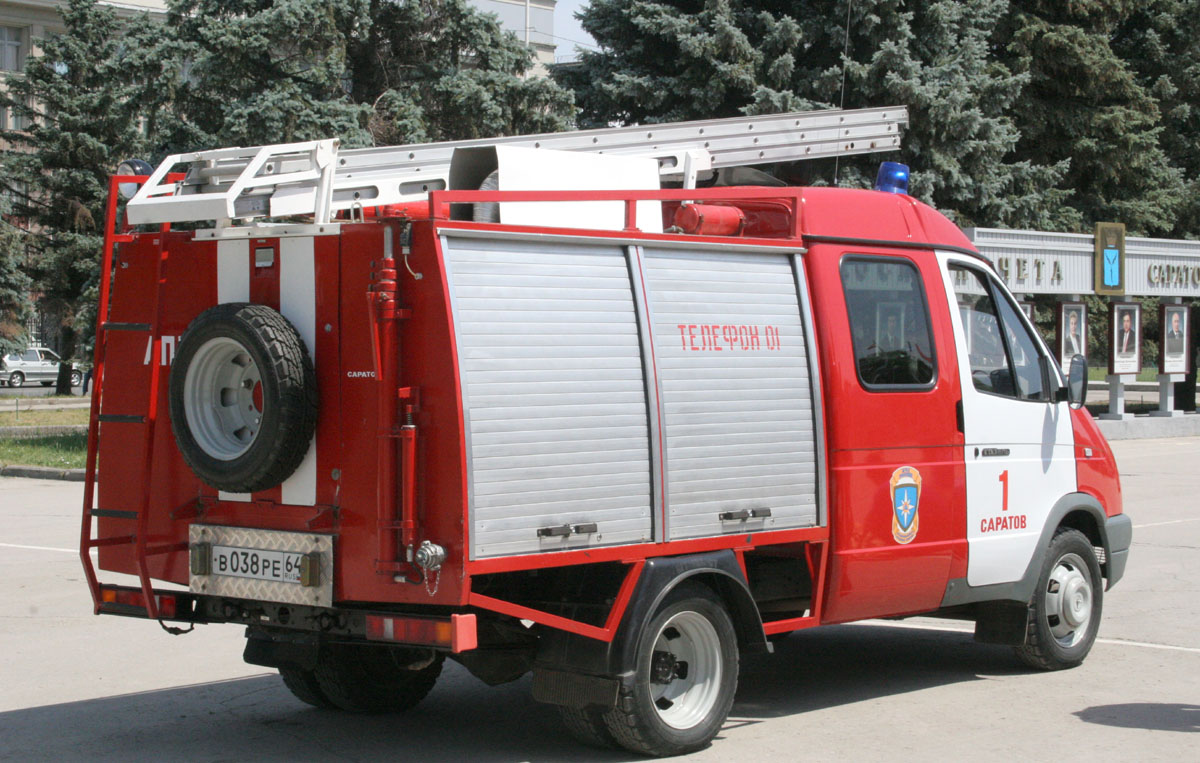
A firefighting GAZelle van in Saratov

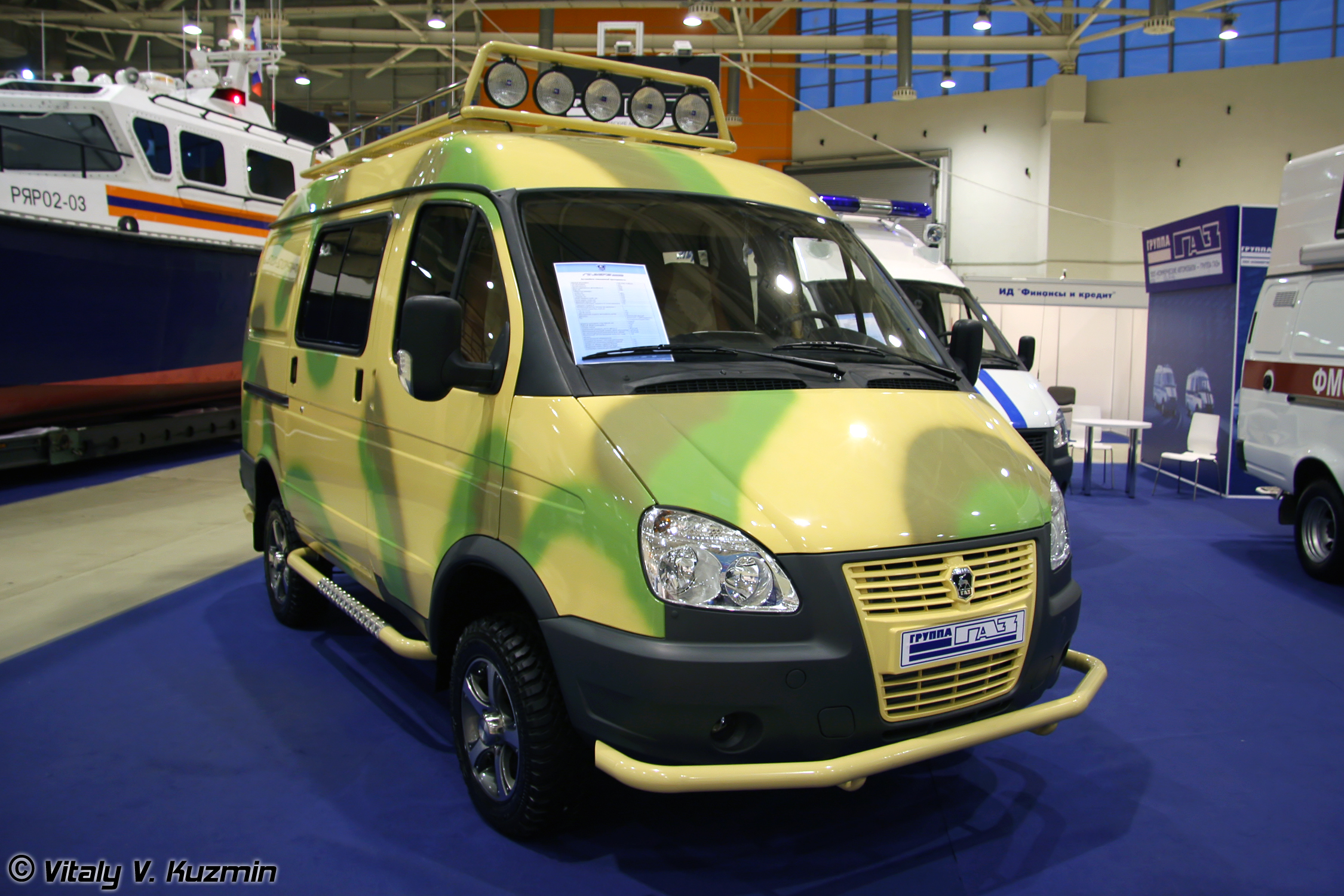
GAZ-27527 Sobol all-terrain camper

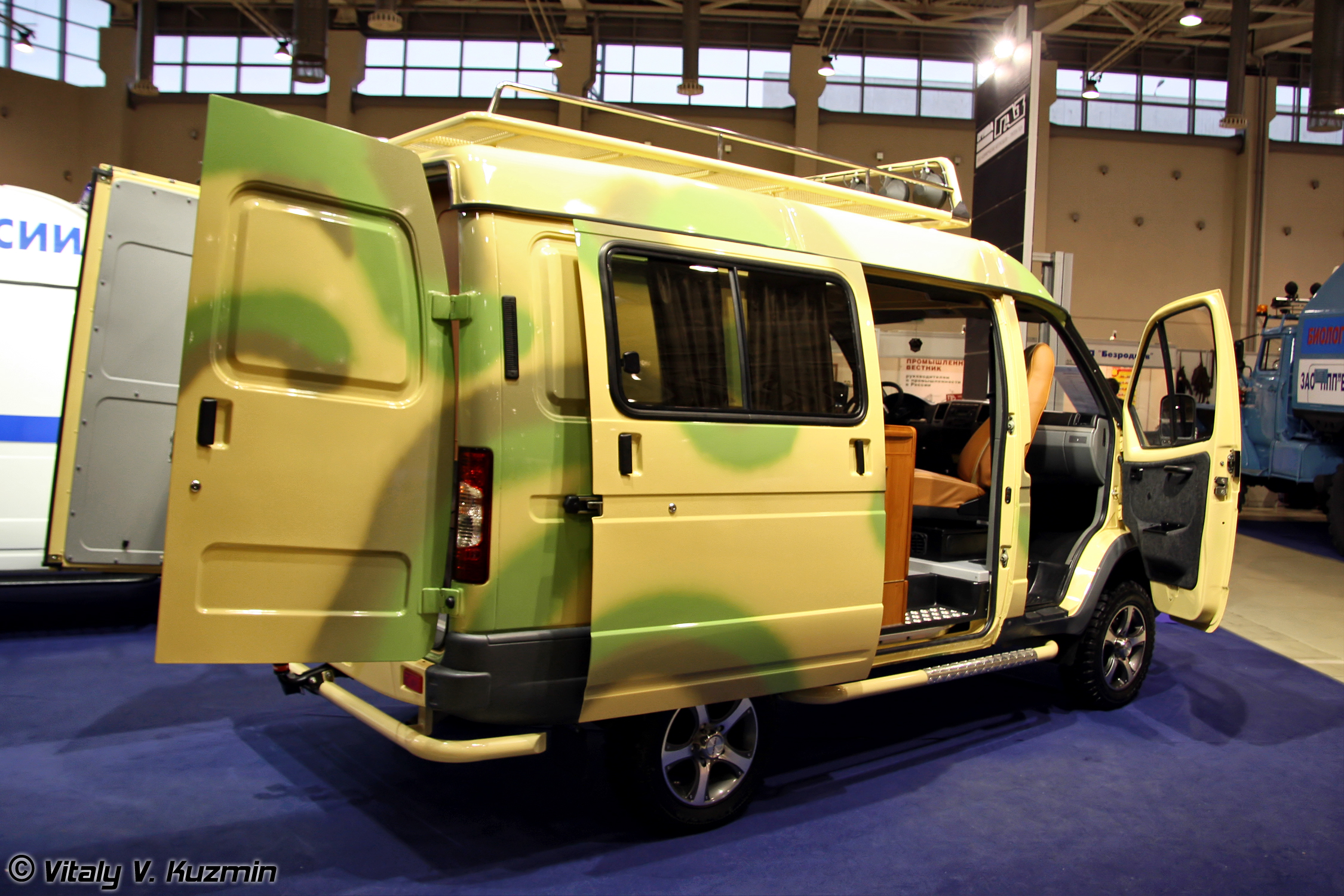
Sobol'-based camper van

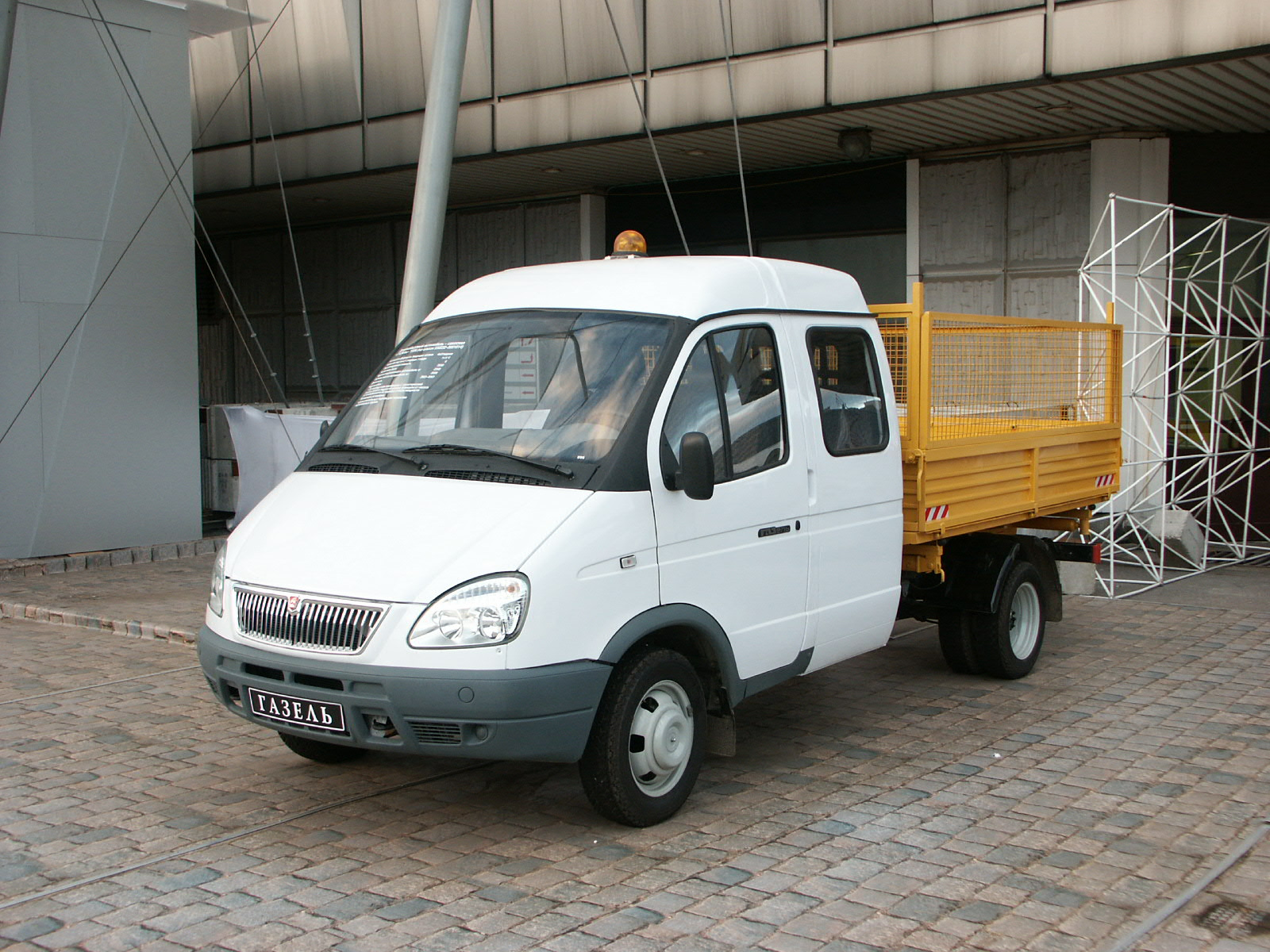
Pickup utility truck

== See also ==
- FIAT Ducato
- VW Crafter
- Mercedes-Benz Sprinter
- LDV Maxus
