= GAZ-3110 =

GAZ-3110 Volga
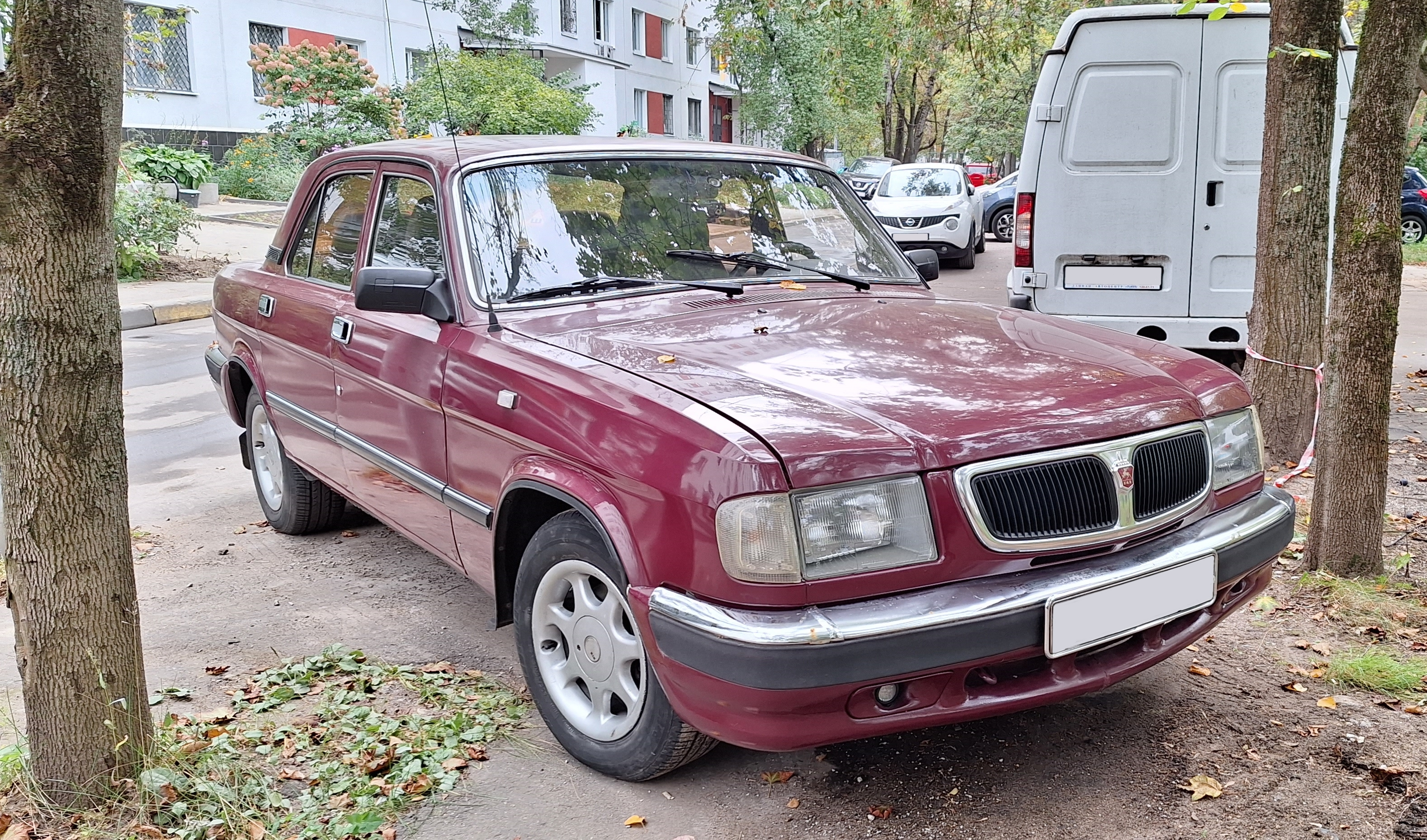

Overview
- Manufacturer: GAZ
- Production: 1996–2004 (Sedan); 1997–2010 (Estate)
- Assembly: Russia: Nizhny Novgorod; Ukraine: Simferopol (KrymAvtoGAZ: 1997–2004)

Body and chassis
- Class: Mid-size
- Related: GAZ-31105; GAZ-31029

Powertrain
- Engine: 2.3 L ZMZ-4062.10 I4; 2.5 L ZMZ-402.10 I4; 2.5 L ZMZ-4021.10 I4; 2.1 L ZMZ-560 I4 diesel; 2.7 L ZMZ-561 I5 diesel
- Transmission: 5-speed Manual; 4-speed Aisin Warner Automatic

Dimensions
- Wheelbase: 2,880 mm (113.39 in)
- Length: 4,870 mm (191.73 in)
- Width: 1,800 mm (70.87 in)
- Height: 1,422 mm (55.98 in)
- Curb weight: 1,400-1,550 kg (3,086-3,417 Ib)

Chronology
- Predecessor: GAZ-31029 Volga; GAZ-3102 Volga
- Successor: GAZ-31105 Volga

The GAZ-3110 Volga is an automobile manufactured by the Gorkovsky Avtomobilny Zavod (GAZ, Gorky Automobile Plant) from 1996 to 2004 as a generation of its Volga marque.

== History ==
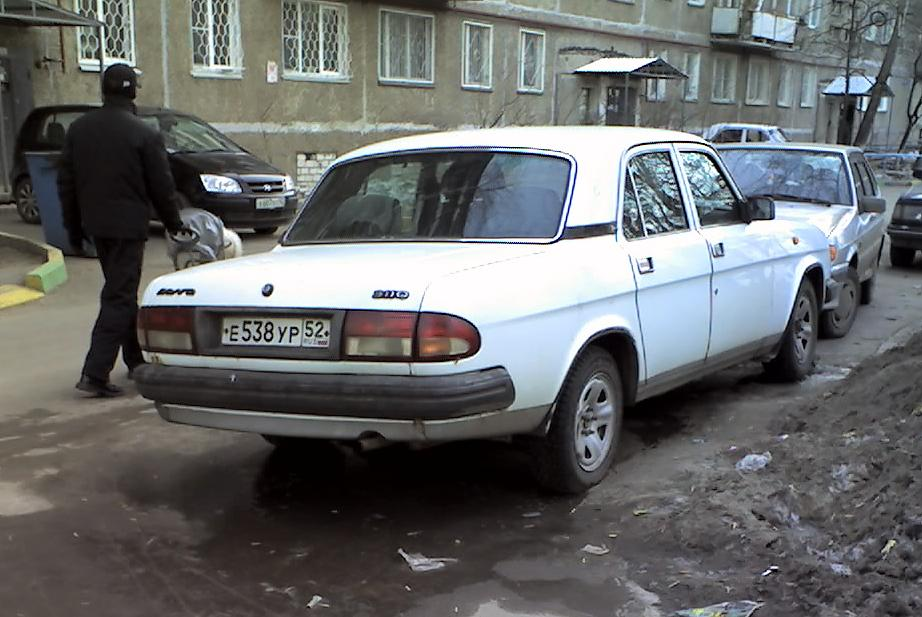
GAZ-3110 Volga early series

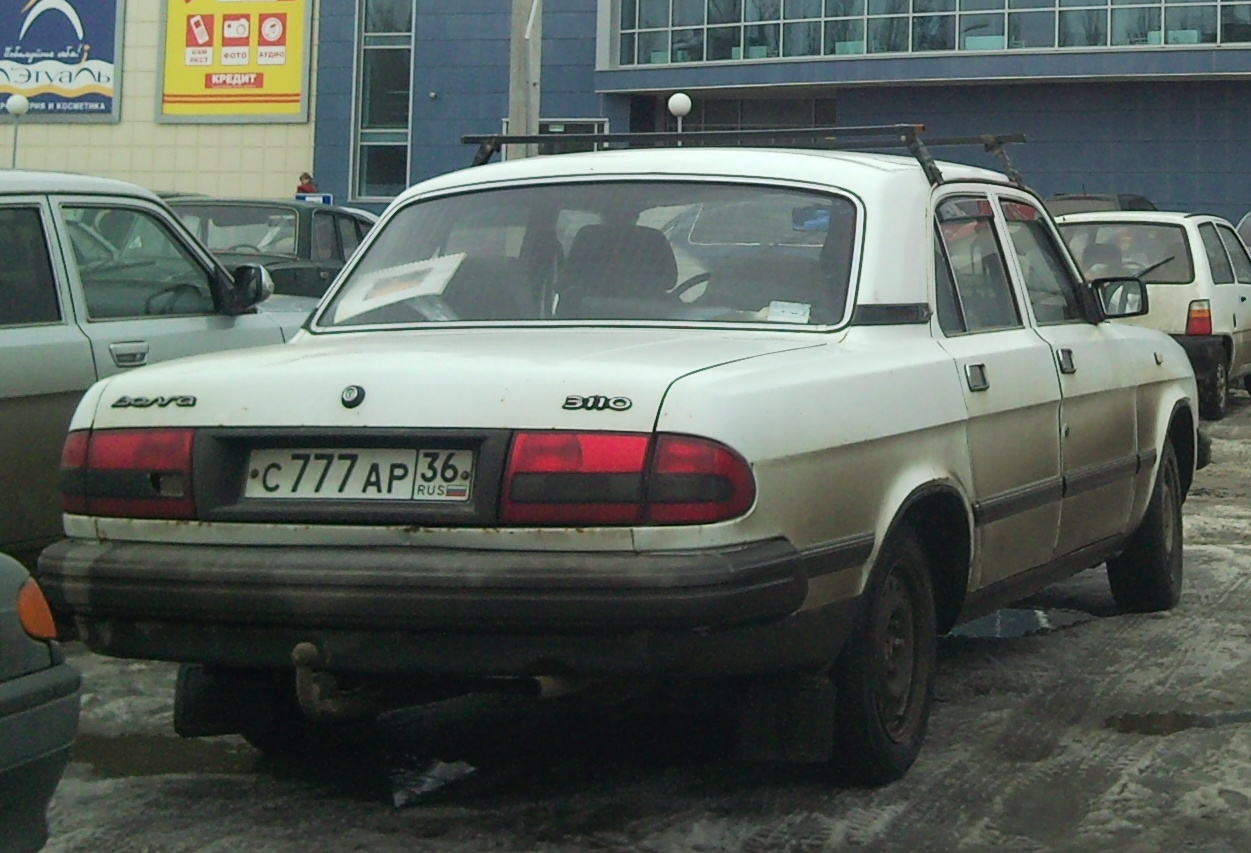
GAZ-3110 Volga later series

After the launch of the GAZelle, the plant secured a stable influx of needed revenue for its own upgrade and future models. Having failed to introduce the GAZ-3103/3104/3105 family, and seeing that demand for the GAZ-31029 Volga was still high, it was clear that the car could and would soldier on for a considerable time. Instead of experimenting with "temporary" cars, such was the inherit nature of both the GAZ-24-10 and GAZ-31029, a more permanent solution was chosen by giving the vehicle a major upgrade. Work began in 1995, and a prototype was shown at the Moscow car show that year.

Overall, the GAZ-3110 was a success despite its aged profile. GAZ finally had a car that could bridge a gap before the planned new vehicle (GAZ-3111) entered in the early 2000s. Though hardly a rival for new foreign marques, it certainly did snatch their re-sale market in its favour. Prices in 1997 was US$ 8800 for the budget version with ZMZ-402 engine, and US$ 12,900 for the ZMZ-406 equipped. Even the 1998 Russian financial crisis hardly affected the Volga's demand, quite the contrary, GAZ capitalised on marketing it as an inexpensive alternative.

However, the car was still plagued by the common reliability issues of all 1990s built cars: poor assembly quality, faulty electronics, and low service culture, especially for the fuel-injected 406 models. The latter engine in 1999 already had its first refit and a compression ratio reduced to 9.2 to avoid detonation, reducing the power from 150 to 131 hp.

As the decade closed, in 2000 GAZ was in active preparation to launch the GAZ-3111 Volga. The vehicle demanded a serious upgrade to existing facilities at the plant, and as these came online, they were extensively tested by the GAZ-3110. For example, the new Haden Drysys paintshop, when introduced to the conveyor, with attractive acrylic and metallic finishes, helped to tackle the major corrosion problems of the GAZ-3110. Simultaneously came the new 265/70R15 tyres. A small series of licence-built Steyr Diesel engines (ZMZ-560) were available.

The coming of the GAZ-3111, would not have replaced the GAZ-3110 altogether, and to finish its conveyor lifetime in 2001 a small visual facelift introduced body coloured bumpers with a black resin trim, that featured drooping spoilers and integrated fog lamps.

== Technical details ==
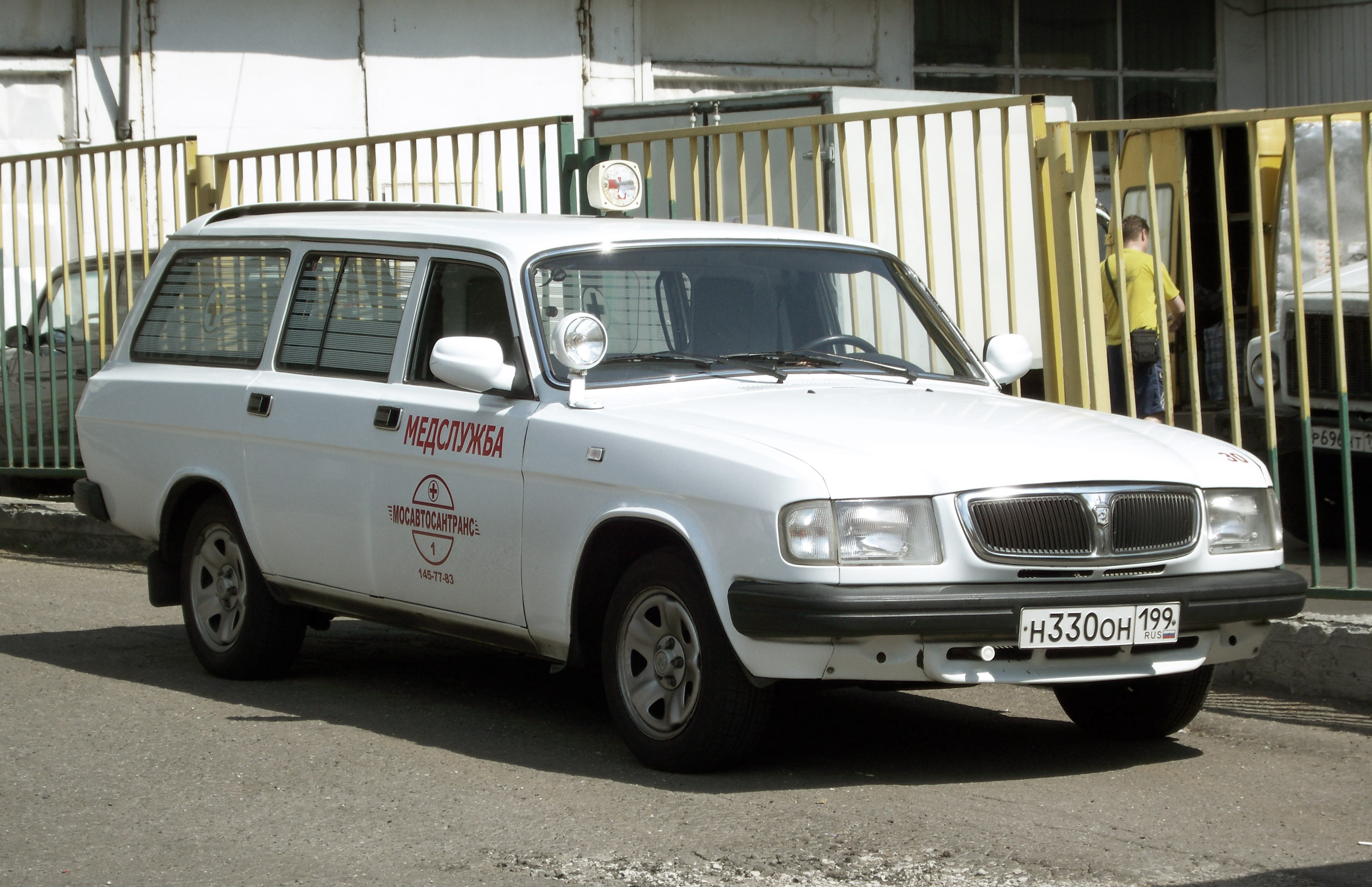
GAZ-310223

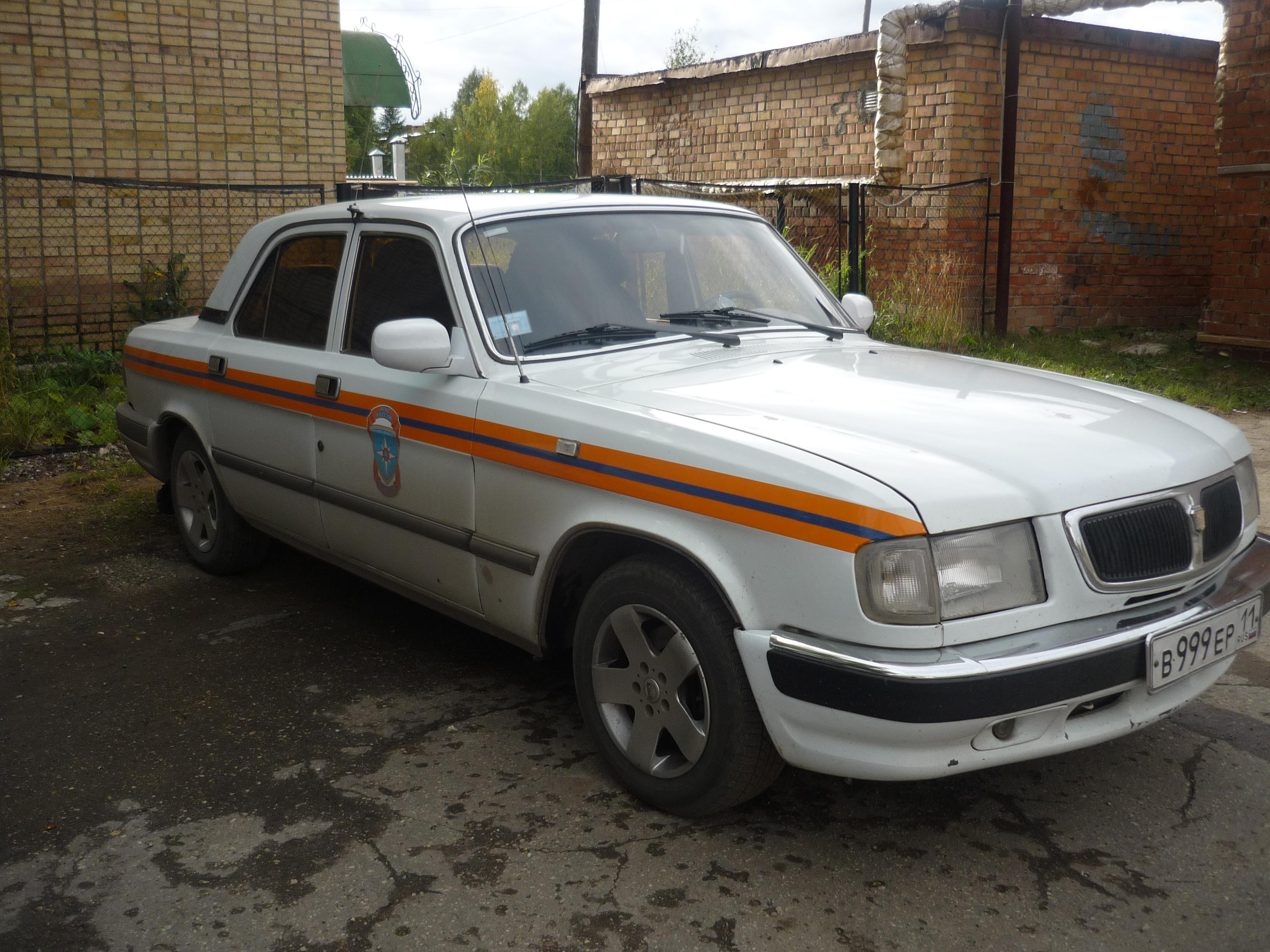
EMERCOM post-2001 MY Volga

The engine unit for the new car was already present and a test batch of ZMZ-406 equipped GAZ-31029s was available since 1996. Sharing the ZMZ-402's piston group, the motor was to all intents and purposes completely new, despite undergoing a lengthy research and design period. The motor's brief was drawn in 1982, and finalised only in 1986, to be used on the new GAZ-3103 and GAZ-3104 models. A contemporary twin overhead camshaft (DOHC)—four valve per cylinder scheme was chosen with Bosch fuel-injected intake. The high inertia of the piston stroke limited potential forced induction, and was thus reduced from 92 to 86, hence a volume decline of 2445 cc to 2286 cc. Compression on the naturally aspirated 406 was now 9.3 instead of 8.5 of the 402, and the redline grew to 5500 RPM (4750 on the ZMZ-402). A two-step timing chain was implemented for reliability, and a cast iron cylinder block to give it necessary strength when used on future modifications with forced induction and/or diesels. The 406 engine was mated to the five-speed manual or 4-speed automatic transmission. Front disk brakes and power steering was now standard.

Externally the car retained only "skeletal" details of its predecessor: central pillars, doors and platform. The remaining panels were designed from scratch, simultaneously tying in the mid-1990s contoured fashion with passive security crumple zones. A side-asset of this new layout was a dramatic ease in vehicle manoeuvring during tight traffic and parking, as the archaic corners were effectively sanded off, particularly the rear boot space, that narrowed off after the rear-wheel arch. The boot lid had a higher profile and its lip extended to bumper level, simultaneously easing access and increasing volume. Inside, the boot featured a modern trim, the spare tyre was conveniently pushed into the centre of the seat on a special frame, whilst driver's toolkit was stored in hidden recesses underneath. The car's fascia retained the GAZelle/GAZ-31029 corporate look, but built on it with a vertically split grille and the front plastic bumper had a chrome top finish. Punctuating the new silhouette were 15 inch alloy rims.

Inside the car's interior was also new, with fully adjustable heated seats, foam-filled dashboard and door linings, whose finish colour can be now selected (as opposed to standard black plastic on GAZ-24-10/GAZ-31029). The decorative elements could be ordered with an image of lacquered timber (as opposed to the stickers on the previous cars). Also new was the soft steering wheel with a driver's airbag (not available initially). The new instrument cluster finally gained a tachometer and battery charge was indicated in volts rather than amperes. Cabin ventilation and heating was also new, and air conditioner was an option. Windows were now athermic, and tinted, the front electrical raisers were standard, the rear, optional.

== Versions ==
For the 1997 model year production overlapped with the GAZ-31029, but afterwards a budget version was necessary, and a simplified 402 engine/4 speed gearbox with a poorer trim and lacking some options (though power steering and disk brakes would remain) was available.

In late 2002, it became clear that the GAZ-3111 would never come about, and a two-stage upgrade programme was initiated that would result in the GAZ-31105. The first stage was mechanical and was featured on all 2003 model year cars (sometimes called transitional series). The most significant feature was much improved handling, that was achieved via new ball-joint front suspension replacing the archaic kingpins. The rear suspension gained new silent blocks and horizontal stabilisation bar. Also new was the reworked double-synchronised 5-speed gearbox. In accordance to Euro II regulations, all vehicles now featured neutralisers.

== Safety ==
In 2002 the car was awarded zero stars out of a possible four by the Russian ARCAP safety assessment program.
