= GAZ-31029 =

Full sized car manufactured by GAZ (1992-1997)

GAZ-31029 Volga
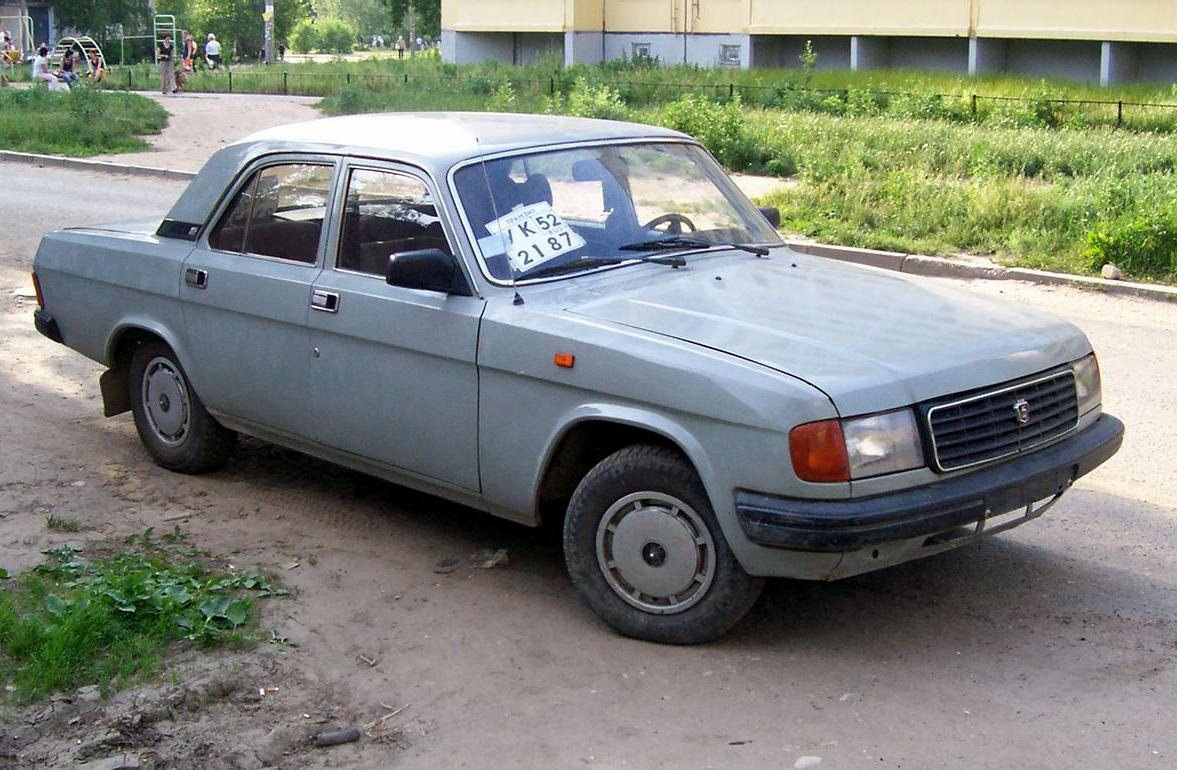

Overview
- Manufacturer: GAZ
- Production: 1992–1997
- Assembly: Russia: Nizhny Novgorod; Ukraine: Simferopol, Autonomous Republic of Crimea (KrimAvtoGAZ: 1995–1997)

Body and chassis
- Class: Mid-size
- Body style: 4-door saloon/sedan 5-door estate/wagon (GAZ-31022)
- Layout: FR layout
- Related: GAZelle; GAZ-3102; GAZ-31105; GAZ-2307

Powertrain
- Engine: 2.3 L ZMZ-4062.10 DOHC I4; 2.4 L ZMZ-402.10/4021.10 I4

Dimensions
- Wheelbase: 2,800 mm (110.2 in)
- Length: 4,885 mm (192.3 in)
- Width: 1,800 mm (70.9 in)
- Height: 1,476 mm (58.1 in)
- Curb weight: 1,390-1,550 kg (3,064-3,417 lb)

Chronology
- Predecessor: GAZ-24-10 Volga
- Successor: GAZ-3110 Volga

The GAZ-31029 Volga is an automobile manufactured by the Gorkovsky Avtomobilny Zavod (GAZ, Gorky Automobile Plant) from 1992 to 1997 as a generation of its Volga marque.

== History ==
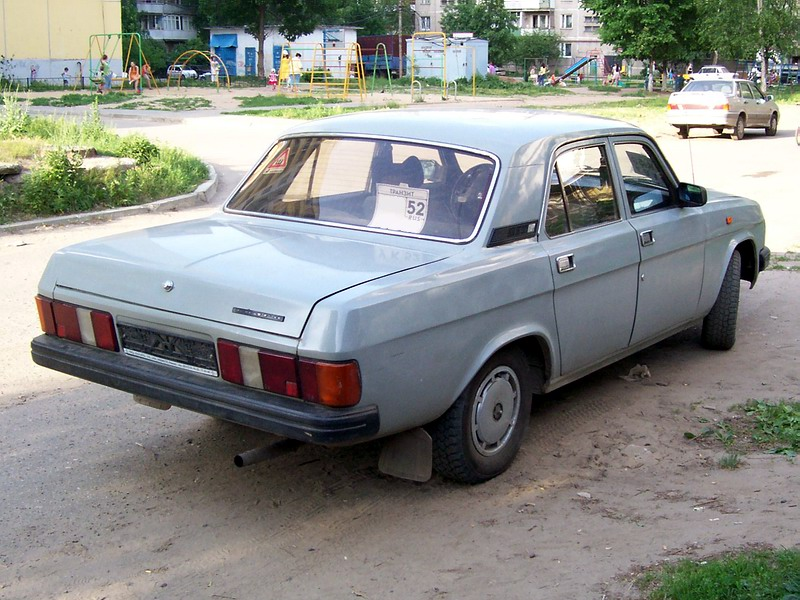
GAZ-31029 rear

Like the GAZ-24-10, the 31029 was also intended as a temporary vehicle. The development of successors to the GAZ-24 derivatives, both the GAZ-24-10 and GAZ-3102, the GAZ-3103/3104/3105 family was experiencing delays, and it was clear that the mass-produced GAZ-3103 and GAZ-3104 series would not come about for a few years to come. At the same time, the GAZ-24-10's stamping presses have completely worn themselves out.

The coming of a market economy demanded a light commercial vehicle and work was hastily underway to retrofit the plant so that it could produce the GAZelle, a car originally intended to be built at the future KiAZ plant in Azerbaijan. To fill the void in demand, offer a fresh and new vehicle (so it could also alter the prices, corrected for the hyperinflation) GAZ carried out yet another modernisation of its Volga car.

== Technical details ==
Whereas the GAZ-24-10 was largely mechanical rather than bodywork, the GAZ-31029 was the exact opposite. Most of the panels were borrowed from the GAZ-3102, whilst the front fascia was made on one hand more modern, with an aerodynamic slant, yet less formal, thus ensuring the GAZ-3102's status would be untouched (effectively the full modernisation plan was implemented, and GAZ finally realised its successor programme for the GAZ-24, almost a decade late). Other differences included black plastic bumpers (the car thus lacked any chrome details, save the optional hub caps).

Mechanically it was identical to the GAZ-24-10, with the exception of electrics, that were slightly modernised, the K-151 carburettor that became standard and the single rear-axle. Introduced in 1992, the car was now wholly available for purchase, and commercial demand quickly capitalised on it as a workhorse. At the same time, the quality of production, due to increased volume (a record was set at 115 thousand per annum in 1993) plummeted. It was the GAZ-31029 that transformed the vehicle's popular image. Whereas in the previous three decades the Volga was a status of power and career success, and even the repressive side of Soviet society, the GAZ-31029 showed a new style of a Volga ownership as an inexpensive vehicle whose owners gained a stereotypical image of being arrogant road users. In popular culture the term "Kozlobyk" was implement (goat-bull) for its robust image.

== Versions ==
With the launch of the GAZelle in 1994 (that used more than 50% of Volga's parts, including the engine and electrics), demand for the Volga slightly fell for commercial role, but not for private use. GAZ finally returned to its modernisation programmes and in early 1996 a version was offered with the new 2287 сс ZMZ-406 fuel-injected DOHC engine and a five-speed gearbox. Producing 145 hp, its acceleration was now 13.5 seconds, and a maximum speed of 170 km/h. Thanks to the overdrive fifth gear, a fuel economy of 9,3 litres per 100 km was possible. This model, GAZ-31029-50 also required to use the front disk brake assembly of the GAZ-3102, and non-integrated power steering.

The GAZ-31029 retained the modifications of the GAZ-24-10, GAZ-31021 was the taxi version, running on 80 RON petrol, GAZ-31022 was the estate version. GAZ-31023 was the ambulance. In 1993 a project was put forward for a pick-up version, the GAZ-2304 "Burlak" which progressed to prototype stage and shown at the Moscow International Motor Show that year, but the GAZelle's entry did not justify production investment.

Unlike the previous Volgas no V8 versions were made for the FSO on the GAZ-31029 basis, the abundance of modern foreign cars have made this vehicle obsolete, and the Special Purpose Garage (GON) would retire most of its Russian-built vehicles by the late 1990s.
