= GAZ-2308 Ataman =

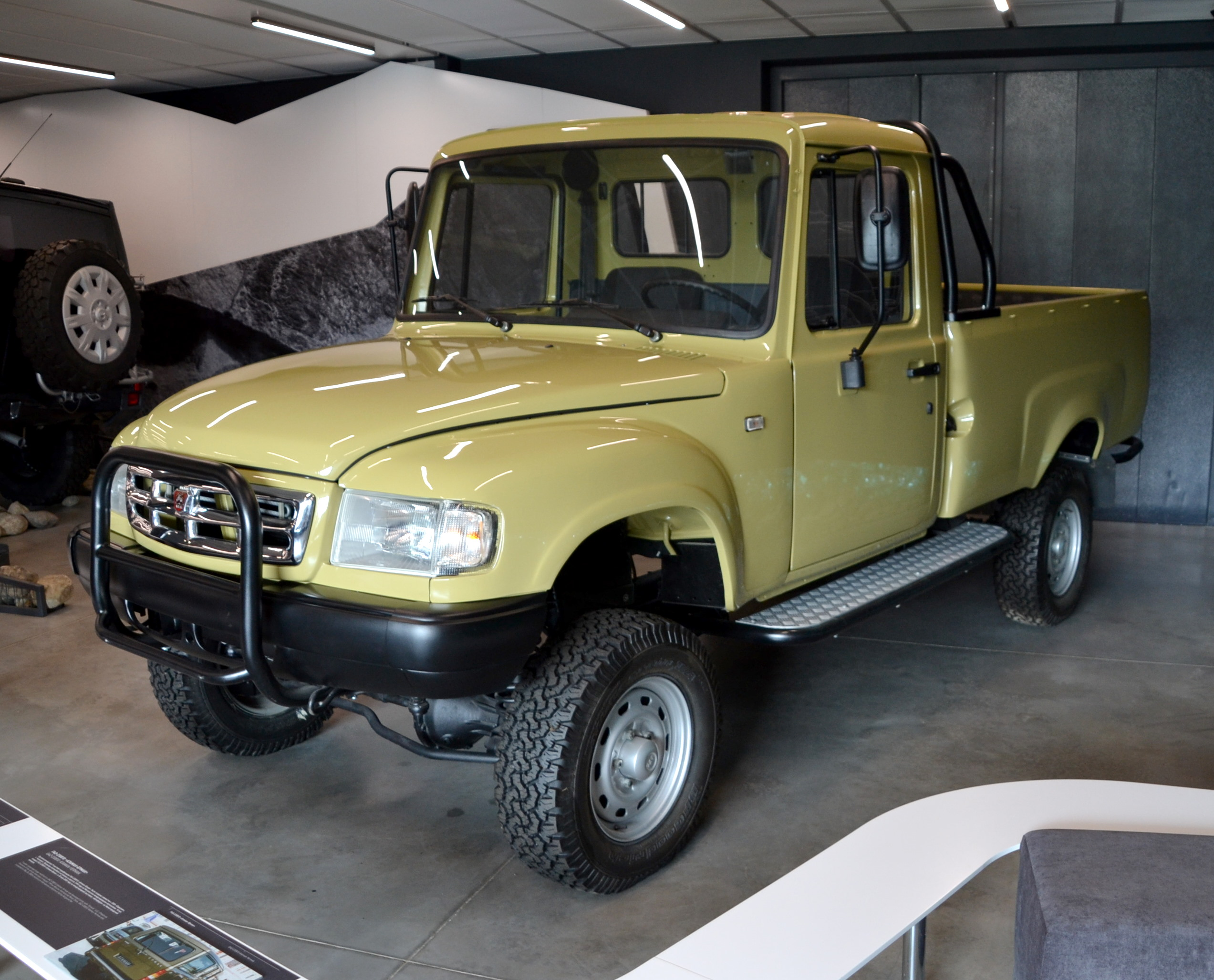

Overview
- Manufacturer: GAZ
- Production: 1995–2001
- Assembly: Russia: Nizhny Novgorod

Body and chassis
- Class: Off-road vehicle
- Body style: Pickup truck
- Related: GAZ-31029; GAZ-3307

Powertrain
- Engine: 2.4 L ZMZ-402.10/4021.10 I4; I4 2890 cc, 105 hp (78 kW)
- Transmission: 4-speed manual 5-speed manual, with lockable center differential and two-speed transfer case

Dimensions
- Wheelbase: 3,100 mm (122.0 in)
- Length: 5,060 mm (199.2 in)
- Width: 1,910 mm (75.2 in)
- Height: 2,070 mm (81.5 in)
- Curb weight: 1,835 kg (4,045 lb)

The GAZ 2308 Ataman is a Russian off-road vehicle produced by GAZ from 1995 to 2001. It was developed as a utility vehicle intended for both civilian and institutional use and was one of several new models introduced by GAZ during the post-Soviet period. It was GAZ's first factory pick-up truck since the 1940s GAZ M415.

Firstly released in 1995 as the GAZ-2307, it was a body-on frame pickup that shared it's front suspension, wheels and tires, rear axle, engine and gearbox with the GAZ-31029 Volga while the cab came from the GAZ-3307 truck. Only a pick-up prototype was built, although a wide range of versions, including vans and tippers, was to be produced. These were to be produced in both rear and front-wheel drive versions, but in reality only this real-wheel drive GAZ-2307 pickup prototype was ever built. In 1996, GAZ decided to turn the concept into an all-wheel drive pickup, with otherwise minimal changes, and rename it GAZ-2308 "Ataman".

The Ataman featured a body-on-frame construction and a four-wheel-drive system. Most examples were produced as two-door pickup trucks, although a number of derivative versions and prototypes were also developed, including station wagon and special-purpose variants. The vehicle used components from other GAZ models and was offered with both gasoline and diesel engines paired with a five-speed manual transmission.

Production of the GAZ 2308 Ataman remained limited throughout its production run. The model was discontinued in 2001 and was not replaced by a direct successor.
