= Haden Drysys =

- Type: Defunct
- Industry: Automotive; Aerospace
- Founded: 1816
- Headquarters: Auburn Hills, Michigan
- Area served: Worldwide
- Website: Hadenmac.com

Haden Drysys International played a major part in the development of the paint finishing industry. It was one of the world’s leading high quality paint finishing systems suppliers. Originally based in Birmingham, England the Company moved to then based in Auburn Hills in the United States in the 1990s. As a tier one supplier, it completed projects in over 60 countries. In 2000, the Company reported sales of $300,000,000. It posted its largest ever sales of $573,516,911 in 1995, including a $220,000,000 complete paintshop at Land Rover in Solihull, England. This huge job had great significance to the automotive sector in Britain and this plant still produces the third most vehicles of all plants in the British motor industry.

== Early days ==
Haden has a long, colourful history. It began trading in 1816 in Birmingham, England. It provided paint finishing equipment across the United States. It was one of the first Western businesses to move into China after the closed door policy ended, completing its first project in 1980 and then several more projects beginning in 1983, covering Jinan, Shiyan and Changchun. It later did work in more prosperous areas such as Shanghai, Nanjing and Tianjin. It played a huge part in the technology transfer from Western Automotive suppliers to Chinese domestic firms. In the 1980s it was also an early mover into Indian and Australasian markets.

== Pioneering research and development ==
Haden developed paint finishing systems, metal finishing systems, industrial process equipment and environmental systems. It covered many industries including automotive, aerospace, general industrial and chemical manufacturing.

Its products were developed through a bespoke research and development programme with high attention to reliability and maintainability. It has numerous patents for new developments such as spray booths, special apparatus and method for applying material to articles, separation systems and sludge removal systems and made numerous technical industry firsts. It pioneered development of the highly energy efficient powder-based paint systems now common worldwide. Other innovations followed with the use of high solids paints and waterborne paints.

== Acquisition ==
Haden International Group including Haden Drysys International was acquired by Palladium Equity Partners on 16 August 2001. Haden International Group had previously been a subsidiary of Haden MacLellan Holdings plc. Based in the United Kingdom, Haden MacLellan Holdings plc had over 185 years of heritage in design, engineering and manufacture. They chose to sell off this part of their business to concentrate on their core fastener business.

== Demise ==
Haden Drysys International was liquidated in 2005 and Haden International Group was liquidated the following year in 2006 marking the end of a pioneering legacy in the Surface finishing industry.
