= GAZ-3111 =

GAZ-3111 Volga
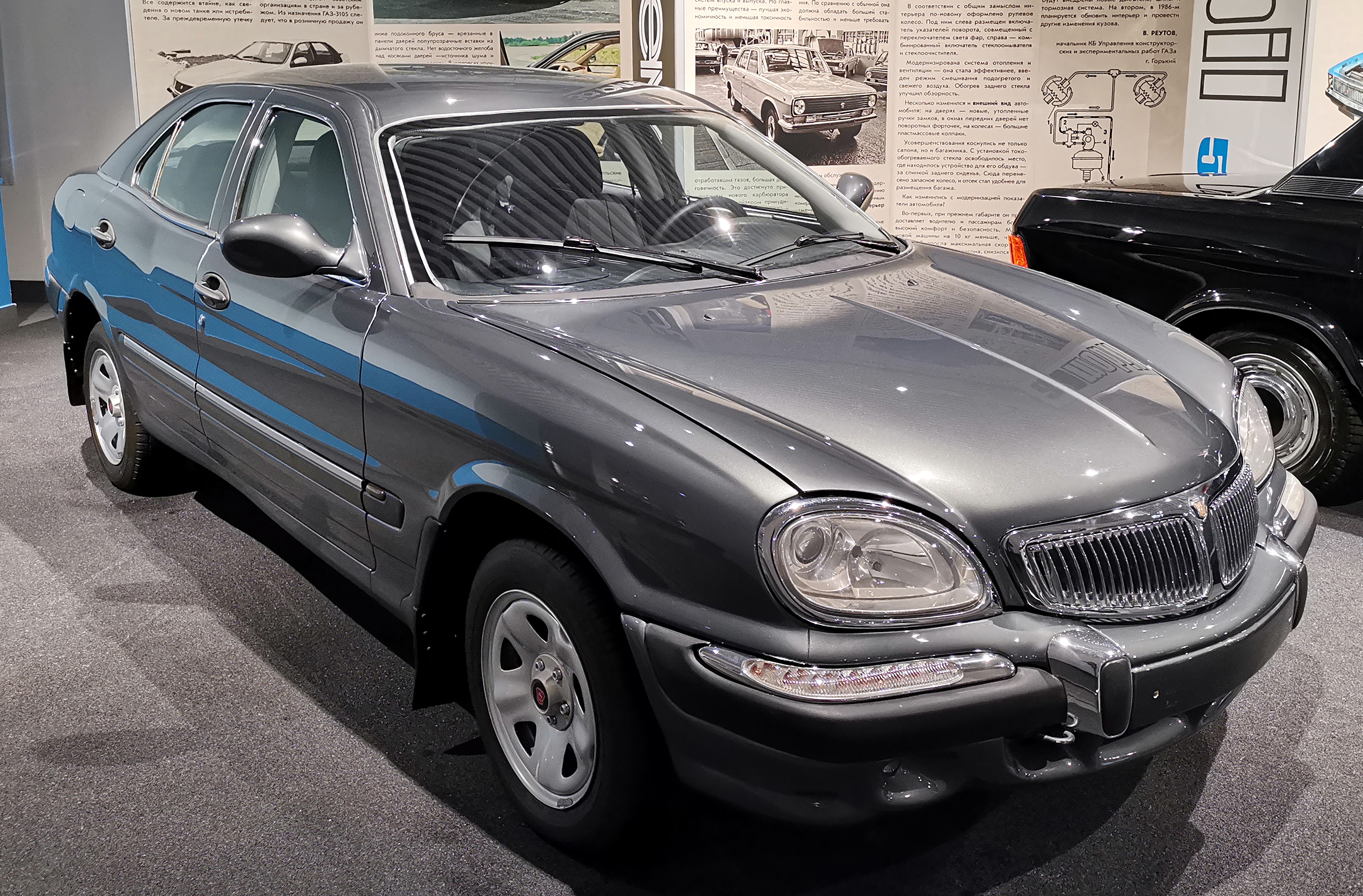

Overview
- Manufacturer: GAZ
- Production: 1998–2002, 2004
- Assembly: Russia: Nizhny Novgorod

Body and chassis
- Body style: 4-door saloon/sedan

Powertrain
- Engine: 2.3 L ZMZ-4062.10 I4; 2.5 L ZMZ-4052.10 I4; 3.4 L Toyota 5VZ-FE V6; 2.1 L GAZ-560 I4 diesel

Dimensions
- Wheelbase: 2,791 mm (109.9 in)
- Length: 4,950 mm (194.9 in)
- Width: 1,800 mm (70.9 in)
- Height: 1,480 mm (58.3 in)
- Curb weight: 1,560 kg (3,439 lb)

Chronology
- Predecessor: GAZ-3105
- Successor: Volga Siber

The GAZ-3111 Volga is an automobile manufactured by the Gorkovsky Avtomobilny Zavod (GAZ, Gorky Automobile Plant) from 1998 to 2004 as a generation of its Volga marque.

The GAZ-3111 was scheduled to launch in 2000, but the factory's new owner Oleg Deripaska, was unimpressed with the vehicle visually and the high price of the car hindered sales. As a result, production ended after just over 400 cars had been built in the pre-production batch. Nonetheless, the car did influence the next facelift of the main Volga - the GAZ-31105, which among with a redesigned fascia finally rid the Volga of the archaic kingpins from the front suspension in 2004.

== History ==
During the early 1990s GAZ managed to survive the crises by having the Volga do a generation jump from the GAZ-24-10 to the GAZ-3110 in 1997. Simultaneously it never abandoned its quest to develop its eventual replacement, and continued designing a new car, which would feature ABS, power steering, climate control, automatic gearbox and most of all V6 and even V8 engines as standard, along with leather interiors. The external design was completely new and featured many GAZ-21 influenced retro styling cues developed in collaboration with a US-based company.

However problems began mounting in production costs, as some details had to be borrowed from the older models, at least initially such as the Chaika's axle. The pre-production models lacked the automatic gearbox, and the engine was the same ZMZ-4062.10 that went into GAZ-3110. First shown in 1998, production was scheduled to begin in 2000 with 53 cars delivered. GAZ thought of the GAZ-3111 as a replacement for the GAZ-3102 and envisioned a rate of 25 thousand per annum. But only 342 were delivered in 2001, and 20 in 2002, with further nine of 2004 before all production ceased.

GAZ-3111 was a failure in terms of marketing and demand. Its high base price and poor reputation that the Volga brand carried in the 1990s meant that those who could afford it, would opt for a foreign car such as the Mercedes E-class or the BMW 5 series with whom GAZ-3111 thought to compete.
