= GAZ-31105 =

GAZ-31105 Volga
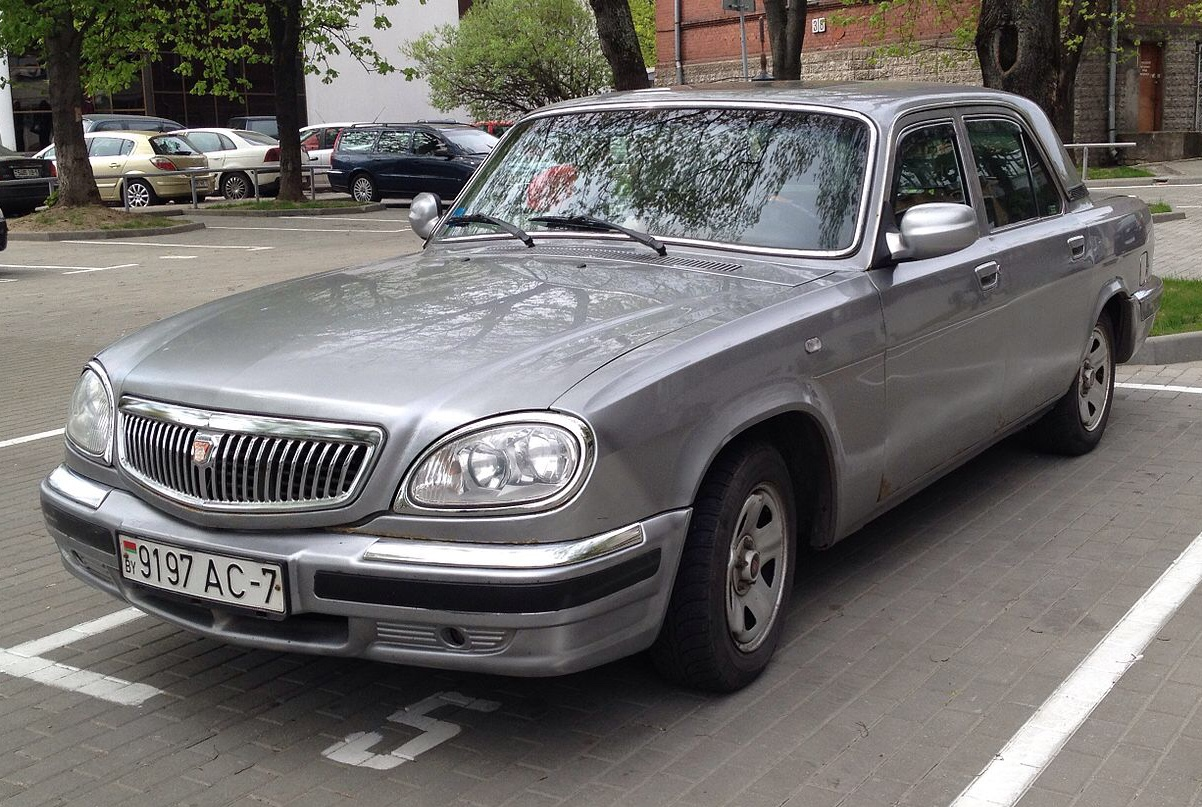

Overview
- Manufacturer: GAZ
- Production: 2004–2009
- Assembly: Russia: Nizhny Novgorod

Body and chassis
- Class: Mid-size
- Body style: 4-door saloon/sedan
- Layout: FR layout
- Related: GAZ-3102; GAZ-24; GAZ-31029; GAZ-3110

Powertrain
- Engine: 2.5 L ZMZ-4021 I4 (2003–2005); 2.3 L ZMZ-4062.10 I4 (2003–2005); 2.4 L Chrysler EDZ I4 (2006–2010); 2.5 L ZMZ-40525 I4 (2005–2010); 2.1 L GAZ-560 I4 diesel
- Transmission: 5-speed Manual (2004–2009); 4-speed Aisin Warner Automatic (2004–2010)

Dimensions
- Wheelbase: 2,800–3,100 mm (110.2–122.0 in)
- Length: 4,920–5,221 mm (193.7–205.6 in)
- Width: 1,812 mm (71.3 in)
- Height: 1,422 mm (56.0 in)
- Curb weight: 1,400-1,560 kg (3,086-3,439 Ib)

Chronology
- Predecessor: GAZ-3110
- Successor: Volga Siber

The GAZ-31105 Volga is an automobile manufactured by the Gorkovsky Avtomobilny Zavod (GAZ, Gorky Automobile Plant) from 2004 to 2009 as a generation of its Volga marque.

GAZ-31105 was a second stage of the GAZ-3110's modernisation, though the designation was applied to cars produced from January 2004, the mechanical features were introduced almost a year earlier, and certain external ones were available in separate batches as standard or optional in others.

== Technical details ==
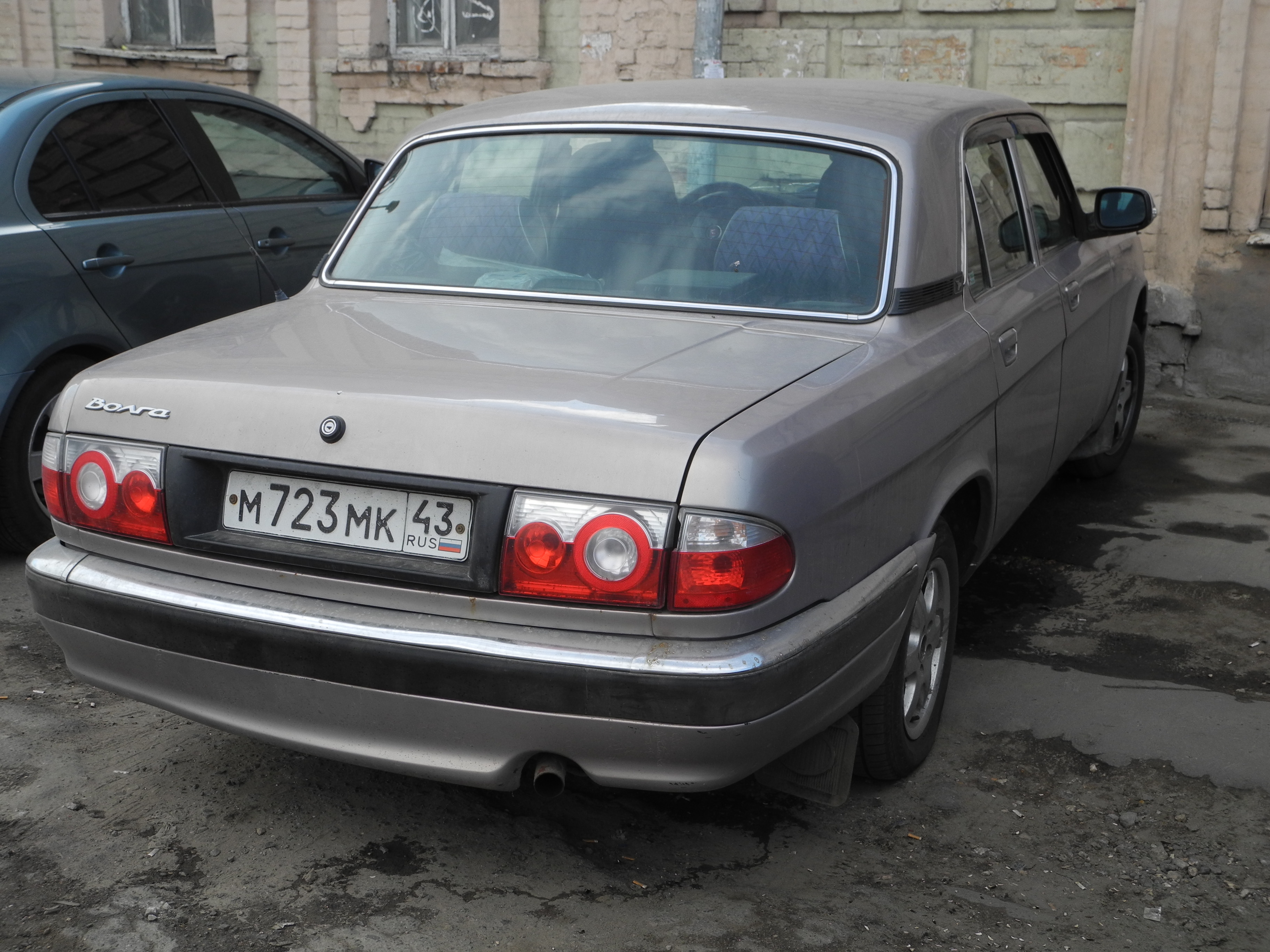
Rear view

The GAZ-31105 was changed from previous designs to include a new fascia with a drooping hood that integrated with the radiator grille into a single unit. This was surrounded by new block headlights, inspired by the 3111. It also featured a new digital instrument cluster on the dashboard. The steering column became more horizontal and greater headroom resulted from thinner seats.

== Versions ==
In 2006 the standard engine selection was added with a Chrysler 2.4-litre DOHC engine.

In 2005 GAZ introduced a long-wheelbase GAZ-311055 luxury model, with a new interior that included wooden trim. The latter feature became standard on models produced from 2007 onwards when GAZ gave the car a minor facelift. Among the changes were completely new taillights and a conversion to Euro III standard with the introduction of its new 2.4 litre 152 hp ZMZ-40525 engine, complementing the Chrysler engine, with which the archaic ZMZ-4021 and ZMZ-4062.10 were phased out. The GAZ-31105 was available only as a saloon, with the estate continuing with the old GAZ-3110 styling.

Following the introduction of the Volga Siber in 2008 GAZ hoped to fully finish production on both the GAZ-3102 and the GAZ-31105 by 2010. The base design of both cars still traced its roots to the GAZ-24, thus ending a successful production run of 40 years.

In addition, pick-up truck and panel van models based on the GAZ-31105 were also built by outside companies in small numbers. One particular example is the GAZ 17310 "Trofim", which was built by Gidroprivod in Kimovsk in a cooperation with GAZ. This cooperation started in 2003 and production eventually ended in 2007.
