= List of GAZ vehicles =

This is a list of vehicles designed or produced by GAZ, a Russian carmaker based in Nizhny Novgorod.

== Current ==
- Cars
  - Volga C50 (from 2026; rebadged Geely Xingrui)
  - Volga K40 (from 2026; rebadged Geely Atlas)
  - Volga K50 (from 2026; rebadged Geely Xingyue L)
- Minibuses and vans
  - GAZelle NEXT
  - GAZelle Business
    - GAZ-3302 GAZelle mass production light 1.5t commercial truck with R4 engine (from 1994)
    - GAZ-33023 GAZelle "Farmer" - light 1.3t commercial truck double cab (from 1996)
    - GAZ-33027 GAZelle - 4x4 light 1.3t truck (from 1996)
  - Sobol 4x4
  - Sobol Business
  - GAZ Sobol NN (from 2022)
- Light-duty trucks
  - GAZ-2310 ″Sobol″ - light commercial 1t pickup truck (from 1999)
  - GAZ-A31 GAZelle NEXT - light 1.5t commercial truck (from 2013)
  - GAZ-A32 GAZelle NEXT - light 1.3t commercial truck double cab (from 2015)
- Medium-duty trucks
  - GAZon NEXT
    - GAZ-C41 GAZon NEXT - 4x2 medium duty 5t truck (from 2015)
    - GAZ-C42 GAZon NEXT City - 4x2 medium duty 5t truck (from 2016) - version with low frame
  - Valdai NEXT (from 2020)
  - Sadko-NEXT (from 2014)
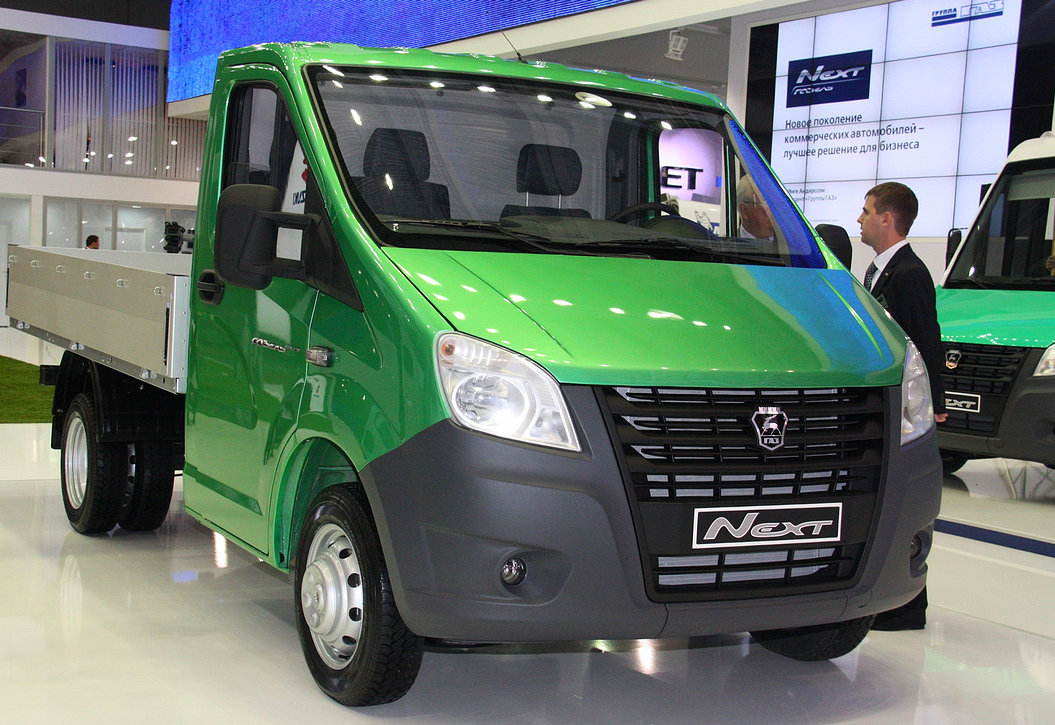
GAZelle NEXT

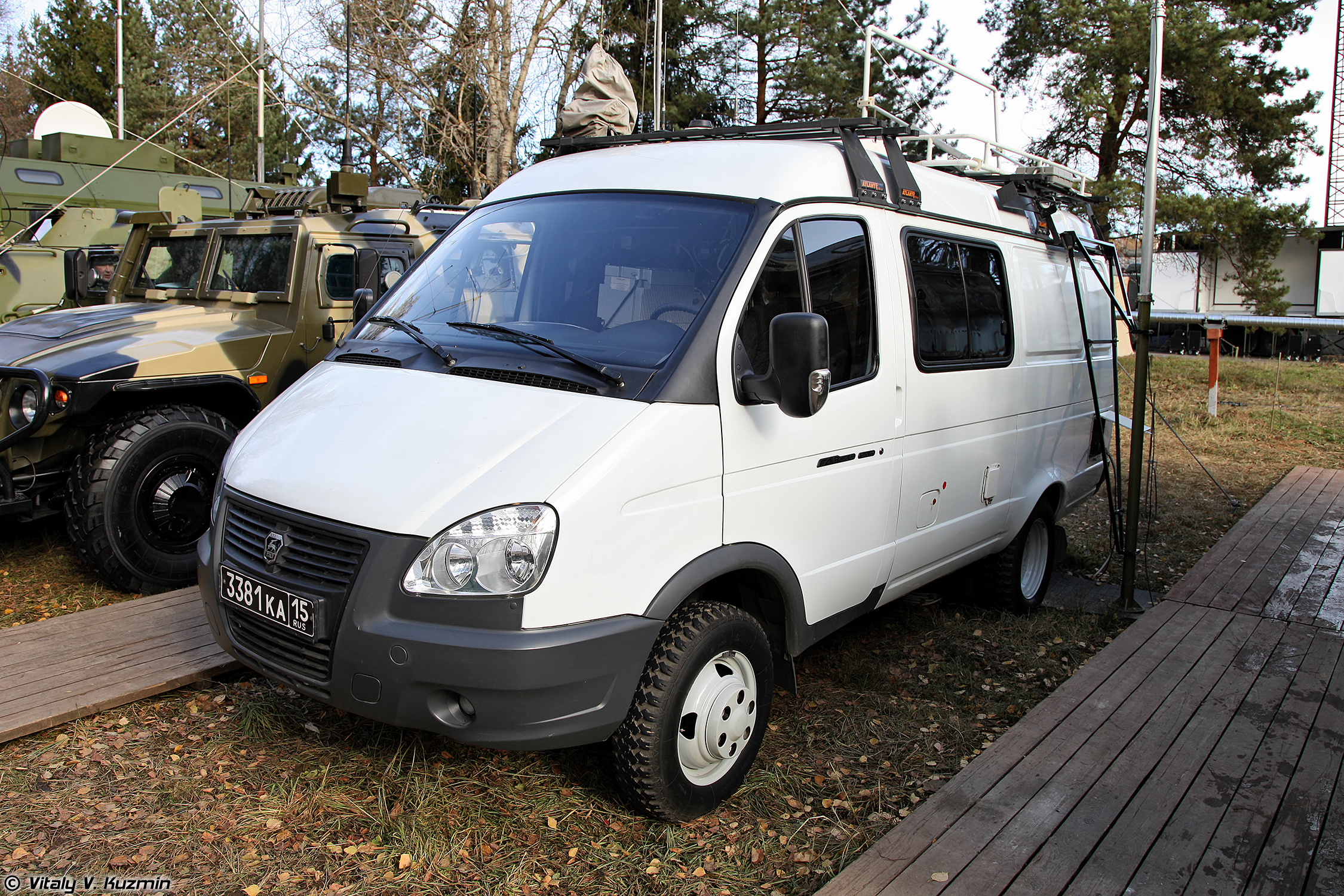
GAZelle Business

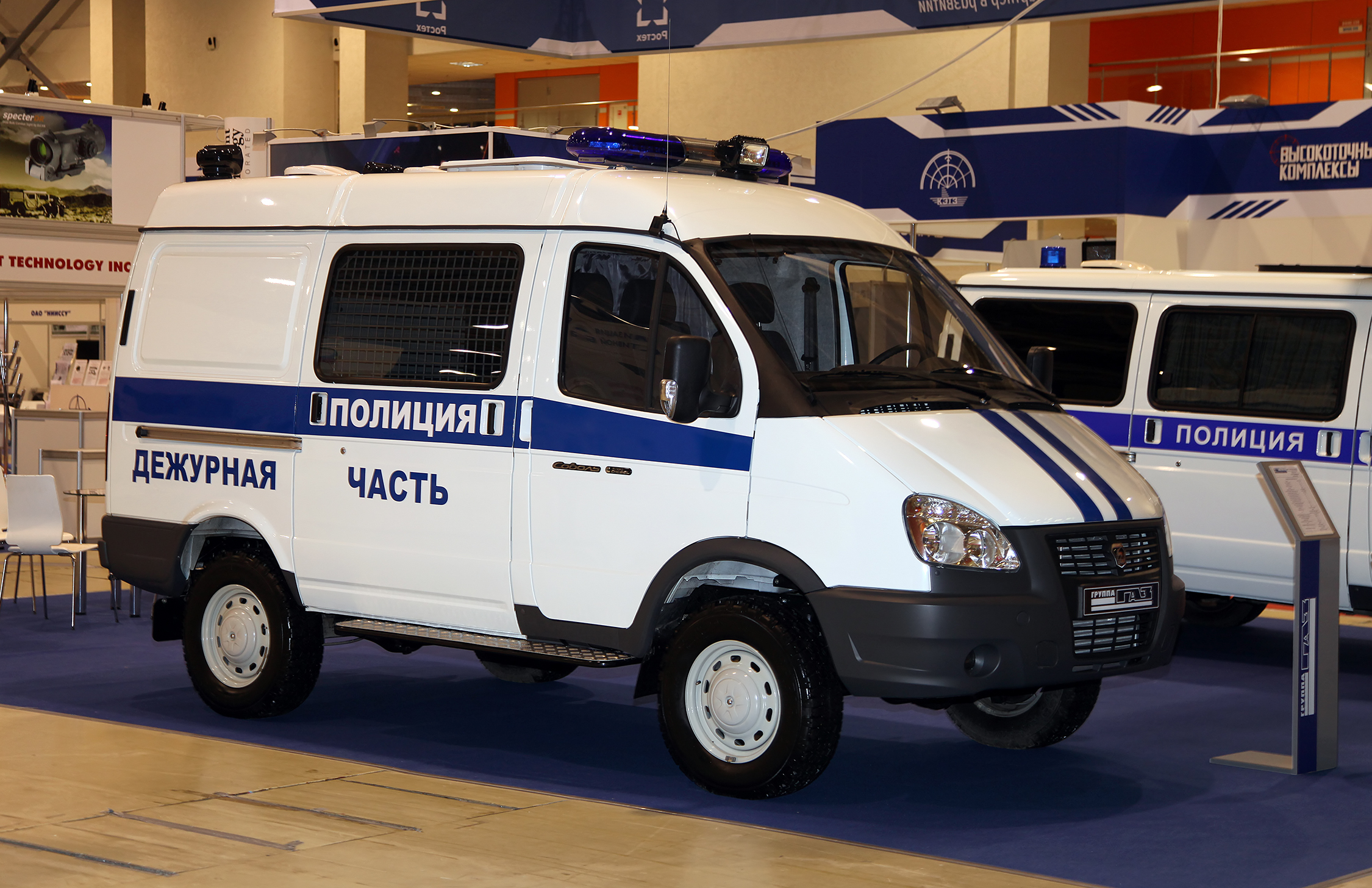
Sobol 4x4

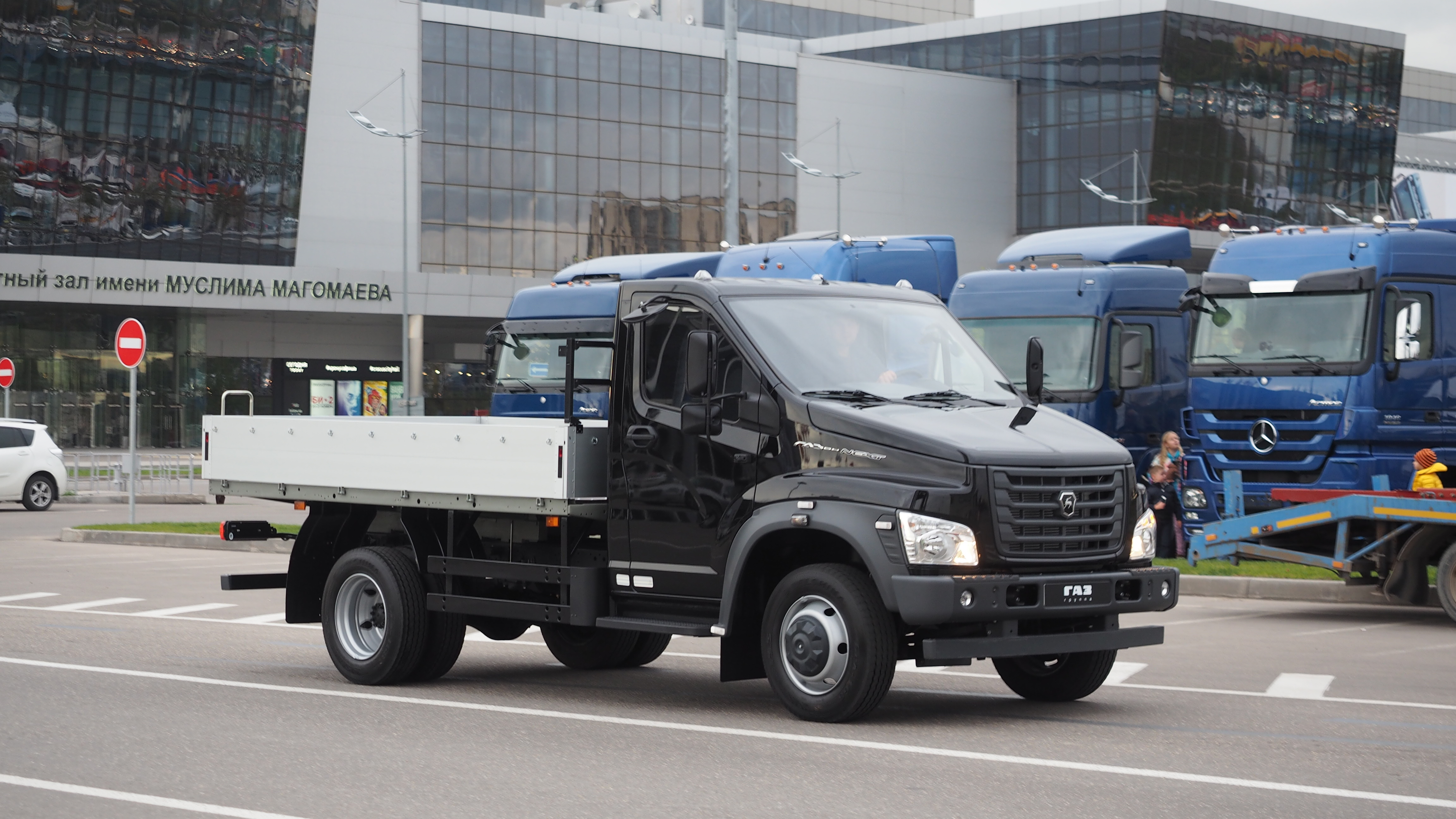
GAZon Next

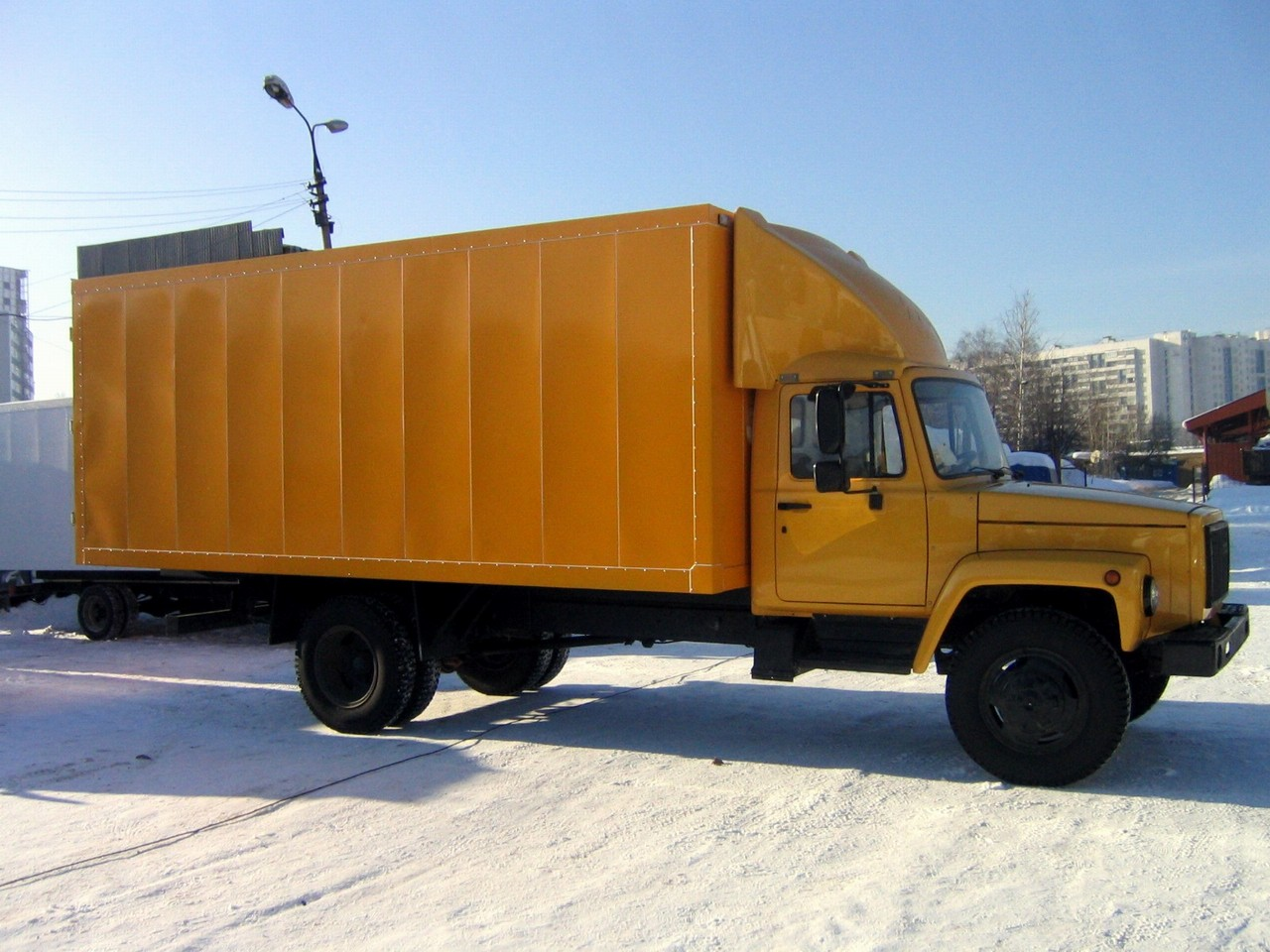
GAZ-3309

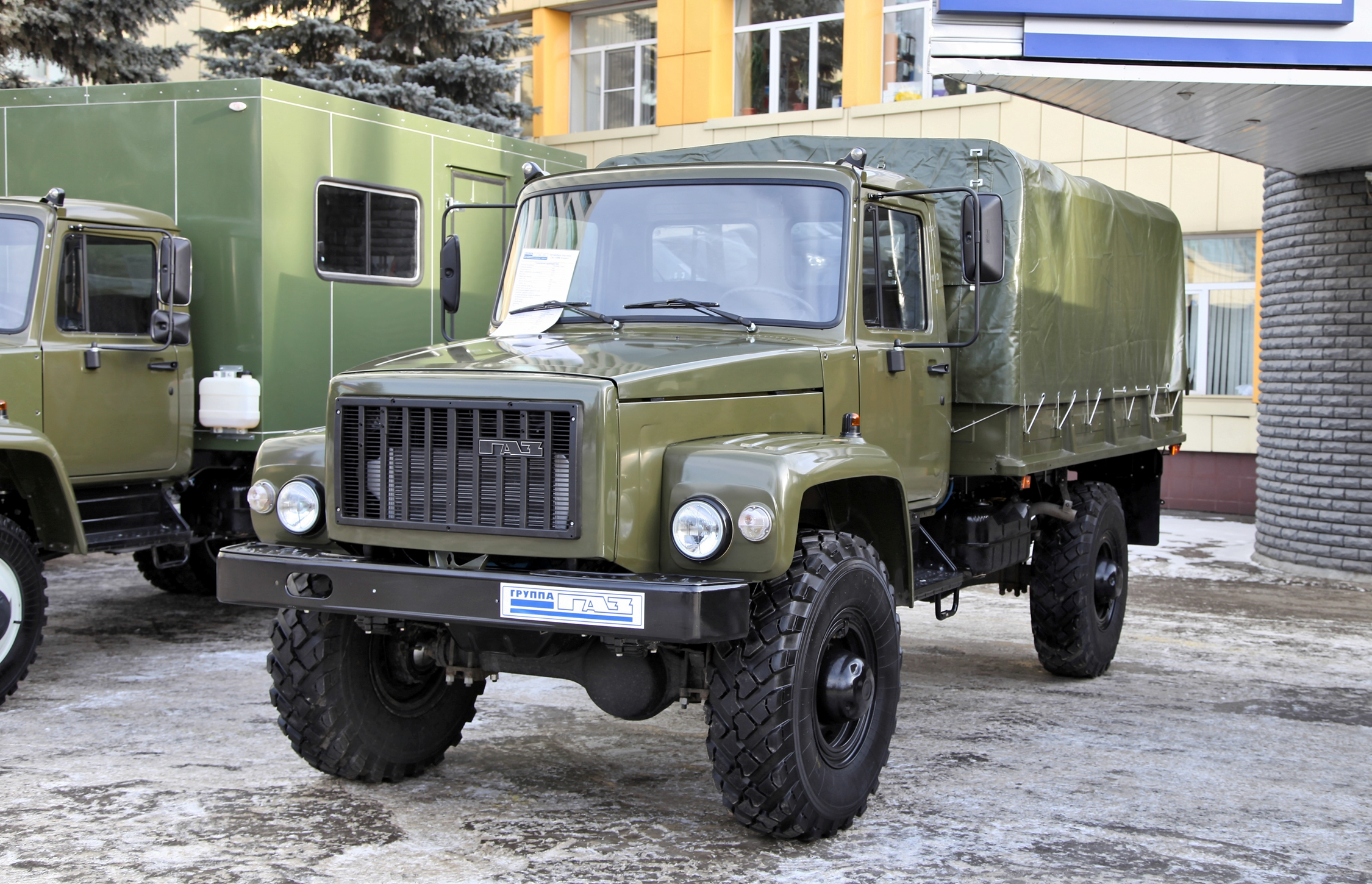
GAZ Sadko

== Past models ==
=== Trucks ===
- GAZ-AA - mass production 1.5t truck (1932–1938); license-built Ford Model AA
- GAZ-4 - 0.5t pickup truck (1933–1937) - based on GAZ-A
- GAZ-AAA (initially known as GAZ-30) - 6x4 2t truck (1934–1944) - three axle version of GAZ-AA
- GAZ-14 - truck (1935-1936) - wood gas powered with V-5 gas generator
- GAZ-AAAA - three-axle (6x4) truck prototype (1936) - based on GAZ-A
- GAZ-40 - prototype truck (1936) - based on GAZ-AA; wood gas powered with NATI-11 and V-5 based generator
- GAZ-410 (initially called GAZ-S1) - dump truck (1936–1950) - based on GAZ-AA, then the GAZ-MM
- GAZ-М415 - 0.5t pickup truck (1937–1941) - based on GAZ-M1
- GAZ-21 - prototype three axle (6x4) pickup truck (1938) - based on GAZ-M1
- GAZ-22 - prototype three-axle truck (1938?) - shortened GAZ-21
- GAZ-41 - truck (1937-1938) - based on GAZ-AA; wood gas powered with NATI-G14 generator
- GAZ-MM - 0.5t truck (1938–1947) - improved GAZ-AA
- GAZ-AAA-1 (initially known as GAZ-31) - three-axle truck (1938); army version of GAZ-AAA
- GAZ-07 - three-axle truck (1938-?) - shortened GAZ-AAA
- GAZ-44 - truck (1938, 1940-1941) - based on GAZ-AA but powered by compressed gas
- GAZ-11-51 - prototype truck (1939); predecessor of GAZ-51
- GAZ-63 - prototype truck (1939-1943) - AWD version of GAZ-11-51
- GAZ-33 - truck (1939) - three-axle version of GAZ-63
- GAZ-43 - truck (1939) - based on GAZ-AA; coal gas powered with NATI-G21 generator
- GAZ-905 - utility tractor based on GAZ-AA (1939-1944, 1947-1948)
- GAZ-42 - truck (1939–1945, 1946) - improved GAZ-41
- GAZ-34 - prototype truck (1940) - LWB version of GAZ-33
- GAZ-11-415 - prototype pickup truck (1940); M415 with GAZ-11 I6 engine
- GAZ-62 - prototype 4x4 truck (1940)
- GAZ-32 - SWB version of GAZ-33 (1940)
- GAZ-61-415 - prototype AWD pickup truck (1941) - based on GAZ-61-40
- GAZ-61-416 - 4x4 army pickup truck (1941) - open cab version of GAZ-61-415
- GAZ-R1 - 4x4 field car - prototype for GAZ-64 (1941)
- GAZ-22 - prototype tractor based on T-40 tank with GAZ-MM cab (1941)
- GAZ-45 - prototype truck (1941) - based on GAZ-MM but powered by LPG
- GAZ-64 - 4x4 field car (1941–1943)
- GAZ-SKh - prototype snowmobile truck (1942, 1945) - based on GAZ-MM
- GAZ-67-420 - prototype closed RWD version of GAZ-67 (1943)
- GAZ-63 - first prototype for GAZ-63 (1943)
- GAZ-67 - 4x4 field car - improved GAZ-64 (1943–1953)
- GAZ-51 - 2.5t truck (1946–1975)
- GAZ-68 - prototype artillery tractor (1948); cancelled in favor of the GAZ-63, but ultimately led to the GAZ-62
- GAZ-63 truck - (1947–1968) - 2t truck - 4x4 version of GAZ-51
- GAZ-62 - prototype 4x4 army truck (1952)
- GAZ-900 - airfield radio truck (1952); based on ZiS-151
- GAZ-56 (MkI) - prototype light 1.5t commercial truck with original steel cab & R4 engine (1953)
- GAZ-50 - plant tractor (1953); based on GAZ-69
- GAZ-69 - 4x4 pickup 0.5t truck (1953–1956), production moved to UAZ
- GAZ-69A - 4x4 field car (1954–1956), production moved to UAZ
- GAZ-M73 - prototype light pickup version of 4x4 car GAZ-M72 (1955)
- GAZ-56 (MkII) - prototype light 1.5t commercial truck with GAZ-52 cab & R4 engine (1958)
- GAZ-62 - 4x4 air-transportable 1.2t military cabover truck (1959–1962)
- GAZ-93A - 2t dump truck (1958–1975) - based on GAZ-51
- GAZ-52 - mass production 2.5t truck (1961–1989) with carbureted R6 (GAZ-51) engine
- GAZ-53F - 4x2 medium duty 3t truck with carbureted R6 (GAZ-51F, 82HP) engine (1961–1967)
- GAZ-53 - 4x2 medium duty 3.5t truck with carbureted V8 engine (1964-1965) - basic model
- GAZ-53A - 4x2 medium duty 4t truck with carbureted V8 engine (1965-1983) - improved GAZ-53
- GAZ-53-12 - 4x2 medium duty 4.5t truck with carbureted V8 engine (1983-1993) - improved GAZ-53A
- GAZ-33 - prototype 7t 6x4 truck (1966)
- GAZ-66/66-01 - 4x4 cabover military 2t truck with carbureted V8 engine (1964–1996)
- GAZ-54 - redesigned GAZ-53 (early 1970s)
- GAZ-66-21 - 4x4 cabover civilian 3t truck (1993–1995) - agricultural version of GAZ-66-40
- GAZ-66-40/66-41 - 4x4 cabover military 2t truck with diesel engines (1992–1999)
- GAZ-3301 - prototype 4x4 cabover military 2.5t truck with diesel engine (1987); based on GAZ-66
- GAZ-2304 ″Burlak″ pickup 0.7t (van) concept - based on car GAZ-31029 (1992)
- GAZ-2307 "Ataman" - 4x2 light 0.8 truck concept - based on cab GAZ-3307 (1995)
- GAZ-2308 "Ataman" - 4x4 light 0.7t truck concept - based on cab GAZ-3307 (1996)
- GAZ-2169 "Combat" - SUV concept (2000)
- GAZ-3120 "Combat" - SUV concept (2002)
- GAZ-2975 Tigr - prototype for GAZ-2330 (2002)
- GAZ-2330 Tigr - 4x4 all terrain truck (from 2006)
- GAZ-3306 - 4x2 medium duty 3t truck with diesel R4 (85HP) engines (1992-1995) - light duty version of GAZ-4301
- GAZ-3307 GAZon - 4x2 mass production medium duty 4.5t truck (1989-2014) - version with carbureted V8 engine
- GAZ-4301 - 4x2 medium duty 5t truck with diesel R6 (125HP) engine (1986-1995)
- GAZ-4509 - 4.5t dump truck (1992–1995) - based on GAZ-4301
- GAZ-3308 "Sadko" - 4x4 military 2t truck (1997-2020) - 4x4 version of GAZ-3307 with single rear wheels
- GAZ-3309 GAZon - 4x2 mass production medium duty 4.5t truck (1994-2020) - version with turbodiesel engine
- GAZ-3310 "Valdai" - 4x2 medium duty 3.5-4t truck (2004-2015) - concept "Valdai" was shown in 1999

=== Passenger cars ===
- GAZ-A - 4-door phaeton car (1932–1936) under license Ford Model A (1929)
- GAZ-6 ″Pioneer″ - prototype closed sedan car (1934)
- GAZ-M1 - closed sedan car (1936–1943) - based on 1933 Ford B40
- GAZ-25 - prototype 6x4 sedan (1938) - based on GAZ-M21
- GAZ-M45 - GAZ-M1 powered by LPG (1938-1941)
- GAZ-11-40 - prototype 4-door phaeton version of GAZ-11-73 (1940)
- GAZ-61-40 - 4x4 passenger car with 4-door phaeton body (1940), made only 5 copies
- GAZ-11-73 - closed sedan with GAZ-11 engine (1940–1943, 1945–1946) - based on GAZ-M1
- GAZ-M1 V8 - NKVD V8 sedan with Ford V8 (1937–1941) - based on GAZ-M1
- GAZ-61-73 4x4 passenger car (1941–1945) - the world's first 4x4 sedan with a closed body
- GAZ-M20 - ″Pobeda″ passenger car (1946–1948, 1949–1955)
- GAZ-26 - prototype for GAZ-12 ZIM (1948)
- GAZ-M20V - improved ″Pobeda″ passenger car (1955–1958) (in Russian)
- GAZ-М72 - ″Pobeda″ 4x4 passenger car (1955–1958) (in Russian)
- GAZ-M73 - prototype pickup-truck version of GAZ-M72 (1955) - later produced as the Moskvitch 410
- GAZ-M20G - ″Pobeda″ I6 KGB car (1956–1958)
- GAZ-21 - ″Volga″ sedan (1956–1970)
- GAZ-18 - invalid car prototype (1959)
- GAZ-22 - Volga station wagon (1962–1970)
- GAZ-23 - Volga V8 KGB sedan (1962–1971)
- GAZ-24 - Volga sedan (1968–1985)
- GAZ-24-01 - Volga sedan Taxi (1970–1985) from GAZ-24
- GAZ-24-07 - Volga sedan Taxi with LPG (1977–1985) from GAZ-24-01
- GAZ-24-02 - Volga station wagon (1972–1986) from GAZ-24
- GAZ-24-03 - Volga Ambulance wagon (1973–1986) from GAZ-24-02
- GAZ-24-04 - Volga station wagon Taxi (1973–1984) from GAZ-24-02
- GAZ-24-24 - Volga V8 KGB sedan (1971–1986) from GAZ-24
- GAZ-3102 - Volga sedan (1982–2010)
- GAZ-3101 - Volga V8 KGB luxury (escort, bodyguard) sedan (1984–1991)
- GAZ-24-10 - Volga sedan (1985–1992) - improved GAZ-24
- GAZ-24-11 - Volga sedan Taxi (1985–1992) from GAZ-24-10
- GAZ-24-17 - Volga sedan Taxi with LPG (1985–1992) from GAZ-24-11
- GAZ-24-12 - Volga station wagon (1986-1993) from GAZ-24-10
- GAZ-24-13 - Volga Ambulance wagon (1986–1993) from GAZ-24-12
- GAZ-24-34 - Volga V8 KGB sedan (1986–1991) from GAZ-24-10
- GAZ-3105 - 4WD Volga luxury sedan (1992-1996) - all new platform to replace GAZ-14 Chayka
- GAZ-31029 - Volga sedan (1992–1997) - restyling GAZ-24-10
- GAZ-31022 - Volga station wagon (1993-1998) from GAZ-31029
- GAZ-31023 - Volga Ambulance wagon (1993-1998) from GAZ-31022
- GAZ-3103 - prototype front-wheel-drive version of GAZ-3104 (1998) - all new platform to replace GAZ-3110
- GAZ-3104 - prototype 4WD version of GAZ-3103 (1998) - all new platform to replace GAZ-3102
- GAZ-3110 - Volga sedan (1997–2004) - restyling GAZ-31029
- GAZ-3111 - Volga sedan (1998-2002, 2004)
- GAZ-310221 - Volga station wagon (1998-2008) from GAZ-3110
- GAZ-310231 - Volga Ambulance wagon (1998-2008) from GAZ-310221
- GAZ-3111 - RWD Volga luxury sedan (2001–2004)
- GAZ-31105 - Volga sedan (2004-2009) - restyling GAZ-3110
- GAZ-311055 - Volga LWB sedan (2005-2007) from GAZ-31105
- Volga Siber - mid-class sedan based on Chrysler Sebring platform (2008–2010)
- Volga C40 - mid-class sedan, rebadged Changan Raeton Plus (2024) - never produced
- Volga K30 - compact crossover, rebadged Changan X5 Plus (2024) - never produced

=== Full-size luxury cars ===
- GAZ-12 ZIM - big sedan (1950–1960)
  - GAZ-12A - prototype phaeton version of GAZ-12
  - GAZ-12B - ″ZIM″ ambulance (1951-1960)
- GAZ-13 Chaika - limousine (1959–1981)
  - GAZ-13B - ″Chaika″ 4-door phaeton car (1961-1962), special edition, made only 20 copies
  - GAZ-13S - ″Chaika″ station wagon (1968-?)
- GAZ-14 Chaika - limousine (1977–1988)
  - GAZ-14-01 - version for civilians
  - GAZ-14-02 - version for civilians
  - GAZ-14-03 - version for Ministry of Defense
  - GAZ-14-04 - version for Ministry of Defense
  - GAZ-14-05 - ″Chaika″ 4-door phaeton for military parades (1978)
  - GAZ-14-06
  - GAZ-14-07 (later GAZ-4106) - prototype modernized version of GAZ-14 (mid-1980s)

=== Panel van ===
- GAZ-19 - prototype van (1955) - based on GAZ-69
- GAZ-2332 CityVan (2006) - light van prototype
- GAZ-2705 - GAZelle cargo van (from 1995)
- GAZ-2752 - Sobol cargo van (from 1998)

=== Halftracks ===
- GAZ-TK (1933–1934) - based on GAZ-A
- GAZ-VM - prototype; based on GAZ-M1
- GAZ-60 (1938–1946)
- GAZ-65 (1940) - based on GAZ-MM
- GAZ-66 (1940) - prototype; based on GAZ-AAA
- GAZ-41 (1949-1953) - prototype; based on GAZ-51
- GAZ-47 - off-road vehicle (1954–1967)

=== Buses ===
- GAZ-1 (1932) - based on GAZ-AA
- GAZ-2 (1933) - based on GAZ-AA
- GAZ-03-30 (initially GAZ-3) bus (1933–1941, 1945-1950) - based on GAZ-AA
- GAZ-03-32 (1937) - ambulance version of GAZ-03-30
- GAZ-5 (1935) - based on GAZ-AA
- GAZ-05-193 staff bus (1936–1945) - based on GAZ-AAA
- GAZ-05-194 (?-1938) - ambulance version of GAZ-05-193
- GAZ-13 (1935) - based on GAZ-AA
- GAZ-55 ambulance (1938–1950) - based on GAZ-AA
- GAZ-71 (1947) - based on GAZ-51
- GAZ-71V prototype forward-control bus (1949) - production moved to GZA
- GAZ-3221 - GAZelle passenger van (from 1996)
- GAZ-22171 - Sobol passenger van (from 1998)
- GAZ-2217 - Barguzin passenger van (from 1999)

=== Trailers ===
- GAZ-704 - trailer for GAZ-69; production transferred to UAZ in 1956
- GAZ-707 - cotton trailer for GAZ-63 (1958-1962)
- GAZ-711 - trailer for GAZ-53-05 (1966)
- GAZ-901 - trailer for GAZ-900

=== Armoured cars ===
- BA-3 armored car (1933–1935)
- BA-6 medium armoured car (1936–1938)
- BA-10 middle armoured car (1939–1941) - based on GAZ-AAA
- LB-62 prototype armored car (1942) - based on GAZ-62
- BA-64 light armoured car (1942–1943)
- BA-64B light armoured car (1943–1946)
- BA-64Z prototype light armored snowmobile (1943)
- GAZ-40 - BTR-40 armoured personnel carrier (1950–1960)
- GAZ-49 - BTR-60 armored personnel carrier (1960–1976)
- GAZ-64-126 - semi-armoured car prototype (1942) - based on GAZ-64
- GAZ-4905 - BTR-70 armored personnel carrier (1976–1986)
- GAZ-5903 - BTR-80 armored personnel carrier (from 1986)
- VPK-3927 Volk - tactical high-mobility multipurpose military armored vehicle
- GАZ-3934 "Siam" - armored police vehicle
- GAZ-5923 - Rostok (BTR-90) armored personnel carrier (from 2004 until 2010)
- VPK-7829 - Bumerang (VPK) armored personnel carrier (from 2011)

=== Self-propelled gun ===
- GAZ-68 - prototype (1944); based on GAZ-63

=== Tanks ===
- T-27 tankette (1931-1933)
- T-37A tank amphibious light tank (1933-1936)
- T-40 amphibious light tank (1940-1941)
- T-60 light tank (1941–1942)
- T-70 light tank (1942–1943)

=== Amphibians ===
- GAZ-011 amphibian prototype (1949); based on GAZ-67
- GAZ-48 amphibian prototype (1952)
- GAZ-46 MAV - light 4x4 amphibian (1952-??); based on GAZ-69
- GAZ-3937 - Vodnik amphibious 4x4 amphibian (from 1997)

=== Hovercraft ===
- GAZ-16 - prototype hovercraft (1962)
