= Yermak =

Yermak or Ermak may refer to:

== Places ==
- Aksu, Kazakhstan, a city in Kazakhstan, known as Yermak until 1993
- Yermak Point in Antarctica
- Yermak Stone, a cliff in Perm Krai, Russia

== People ==
- Yermak (name)

== Other ==
- GAZ Ermak, a Russian truck
- Yermak (1898 icebreaker), an Imperial Russian and later Soviet ship
- Yermak Angarsk, an ice hockey team in Angarsk, Russia
- Yermak Monument in Novocherkassk, Russia
- Yermak-McFaul Expert Group on Russian Sanctions, a group working on sanctions against Russia and Belarus in response to the 2022 Russian invasion of Ukraine
