= GAZ Ermak =

GAZ Ermak (Russian: Ермак) is a Russian truck, based on the GAZ Valdai. It was officially presented in October 2011 on "AgroTech-2011", created a test batch for testing. There are two prototypes: rear wheel drive with a 2.8 engine and all-wheel drive with a 3.8 engine. Serial production is scheduled for 2013.

Plans have been adjusted and the vehicle turned into a new family of medium-duty trucks GAZon-Next in different versions with cab from Gazelle NEXT, which should replace the models GAZ-3307, GAZ-3309 and GAZ-3308 Sadko. Issue will begin in September 2014. The family will be two versions with rear powered- for the city and the countryside, and one version with all-wheel drive.
