= 3120 =

3120 may refer to:

== In general ==
- AD 3120, a year in the 4th millennium
- 3120 BC, a year in the 4th millennium BC
- 3120, a number in the 3000 (number) range

== Places ==
- 3120 Dangrania, an asteroid in the Asteroid Belt, the 3120th asteroid registered
- Hawaii Route 3120, a state highway
- Louisiana Highway 3120, a state highway
- Texas Farm to Market Road 3120, a state highway

== Other uses ==
- Nokia 3120, a cellphone
- GAZ 3120, a Russian SUV; see List of GAZ vehicles
