= GAZ-2332 CityVan =

GAZ-2332/CityVan
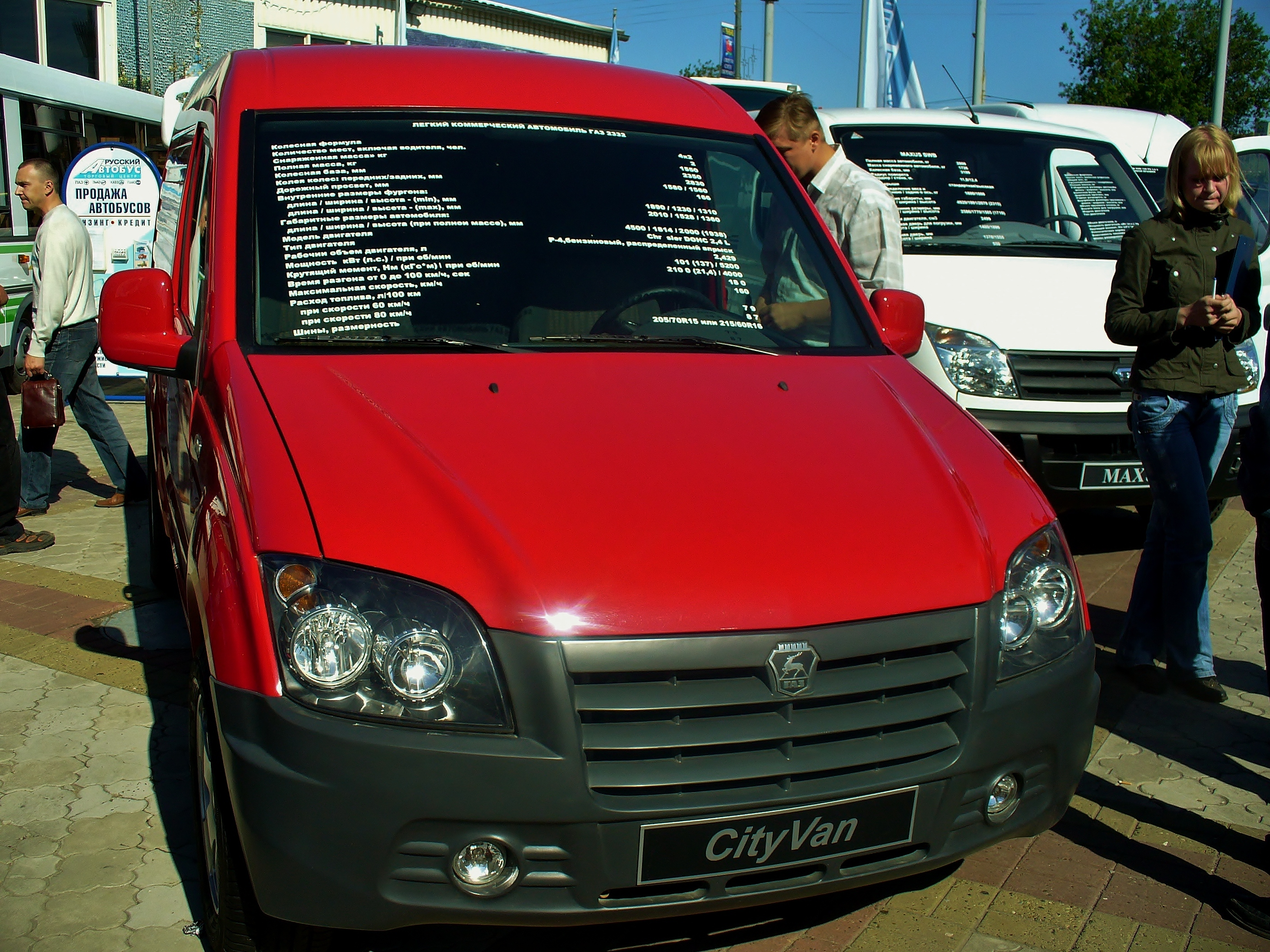

Overview
- Manufacturer: GAZ or Gorkovsky Avtomobilny Zavod
- Production: 2006
- Assembly: Nizhny Novgorod, Russia

Body and chassis
- Class: High roof light commercial vehicle

Powertrain
- Engine: 2492 cc (Chrysler) 4-cyl. OHC engine

Dimensions
- Wheelbase: 2,830 mm (111.4 in)
- Length: 4,500 mm (177.2 in)
- Width: 1,814 in (46,075.6 mm)
- Height: 2,000 mm (78.7 in)
- Kerb weight: 1,550 kg (3,417 lb) (laden)

The GAZ-2332 / GAZ CityVan (russ. ГАЗ-2332) was a light van developed by the Russian automaker GAZ and presented as a prototype at an apparently advanced stage of development in 2006.

== Overview ==
The van was shown with seating for two and a load area capable of carrying between 500 and 1,000 kg. It was powered by a 2492cc Chrysler petrol/gasoline engine producing a claimed maximum output of 137 PS (101 kW; 135 hp), using the same block as that fitted in the more powerful versions of the Volga Siber passenger car.

== Production ==
As well as the delivery van, the manufacturer intended to offer a passenger carrying version with seating for five. In 2006 it was foreseen that volume production would start in 2007, but a year later the company's finances had become more stretched and the GAZ CityVan has not entered production.
