= GAZ Sobol =

Russian light vehicle

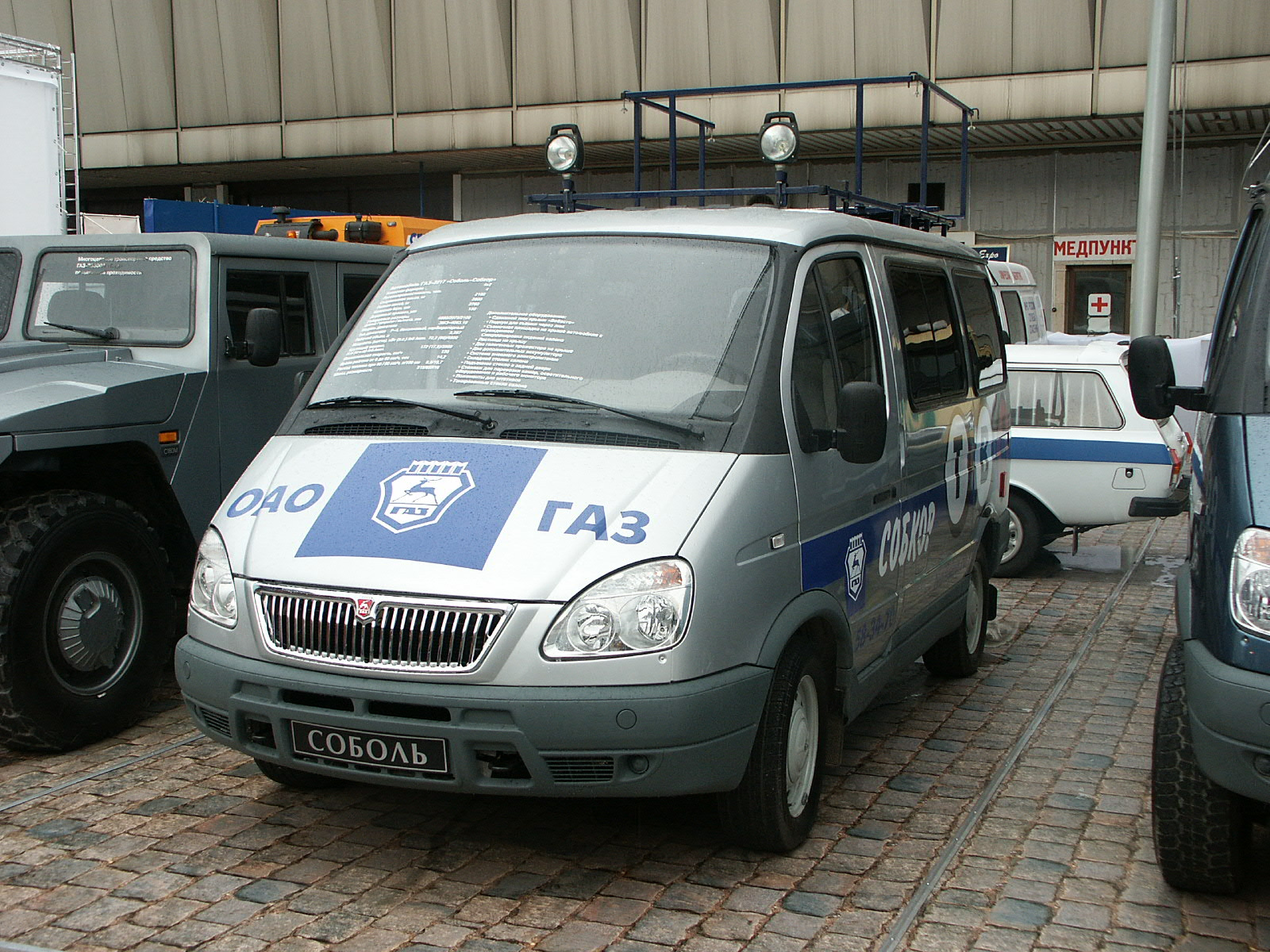

Overview
- Manufacturer: GAZ (Gorky Automobile Plant)
- Also called: GAZelle; GAZ Valdai
- Production: 1998–present
- Assembly: Russia: Nizhny Novgorod; Lithuania: Rokiškis (UAB "Automasinu verslo centras": 2000–2008); Ukraine: Kremenchuk (KrASZ: 2001–2008?); Ukraine: Simferopol, Autonomous Republic of Crimea (KrimAvtoGAZ: 1998–2006)

Body and chassis
- Class: Light commercial vehicle
- Body style: truck minibus
- Layout: FR layout

Powertrain
- Engine: Petrol: 2.3 L ZMZ-406 I4; 2.4 L Chrysler DOHC I4; 2.46 L ZMZ-405 I4; 2.5 L ZMZ-402 I4; 2.9 L UMZ-4216 I4; Diesel: 2.1 L GAZ-560 I4; 2.1 L GAZ-5601/5602 turbo I4; 2.8 L Cummins ISF2.8s4129P I4
- Transmission: 5-speed manual

Dimensions
- Wheelbase: 108.7 in (2,761 mm)
- Length: 189.4 in (4,811 mm) (minibus and panel van); 192.13 in (4,880 mm) (flatbed truck)
- Width: 81.7 in (2,075 mm) (minibus and panel van); 81.34 in (2,066 mm) (flatbed truck)
- Height: 87 in (2,210 mm)

The GAZ Sobol (Russian Соболь for Sable) is a series of Russian light-duty trucks, vans and minivans, produced by the Gorky Automobile Plant from November 1998. GAZ refers to the Sobol as a minivan.

== History ==
The GAZ Sobol is essentially a lighter version of the GAZelle with a shorter wheelbase. As such, the van has an 2760 mm wheelbase, a spring independent front suspension and a pent-tire rear axle, and designed for a smaller capacity (up to 900 kg). Previously, this market was largely unfilled by GAZ, as no factory-produced vehicle of such size and payload was built, with the exception of pick-up trucks and panel vans based on the GAZ Volga models, such as the GAZ-31105, which were built in small numbers by outside companies.

The Sobol is available as a panel van (GAZ-2752) or minibus (GAZ-2217) and (GAZ-22171 "Barguzine") minivan, as well as flatbed truck (chassis cab) (GAZ-2310). The basic model is GAZ-2752 van with a sliding side door and rear hinged (useful volume of 6.86 m^{3} (242 cu ft) 3-seater and 3.7 m^{3} (131 cu ft) in 7-seater cargo-"Combi").

Minibus GAZ-22171 with high roof (similar height "Gazelle" GAZ-3221) in the 6 and 10-seat versions. Since 1999 began production of the model 2217 "Sable Barguzine" with "low" roof (height reduced by 100 mm), lift gate back door, positioned by the manufacturer as a minivan. For business purposes and taxis designed 10-seat modification of GAZ-22173 with a more dense layout and simplified trim (available on request).

In the family of "Sable" and provided GAZ-23107/27527/22177/221717 all-wheel-drive version with rigid front axle and universal joints (joints Gukka) to drive forward driving and steering wheels. Transmission is made with permanent four-wheel drive transfer case with a chain driven mnogozvenchatoy Morse.

In early 2003 the family "Sobol" has undergone restyling, a similar family of "Gazelle" with the redesign of feathers and replacing the rectangular headlights on modern headlight unit teardrop shape, as well as the replacement of the instrument panel and so on.

In the 2006 assembly of the truck, "Sobol" GAZ-2310, before that produces only small quantities, was translated into a string of conveyor with side "Gazelle" GAZ-3302, significantly increasing the production of this model in demand, particularly in Moscow, because of restrictions on entry into the city center car carrying capacity of 1.0 tons.

In February 2010, GAZ began production restyling of the "Sobol-Business" family with a package of upgraded components and assemblies, the same family of " Business Gazelle ".

Since the end of 2010 "Sable-Business" also received a turbo Cummins ISF 2.8, since July 2010, is set to "Business Gazelle". Production of models lined the sample in 2003 and partially modernized units called "Sable-Standard" are stored only on a limited basis for modification of special purpose, certified for law enforcement agencies of the Russian Federation.

== Lineup ==
- GAZ-2217 - minivan, "Sobol Barguzine" (Баргузин) at 7 or 11 seats, with a low roof and lift gate back door
  - GAZ-22177 - minivan, "Sobol Barguzine" 4×4
- GAZ-22171 - minibus "Sobol" M1 and M2 for 7 or 11 seats with standard roof (1.5 m) and hinged rear swing doors
  - GAZ-221712 - Ambulance with low roof
  - GAZ-221717 - minibus "Sobol" M1 and M2 4×4
- GAZ-2310 - flatbed truck (4×2) carrying capacity of 0.9 tons, the option - chassis cab for the installation of add-ons such as wagon-box
  - GAZ-23107 - flatbed truck with 4×4 wheel drive transmission
- GAZ-2752 - panelvan carrying capacity of 0.8 tonnes with a sliding side door and rear double-doors, Optional combi for 7 persons with isolated cargo compartment
  - GAZ-27527 - panelvan wagon 4×4 variant - optional combi with 7 seats

== Engines ==
On vehicles of the family "Sobol", as in "Gazelle", initially (until 2006) used the following engines:

- petrol engine family ZMZ-402 (working volume of 2.5 L, 8 valves),
- Petrol engine ZMZ-406.3 (working volume 2.3 L, 16 valves) and
- fuel-injected gasoline engine ZMZ-406 (2.3 L, 16 valves) with a capacity of 100-110 PS, and
- available on request: GAZ-560 diesel (2.1 liter), 85 PS.

Since 2006 the Sobol uses injection engines with Euro-2 emissions:

- ZMZ 40522.10 (2.5 L, 16 valves) 140 PS and
- GAZ-5601 turbo 95 PS,

In 2008 - fuel injected engines with Euro-3 emissions controls were:

- ZMZ-40524.10 and
- Chrysler DOHC 2.4L (2.4 L, 137 PS),
- turbo-GAZ 5602 95 PS

Since 2009 the family "Sobol" is equipped with the following powerplants:

- UMP 4216.10 (2.89 liters, 115 PS), and

From autumn 2010 also comes with a turbodiesel Cummins ISF 2.8L (128 PS).

== Gallery ==
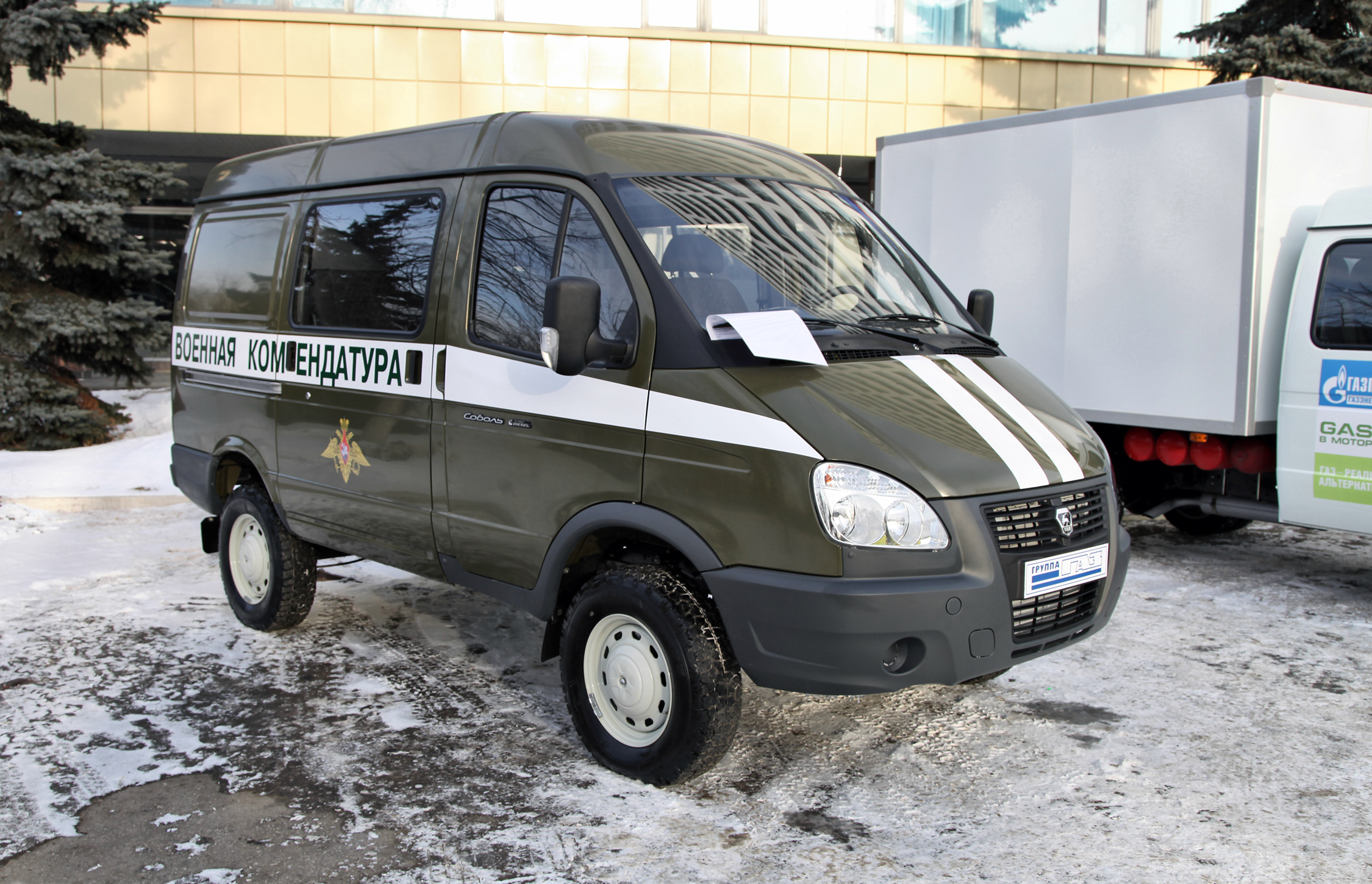
A GAZ-27527 as a Russian Military Commandant's Service inspection vehicle

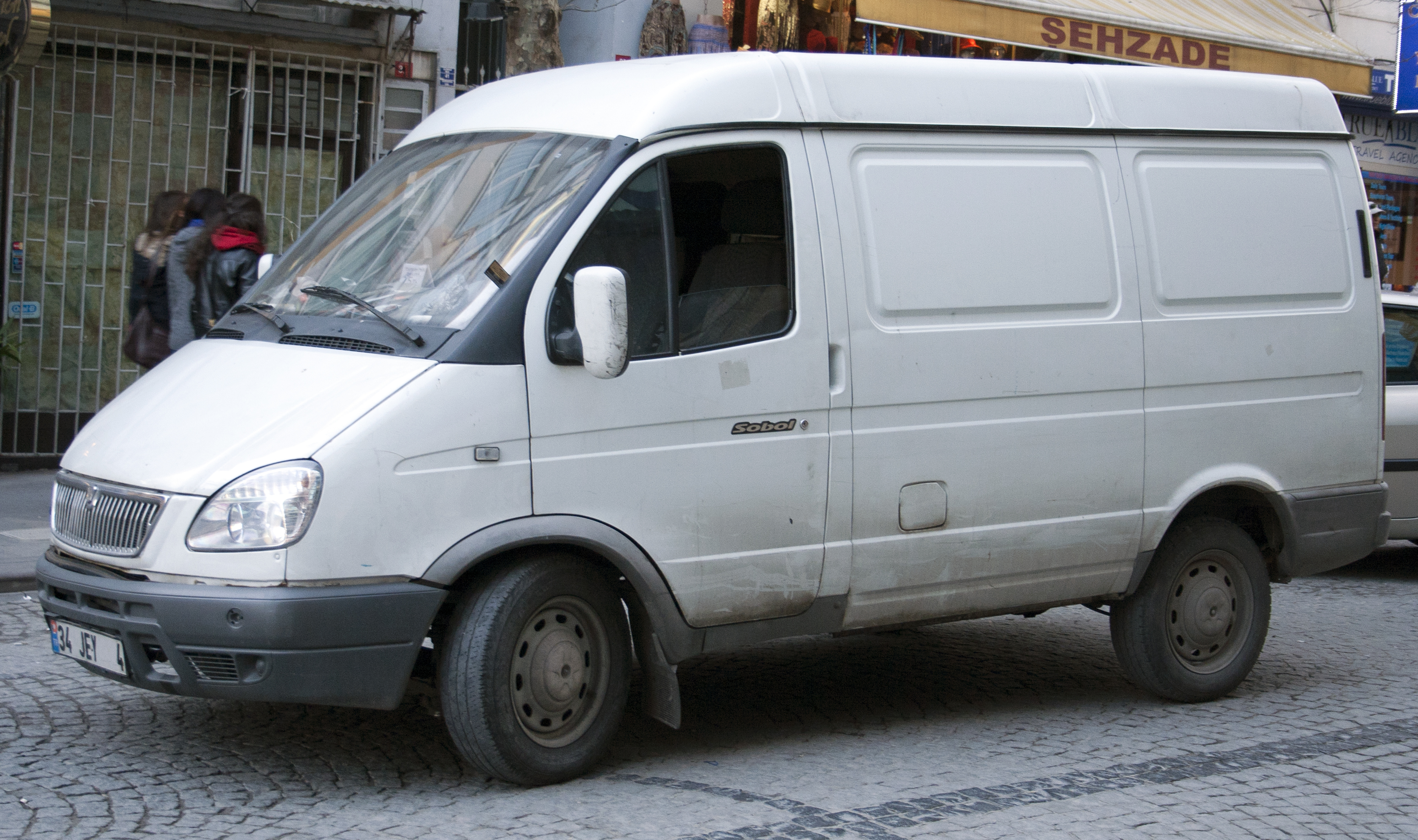
A Sobol panel van in Istanbul

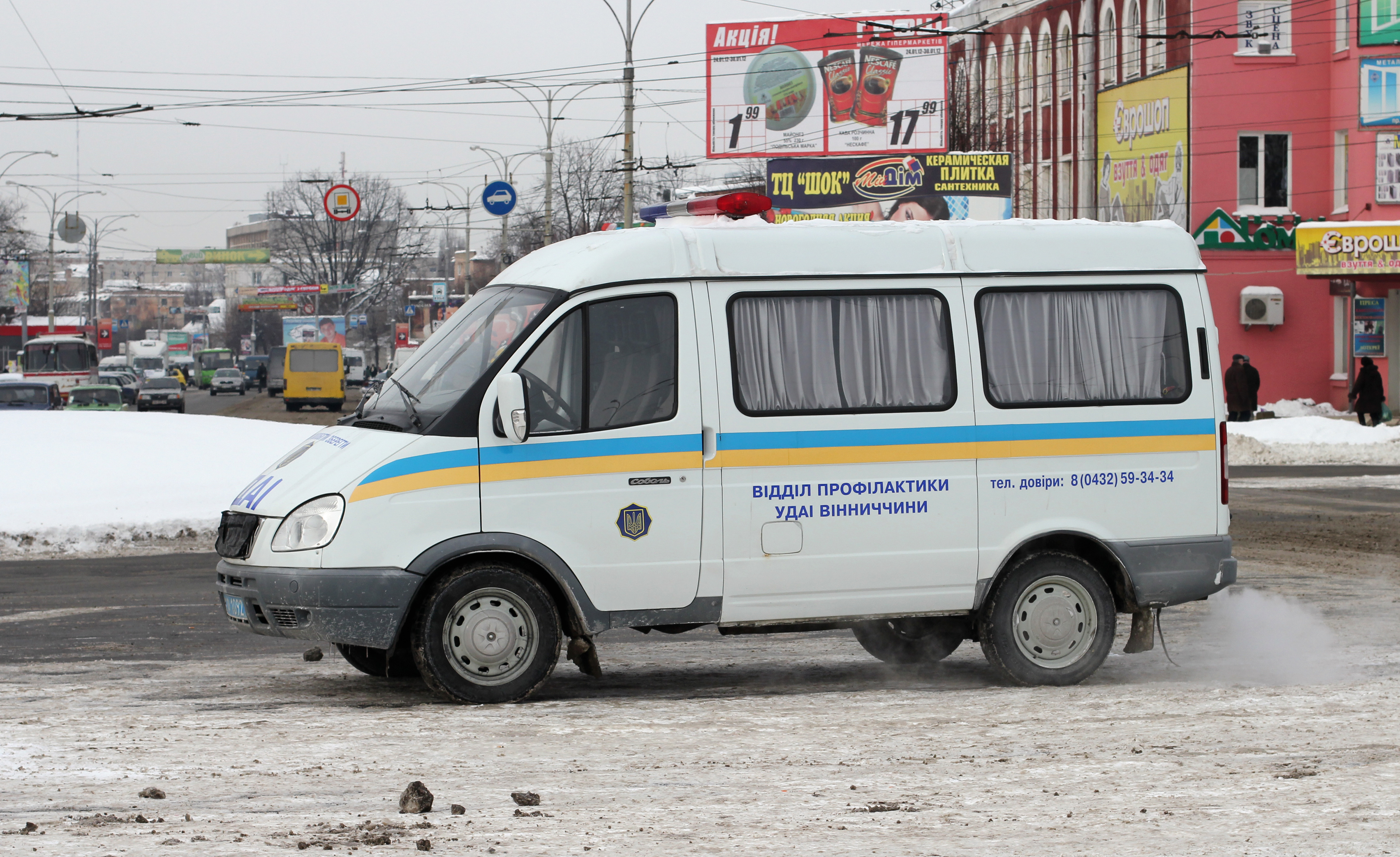
A Sobol as a Ukraine Road Police vehicle

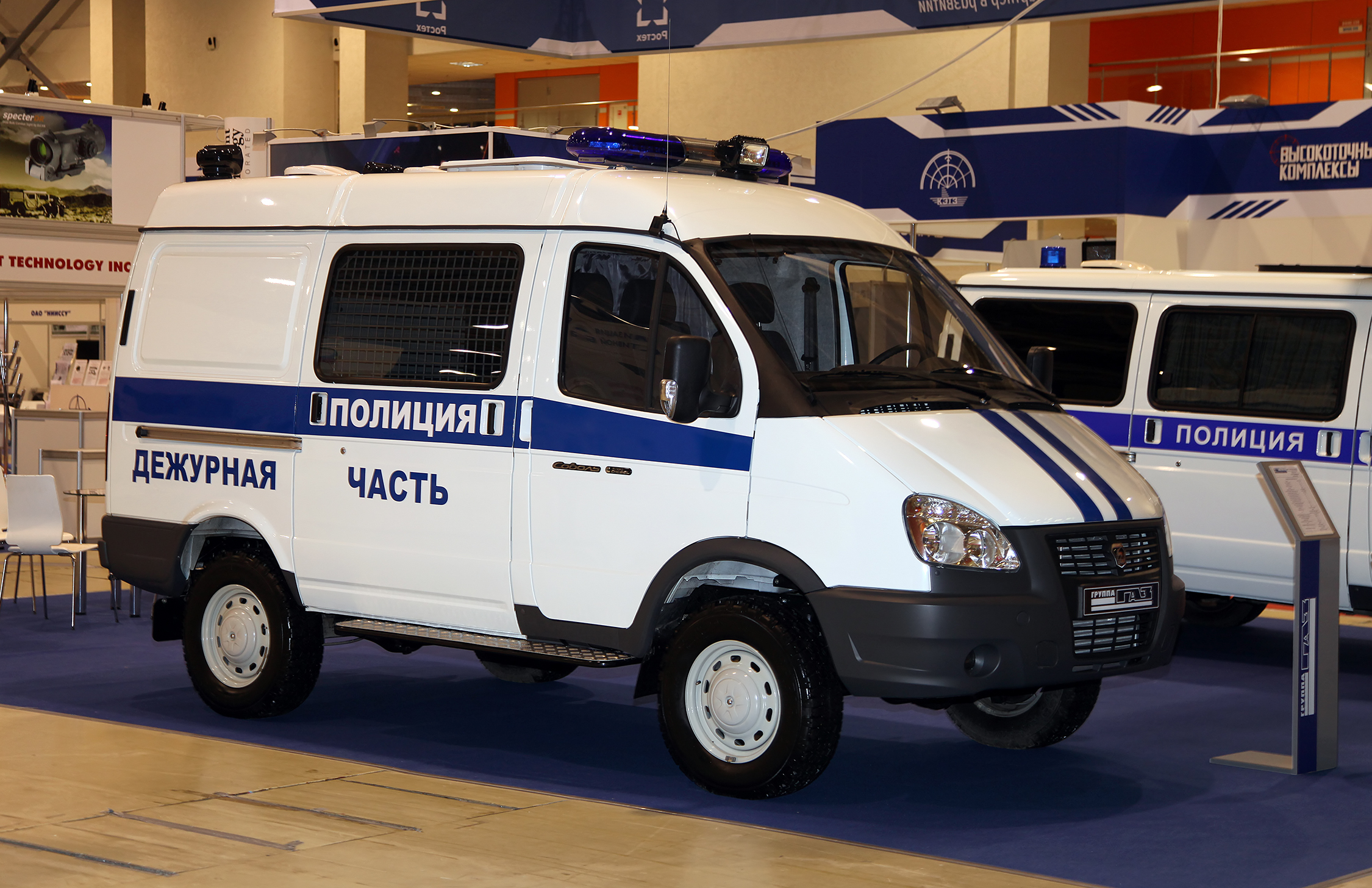
A Sobol police van

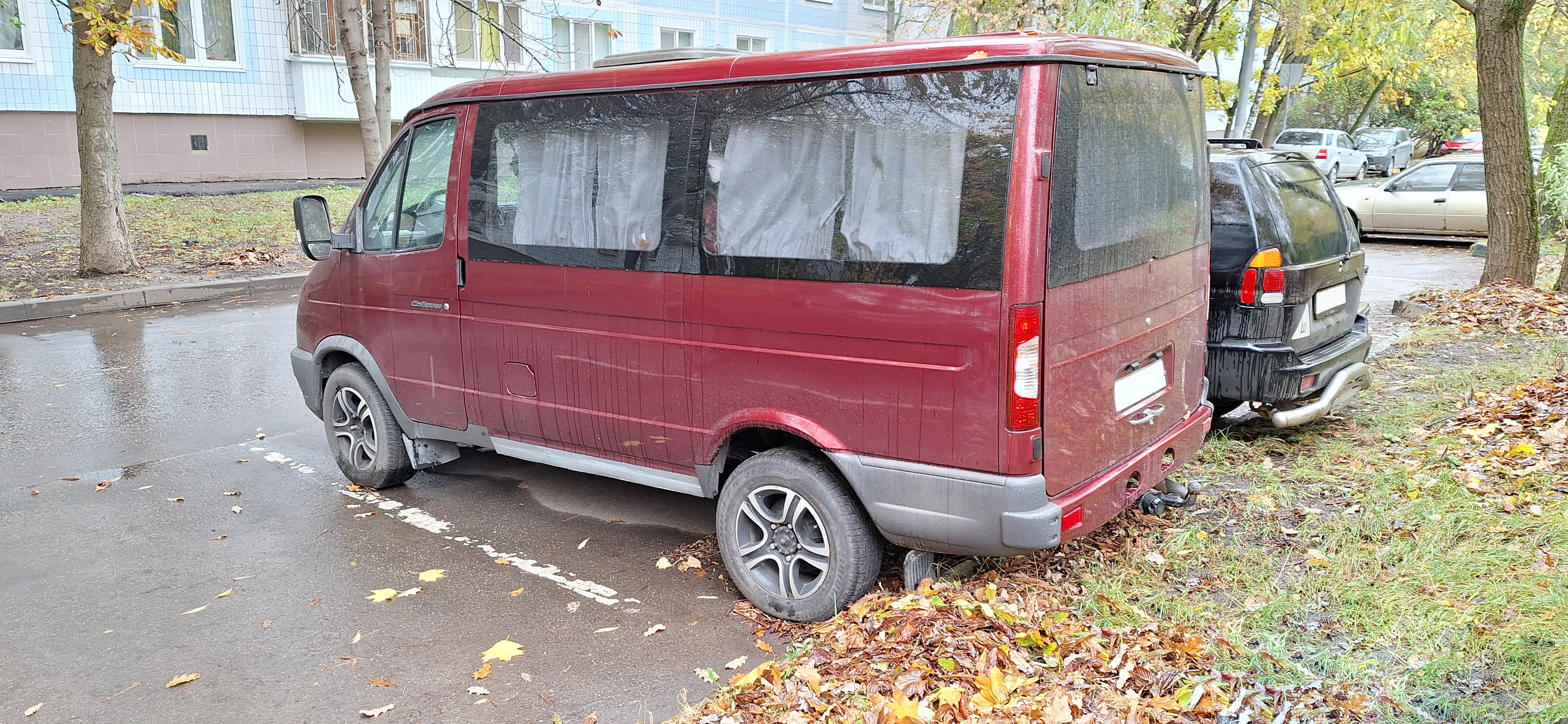
"Barguzin" in the "Lux" configuration.

== Sobol NEXT and NN ==
The "GAZ Sobol NEXT" and "GAZ Sobol NN" (for "New NEXT") are modernized versions of the GAZ Sobol which are now based on the GAZelle NEXT. As such, the van became more comfortable and is fitted with a more powerful engine, a 2.8-liter Cummins turbodiesel.

Also at the ComTrans exhibition in 2019, the concept of the new Sobol 4x4 (GAZ-27527-363) was also presented.

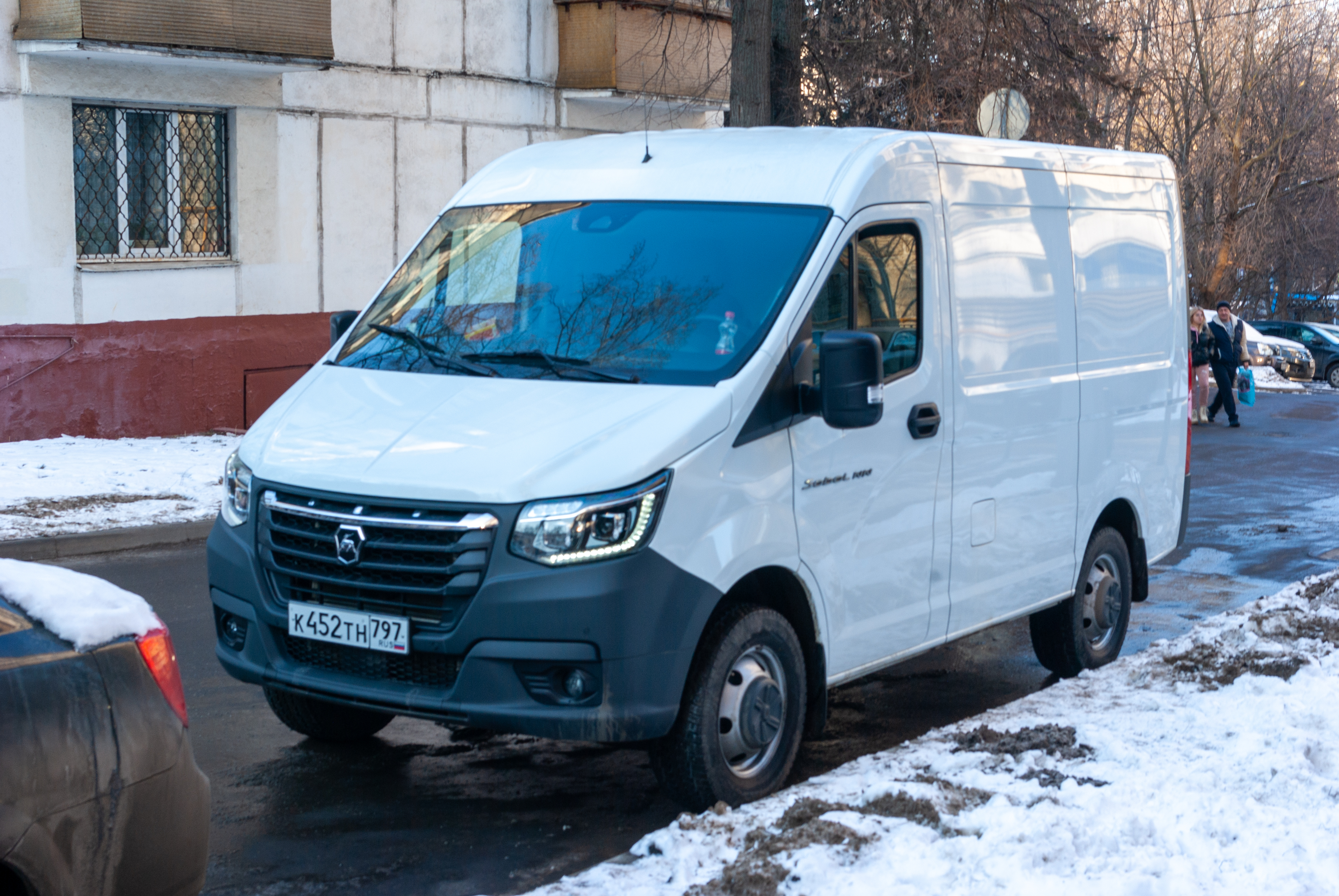
GAZ Sobol NN

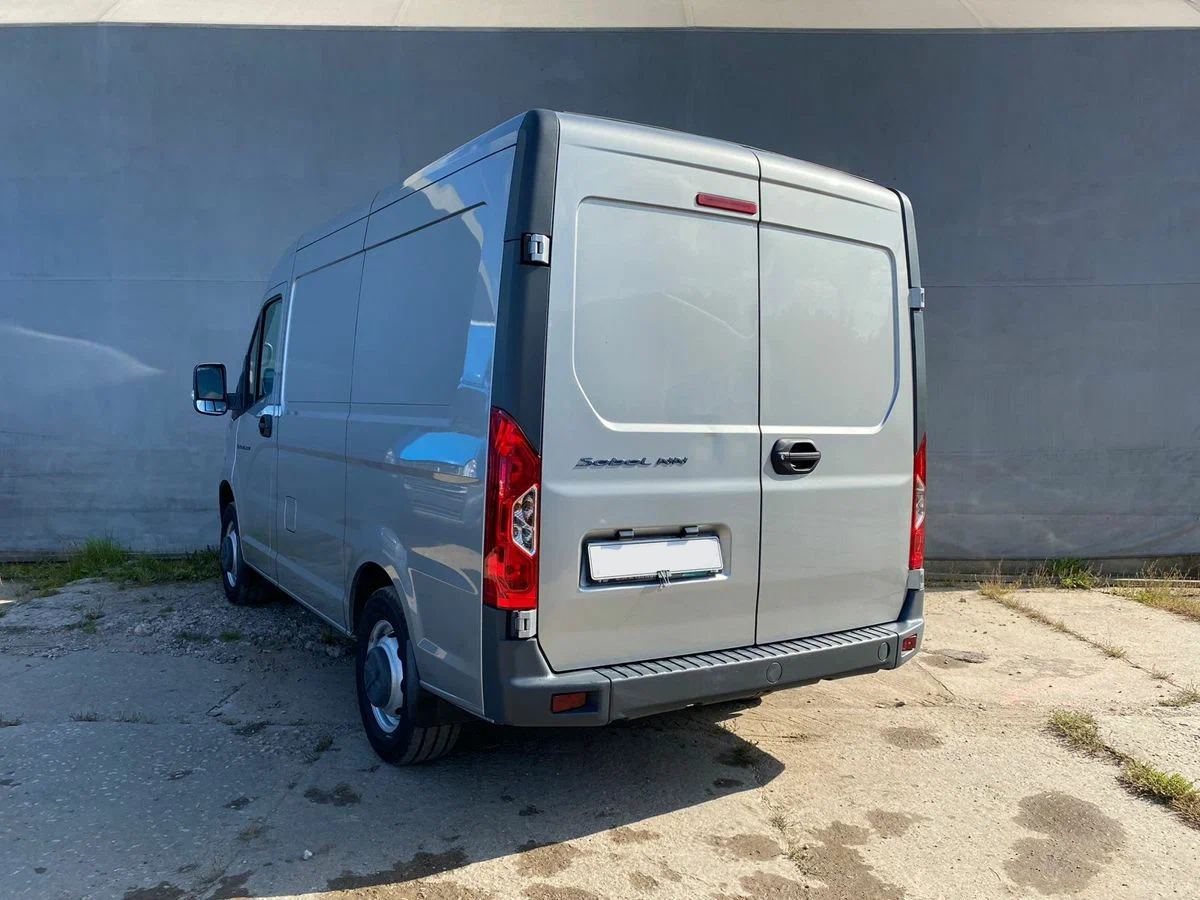
Sobol NN (back)

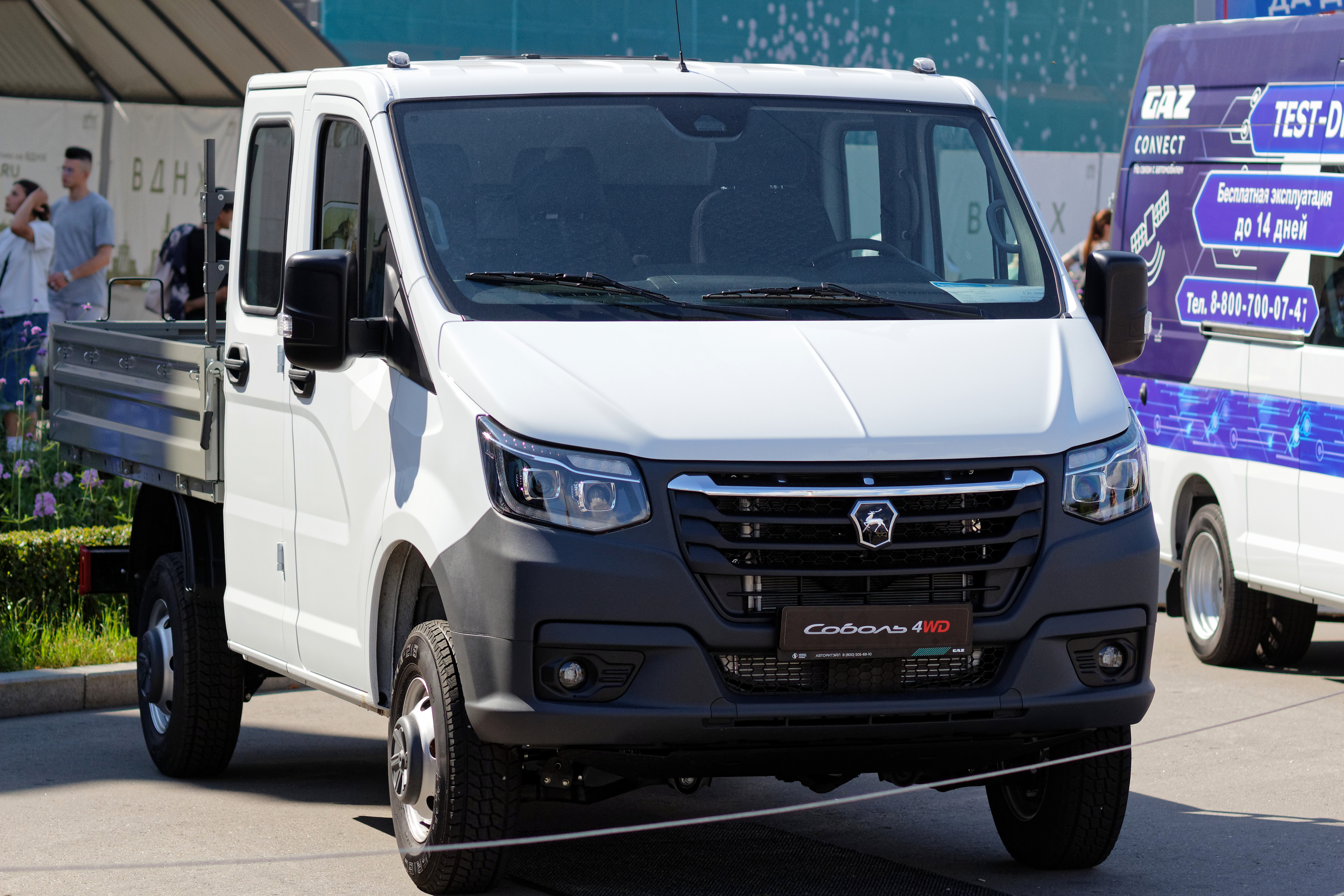
Sobol NN 4x4 Pickup

== See also ==
- GAZelle - a variant with a larger wheelbase and payload
- GAZelle Next - a modernized and restyled version of the GAZelle
