= Yermak (name) =

Yermak, Ermak or Jermak (Russian: Ермак; Ukrainian: Єрмак) is both a given name and a surname. Notable people with the name include:

- Yermak Timofeyevich (born between 1532–1542), Russian explorer and conqueror of Siberia
- Andriy Yermak (born 1971), Ukrainian lawyer, film producer and politician
- Bronislav Yermak (born 1970), Russian businessman, banker and pilot. Died in a plane crash while piloting a Yakovlev Yak-52 in 2009
- Dmitry Jermak (born 1983), Russian actor
- Gennady Ermak (born 1963), Soviet-born scientist and writer
- Lolita Yermak (born 1996), Ukrainian ice dancer
- Maksim Yermak (born 1976), Russian and Ukrainian footballer
- Oleh Yermak (born 1986), Ukrainian footballer
- Pavel Jermak (born 1911), Soviet hero of WWII
- Roman Jermak (born 2004), Kazakh Hockey Player
- Stanislav Jermak (born 1939), Russian military man and rocket and space systems scientist
- Vladimir Jermak (born 1924), Soviet hero of WWII
