= GAZ Valdai =

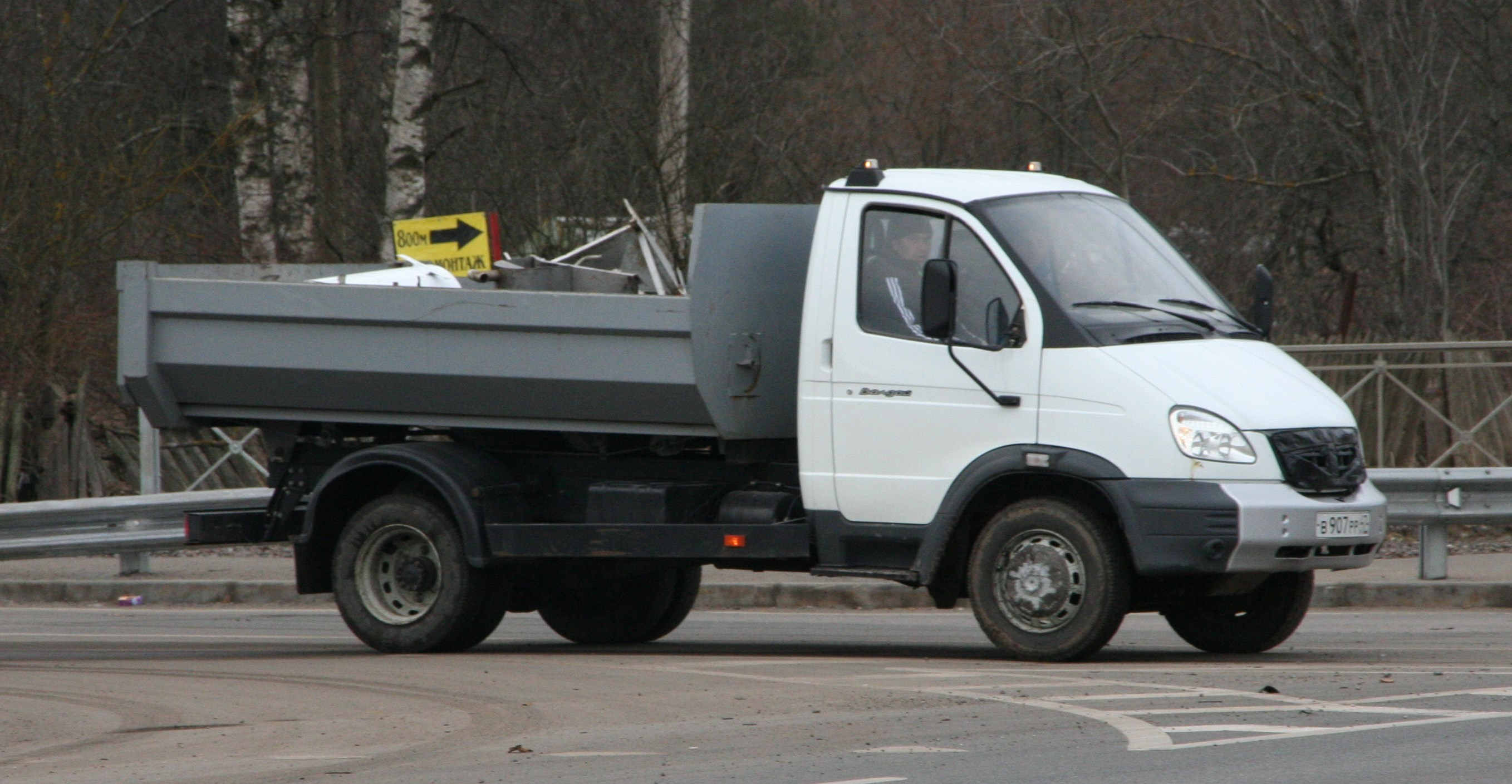

Overview
- Manufacturer: Gorky Automobile Plant
- Also called: GAZ Sobol; GAZ GAZelle
- Production: 2004–2015; 2020–present (Valdai NEXT)
- Assembly: Russia: Nizhny Novgorod; Lithuania: Rokiškis (UAB “Automasinu verslo centras”: 2003–2008)

Body and chassis
- Class: Medium truck
- Body style: flatbed truck pickup truck box truck
- Layout: FR layout

Powertrain
- Engine: 4.75 L diesel MMZ D-245.7E3 Straight-4; 3.76 L diesel Cummins LSF Straight-4
- Transmission: 5-speed manual

The GAZ-3310 Valdai (Russian: Валдай) is a medium-class flat bed truck (category N2 MCV) formerly produced from late 2004 until 2015 at the Gorky Automobile Plant in Russia. It differs from the "GAZelle" light commercial vehicle in that it does require a category C driver's license. The production of the truck ended in December 2015. In 2020, a new generation of the Valdai was launched, called the Valdai NEXT.

== Manufacturing history ==
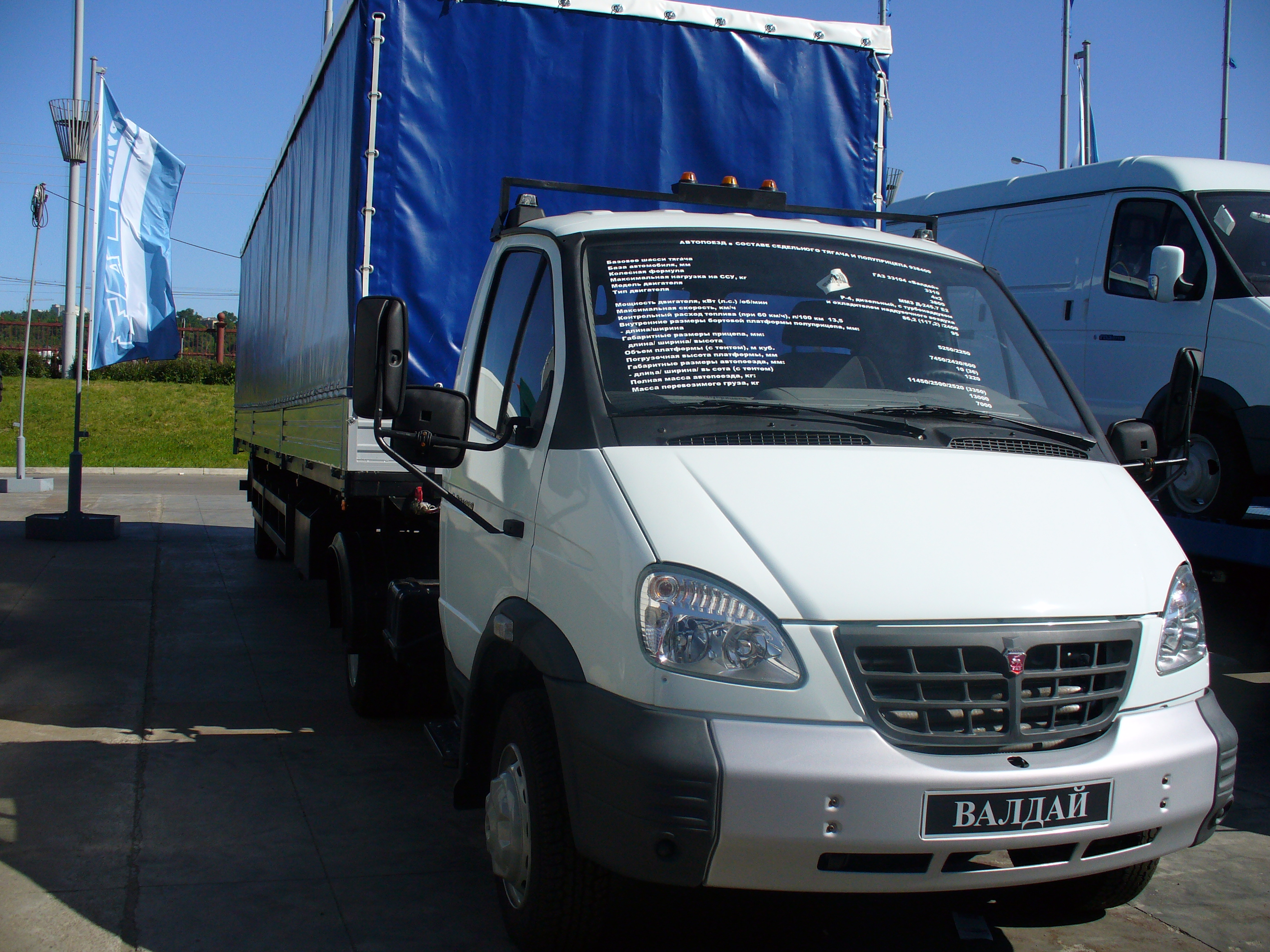
GAZ-33104V

The truck was developed during the 1990s. The truck is located above the GAZelle van and below the GAZ-3307 in terms of size. Mechanically, it is also a mix of these vehicles. As such, the chassis, suspension, and axles are derived from the GAZ-3307 truck, while the cab comes from the GAZelle van. The cab is very similar to that of the van, especially in terms of shape, but has some deviations that can be used to distinguish the vehicles. The GAZ-3310 has a larger grille and other rear-view mirrors that are not painted in the color of the cabin. Furthermore, the vehicle has two steps for boarding, one more than the GAZelle. The shape of the doors was also slightly varied.

In the first generation of vehicles from 2003/04 onwards, Russian-made diesel engines, namely the MMZ-D245 E2 model, were used. From 2010, the trucks were equipped with imported engines from Cummins Engine. There are versions with a single or extended cab, the number of seats (including driver) is either three or six. In addition, two different chassis were offered, the standard variant with a wheelbase of 3310 millimeters, and an extended model with 4000 millimeters. The steering system was supplied by ZF Friedrichshafen. Since 2010, the engine has been designed for a maximum mileage of 500,000 kilometers.

In late December 2015 with the last truck "Valdai" was produced. It was replaced by a new city 5-ton delivery truck GAZon NEXT City with low-profile wheels and low loading height, the production of which was launched in mid-2015.

== GAZ-3310 Valdai ==
=== Versions ===
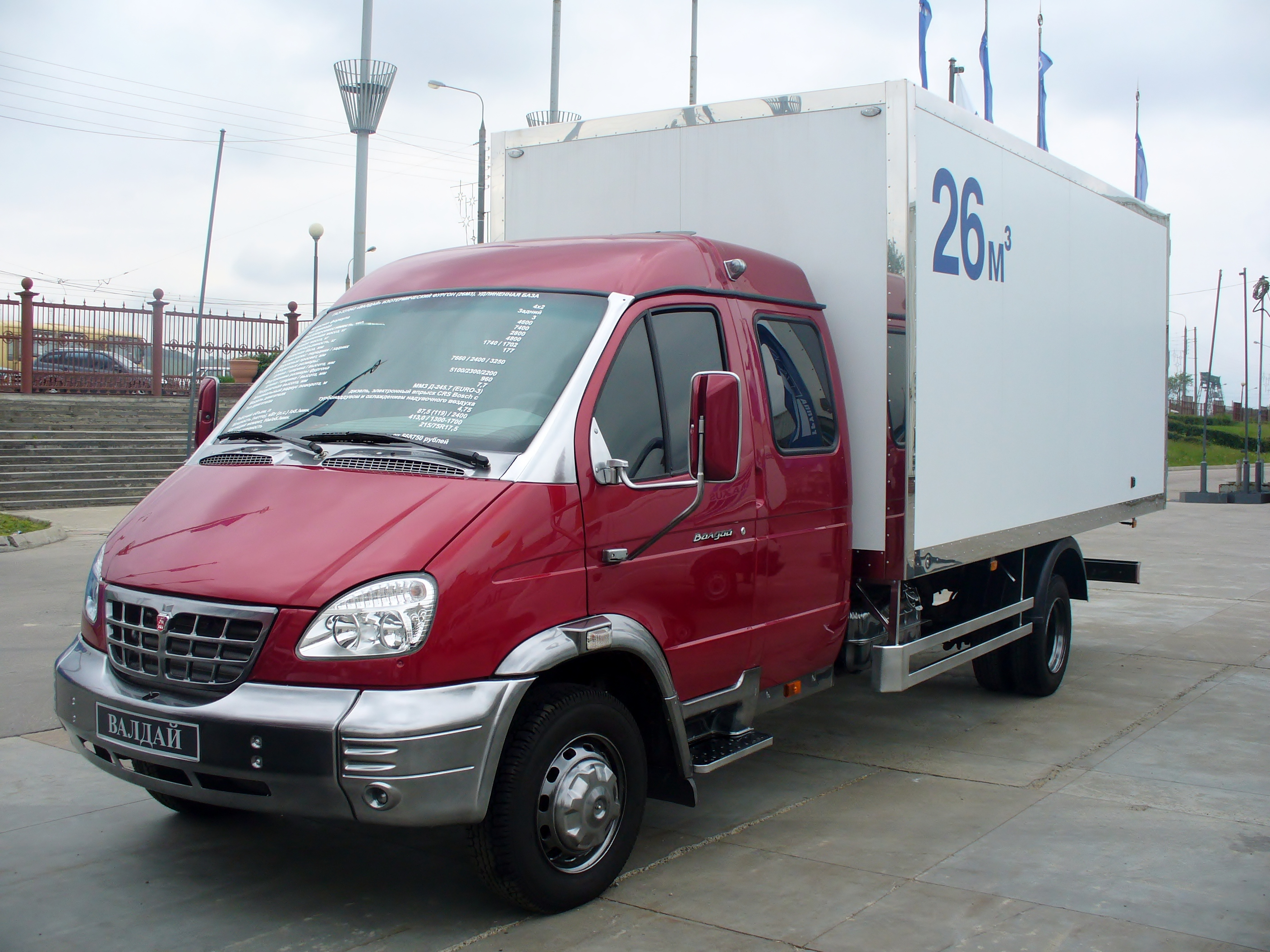
Showpiece GAZ Valdai double cabin (different chrome finish)

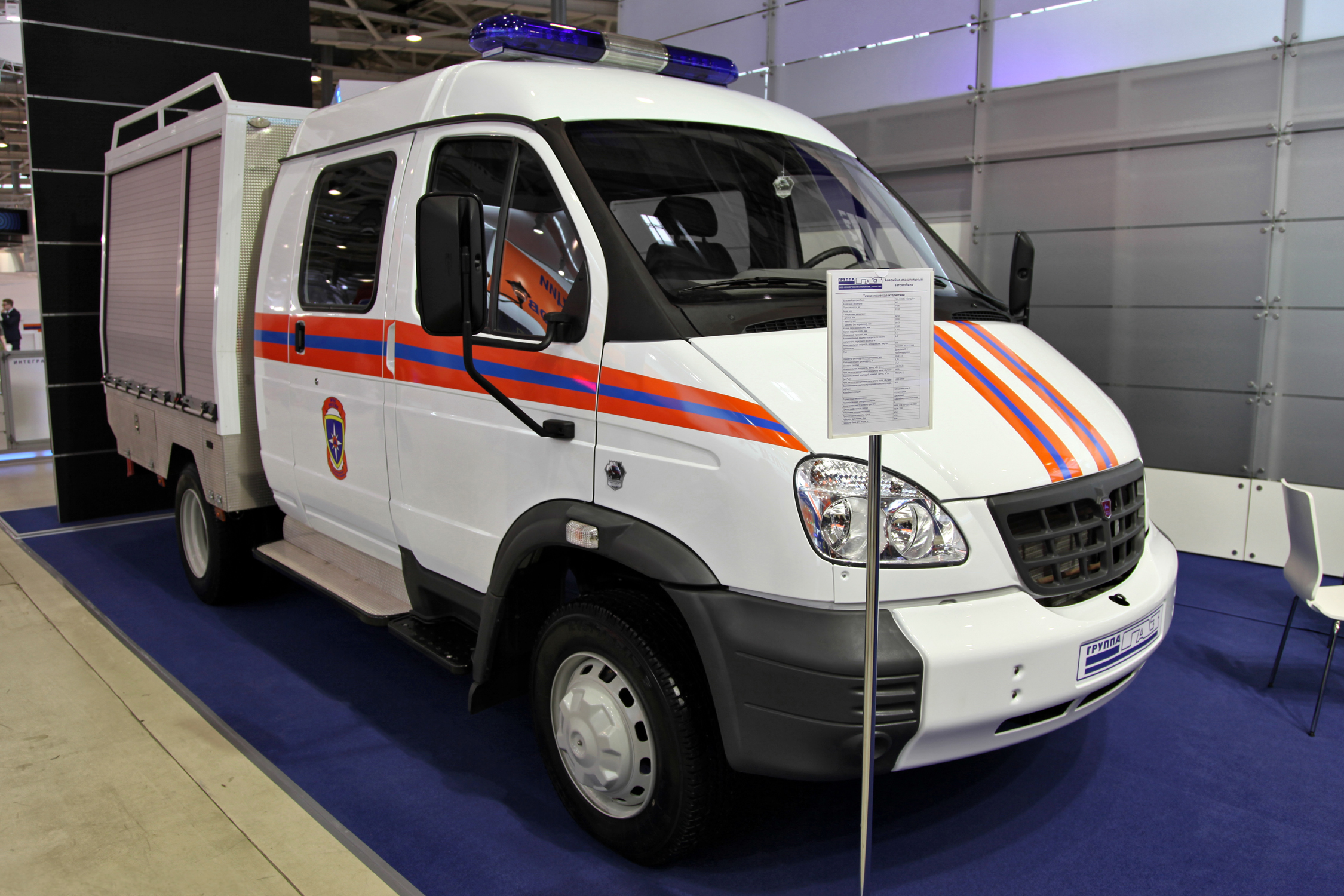
EMERCOM GAZ Valdai three door extended cab

| Version | Description |
|---|---|
| GAZ-3310 | basic version with turbodiesel GAZ-562 (3.13 liter, 150 hp, 420 N • m), not commercially produced |
| GAZ-33101 | long base and GAZ-562 turbodiesel, not commercially produced |
| GAZ-33104 | turbodiesel MMZ D-245.7E3 (Euro-3), up to 2008 D-245.7E2 (Euro-2) |
| GAZ-331041 | long base and turbodiesel MMZ D-245.7E3 (Euro-3), up to 2008 D-245.7E2 (Euro-2) |
| GAZ-331042 | long base and turbodiesel MMZ D-245.7E3 (Euro-3), up to 2008 - D-245.7E2 (Euro-2) |
| GAZ-331043 | long base, double-cab and turbodiesel MMP-245.7E3 (Euro-3), up to 2008 - D-245.7E2 (Euro-2) |
| GAZ-33106 | turbo diesel Cummins ISF (3,76 L, 152 hp maximum power, MKM = 491 Nm, Euro-3). Serially from November 2010, the previously listed export version was the Cummins 3.9 turbo diesel 140 CIV (3.9 L, 141 hp, 446 N • m, Euro-4) |
| GAZ-331061 | long base turbo diesel Cummins ISF, previously 3.9 140 CIV |
| GAZ-331063 | long base, double-cab and turbo diesel Cummins ISF, previously 3.9 140 CIV |
| GAZ-33104V | tractor (manufactured by Chaika-Service) designed to work with flatbed semi-trailers |
| GAZ-43483 | experimental version with reinforced suspension chassis and a GVW of 8.5 tonnes, as well as a double-cabin |
| SAZ-2505 | rear-way tipper lorry on chassis GAZ-33104, body capacity 3.78m³, 3 tons capacity |
| SAZ-2505-10 | three-way tipper lorry based on GAZ-33104, volume of body 5m³, Capacity 3.18 m |
| SAZ-3414 | tractor designed to work with the flatbed semi-SAZ-9414 (made to order) |

=== Specifications (end of 2010) ===
- The cabin seats three persons or six with double cabin version.

=== GAZ-33104 ===
- Engine - MMZ D-245.7E-3
- Engine type - inline 4-cylinder, 4-stroke diesel engine with liquid-cooled, turbocharged and intercooler, direct fuel injection.
- Displacement, 4.75 litres
- Compression ratio - 15:1
- Rated output kW - 119 hp @ 2400rpm
- Maximum torque - 420Nm @ 1400rpm
- Dressed weight - 3545 kg
- Gross weight - 7400 kg
- Load capacity - 4 tons
- Maximum speed - 95 km/h
- Acceleration time to 80 km/h - 45s
- Average fuel consumption, l/100 km
  - at a speed of 60 km/h - 13
  - at a speed of 80 km/h - 18

=== GAZ-33106 ===
- Engine - Cummins ISF
- Engine Type - inline 4-cylinder, 4-stroke diesel engine, liquid-cooled, turbocharged and intercooled, direct fuel injection.
- Displacement, 3.76 litres
- Rated output kW 112 hp @ 2600rpm
- Maximum torque - 491 hp @ 1200-1900rpm
- Dressed weight - 3350 kg
- Gross weight - 7400 kg
- Maximum speed - 105 km/h
- Acceleration time to 80 km/h - 40s
- Average fuel consumption, l/100 km
  - at a speed of 60 km/h - 12
  - at a speed of 80 km/h - 15

== Valdai NEXT ==
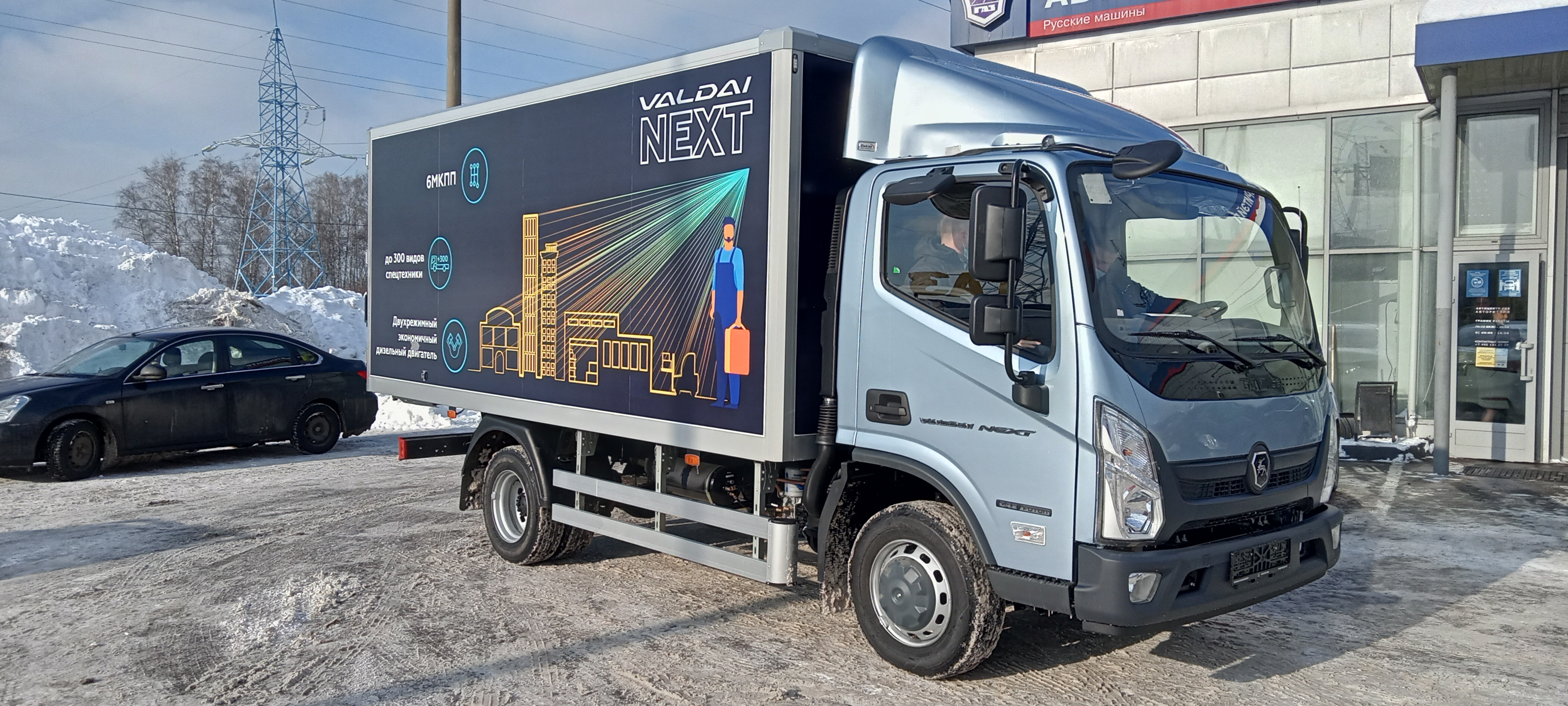
Valdai NEXT

The Valdai NEXT was launched in 2020. The chassis and axles were partially taken from the first generation, however, the cabin and interior are taken from the Chinese model Foton Ollin.

=== Specifications ===
- Engine — Cummins ISF
- Engine type — in-line, 4-cylinder, 4-stroke diesel engine with liquid cooling, turbocharging and intercooler, with direct fuel injection.
- Displacement, l — 2.8
- Compression ratio — n.d.
- Nominal power kW (hp) / (rpm) - 111 (133) / 3400
- Maximum torque, N m / (rpm) - 353 / 1200-1900
- Curb weight, kg - 3350
- Gross weight, kg - 6700
- Maximum speed, km / h - 110
- Acceleration time to 80 km / h, seconds - 40
- Average fuel consumption, l / 100 km (according to GOST 20306-90)
  - at a speed of 60 km / h - 12
  - at a speed of 80 km / h - 15
