= GAZon NEXT =

Russian medium duty truck

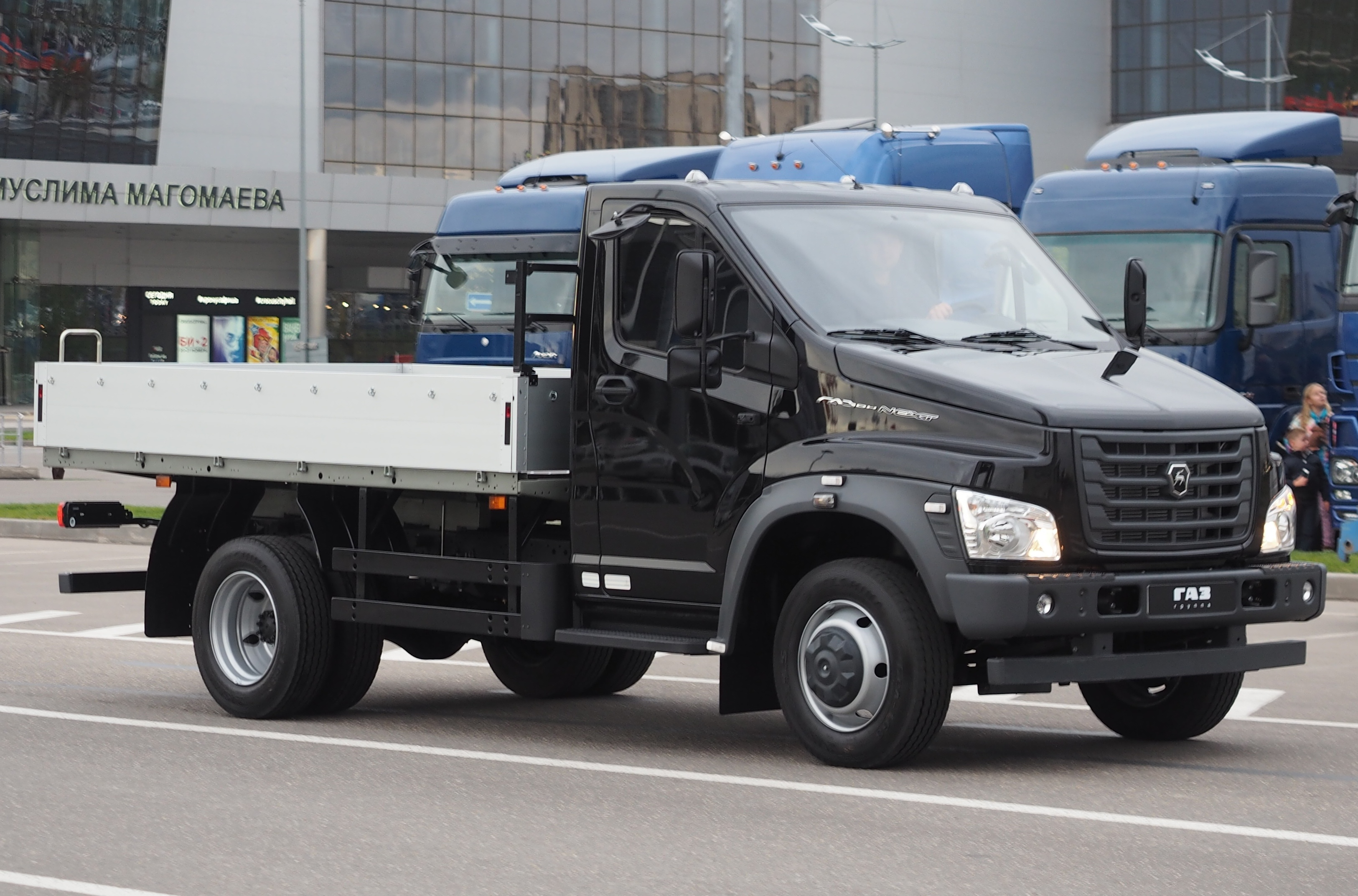

Overview
- Manufacturer: GAZ (Gorky Automobile Plant)
- Production: 2014–present
- Assembly: Russia: Nizhny Novgorod

Body and chassis
- Class: Medium truck
- Body style: Flatbed truck
- Layout: FR layout

Dimensions
- Wheelbase: 3,770 mm (148 in)
- Length: 6,450 mm (254 in)
- Width: 2,750 mm (108 in)
- Height: 2,335–2,400 mm (92–94 in)

Chronology
- Predecessor: GAZ-3307

The GAZon NEXT is a truck produced by the Russian vehicle manufacturer GAZ. The vehicle has been in production since 2014 and is the successor to the GAZ-3307. Under the name Sadko NEXT comes a four-wheel drive variant of the vehicle; accordingly, this is the successor to the GAZ-3308.

== Overview ==
The GAZon NEXT is a light two-axle truck with rear-axle drive and 8.7 tonnes gross vehicle weight. It is offered with different body variants. Flatbed models are also delivered, as well as refrigerated vehicles or special vehicles for authorities or for snow removal. Likewise, garbage trucks are also built. The built-in diesel engine is a Russian make of YaMZ with about 110 kW (150 hp) of power and 4.43 liter cubic capacity.

The serial production of the GAZon NEXT commenced in Nizhny Novgorod on 19 September 2014 and the investment cost for the new production line amounted to more than 2.3 billion rubles. It is unclear in this context whether the production of the predecessor GAZ-3307 was discontinued at the same time, but this vehicle is no longer offered.

At the end of 2015, a basic GAZon NEXT cost about 1.4 million rubles (about €20,000 at that time).

== Variants ==
According to GAZ, the GAZon NEXT is available in over 300 model variants. The following list is limited to the most important basic variants.

- GAZ-С41R13-10 – standard model with a single cab and a short wheelbase of 3,770 mm (148 in)
- GAZ-С41R13-1010 – standard model, but with a refrigerated body, short wheelbase
- GAZ-С41R33-10 – standard model with a single cab and a long wheelbase of 4,515 mm (177.8 in)
- GAZ-С41R33-10 – Version designated GAZon NEXT City. The entire vehicle is lower and has a deeper loading sill. The wheelbase is 3,770 mm (148 in).
- GAZ-С41R33-10 – GAZon NEXT City with a long wheelbase of 4,515 mm (177.8 in)
- GAZ-С42R33-10 – standard model with a long wheelbase and a crew cab
- GAZ-С41R33-1010 – standard model with a tarpaulin, long wheelbase
