= Volga Siber =

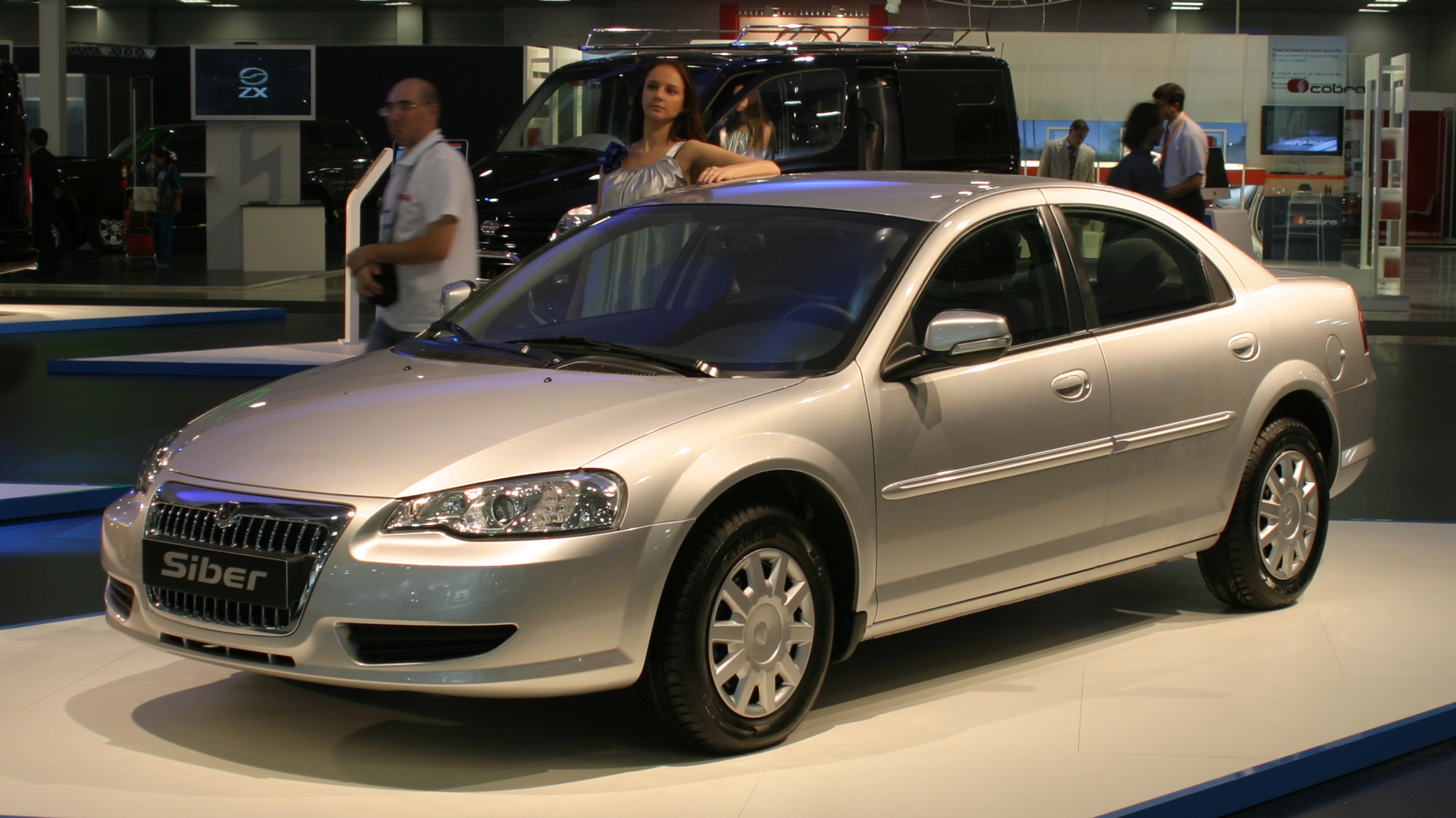

Overview
- Manufacturer: GAZ
- Production: 2008–2010
- Assembly: Russia: Nizhny Novgorod (Final assembly); Mexico: Complejo Industrial Ramos Arizpe (Engines and electronics)
- Designer: UltraMotive

Body and chassis
- Class: Mid-size
- Body style: 4-door saloon
- Layout: FF layout
- Platform: Chrysler JR41 platform
- Related: Chrysler Sebring; Dodge Stratus

Powertrain
- Engine: 2.0 L ECC I4; 2.4 L EDZ I4
- Transmission: 5-speed manual; 4-speed 41TE automatic

Dimensions
- Wheelbase: 2,766.1 mm (108.9 in)
- Length: 4,841.2 mm (190.6 in)
- Width: 1,808.5 mm (71.2 in)
- Height: 1,498.6 mm (59 in)

Chronology
- Predecessor: GAZ-31105; GAZ-3111; Chrysler Sebring (Russian version)
- Successor: Volga С40 (2024, cancelled); Volga C50 (2026)

The Volga Siber is a four-door sedan manufactured by the Russian firm GAZ, introduced at the 2007 Moscow International Automobile Salon and marketed in a single generation for model years 2008 to 2010.

Manufactured under license from Chrysler, the Siber used the superseded platform and tooling from the second generation Chrysler Sebring/Dodge Stratus with slight design modifications executed by the British studio UltraMotive to its grille and headlights. Other modifications were limited to a stiffer suspension and higher ground clearance.

The Siber was introduced at the start of the 2008 financial crisis, and though annual production of 40,000 vehicles had been planned, sales were not as expected and 9,000 had been manufactured by the time the Siber was discontinued after model year 2010.

== Trim levels ==
Two trim levels were available: Comfort (with 2.0 or 2.4 litre engines), and Lux (2.4 L engine only).

The base level had the 2.0 litre, 141 hp engine, air conditioning, driver and passenger airbags, ABS, a traction control system, halogen headlamps, power steering, adjustable steering column, electrically adjustable driver's side seating, a six-speaker amplified audio system, heated folding side mirrors, self-dimming interior rear-view mirror, and a single-use spare tire.

The more expensive "Lux" trim level had the more powerful 2.4 L, 143 hp engine, a leather interior, an anti-theft system, and front fog lamps.

== Production ==
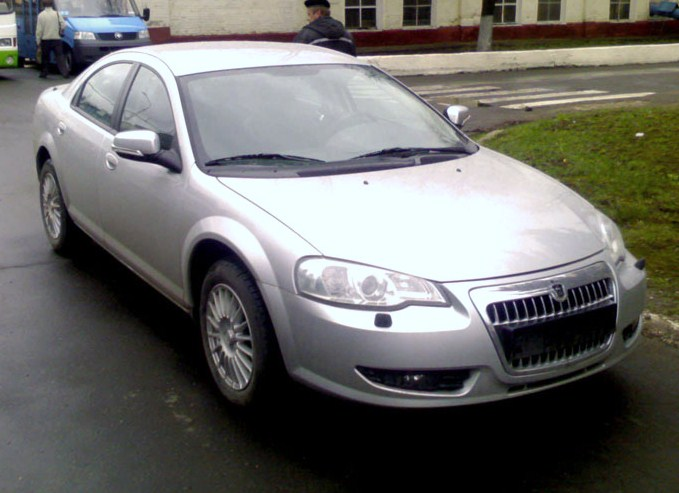
ГАЗ-Siber on the grounds of the factory LiAZ

Production of the GAZ Siber began with a pilot batch on 28 March 2008, with a steady production level reached by 25 July 2008. Russian President Vladimir Putin visited the factory on the eve of volume production, along with dignitaries from the state of Michigan and the Michigan Economic Development Corporation.

20,000 Sibers were planned for production in 2008, with 40,000 planned for 2009. Eventual yearly production was desired to reach the plant capacity of 100,000 vehicles per year. On 29 August 2008, GAZ began fleet sales of the Siber, to government employees and businesses including Russian bank Sberbank.

The assembly tooling was dismantled in Detroit and shipped to Russia, where it was reassembled. The transplanted GAZ plant assembly line approximated the layout of the former Chrysler plant, with assembly workers having completed a comprehensive professional training program abroad. Engineers from Magna International assisted in transfer of the assembly line and employee training. The first vehicle type to be manufactured in the new plant was the Siber.

At first, mostly imported parts were used in vehicle assembly; domestic components were used only when their quality was at least as good as their imported counterparts. Engines were purchased from Chrysler. Plans were to bring local parts production levels to 50%. Head- and tail-lamps, bumpers and some panel components were produced locally at the start of production. All other parts were imported; the engine and electronics were produced at the Complejo Industrial Ramos Arizpe industrial centre in Saltillo, Mexico, and other parts in the USA.

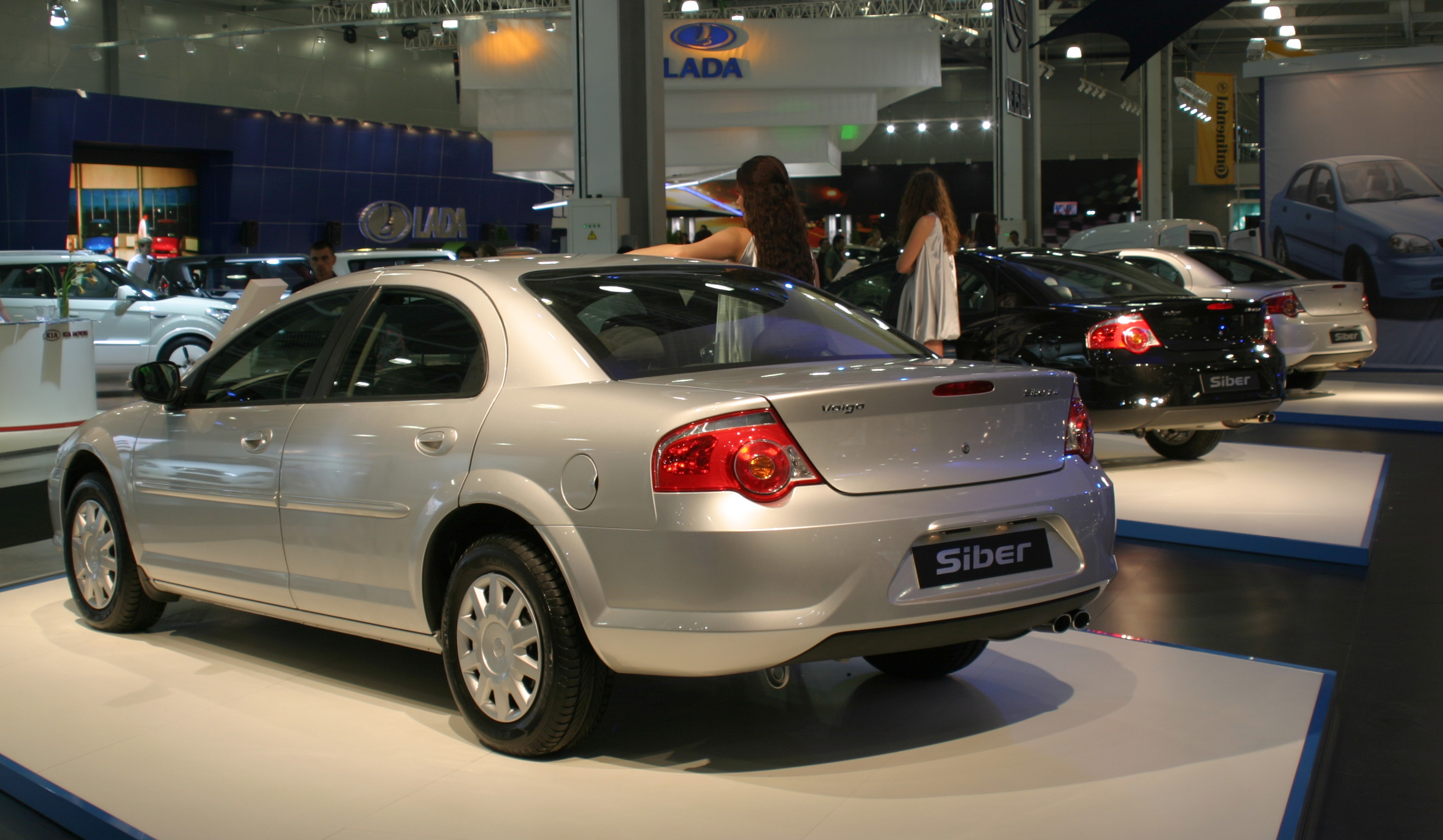
Rear view

Due to the economic crisis in 2008 and 2009, demand for Siber fell and production ended in November 2010. In total, about 9,000 cars were produced during the 2008–2010 production run.

The production of the older GAZ-31105 ended in summer 2010. In 2010, the passenger car assemblies of the GAZ factory were purchased by Volkswagen Group Rus, who started producing the Skoda Octavia in the plant. Other models like the Škoda Yeti and Volkswagen Jetta also started getting produced.

== Safety ==
The car scored 7.2 points out of 16 in a frontal crash test conducted by the Russian ARCAP safety assessment program in 2008, and was awarded two stars out of four.
