= GAZ-3307 =

Russian motor vehicle

GAZ-3307/GAZ-3309
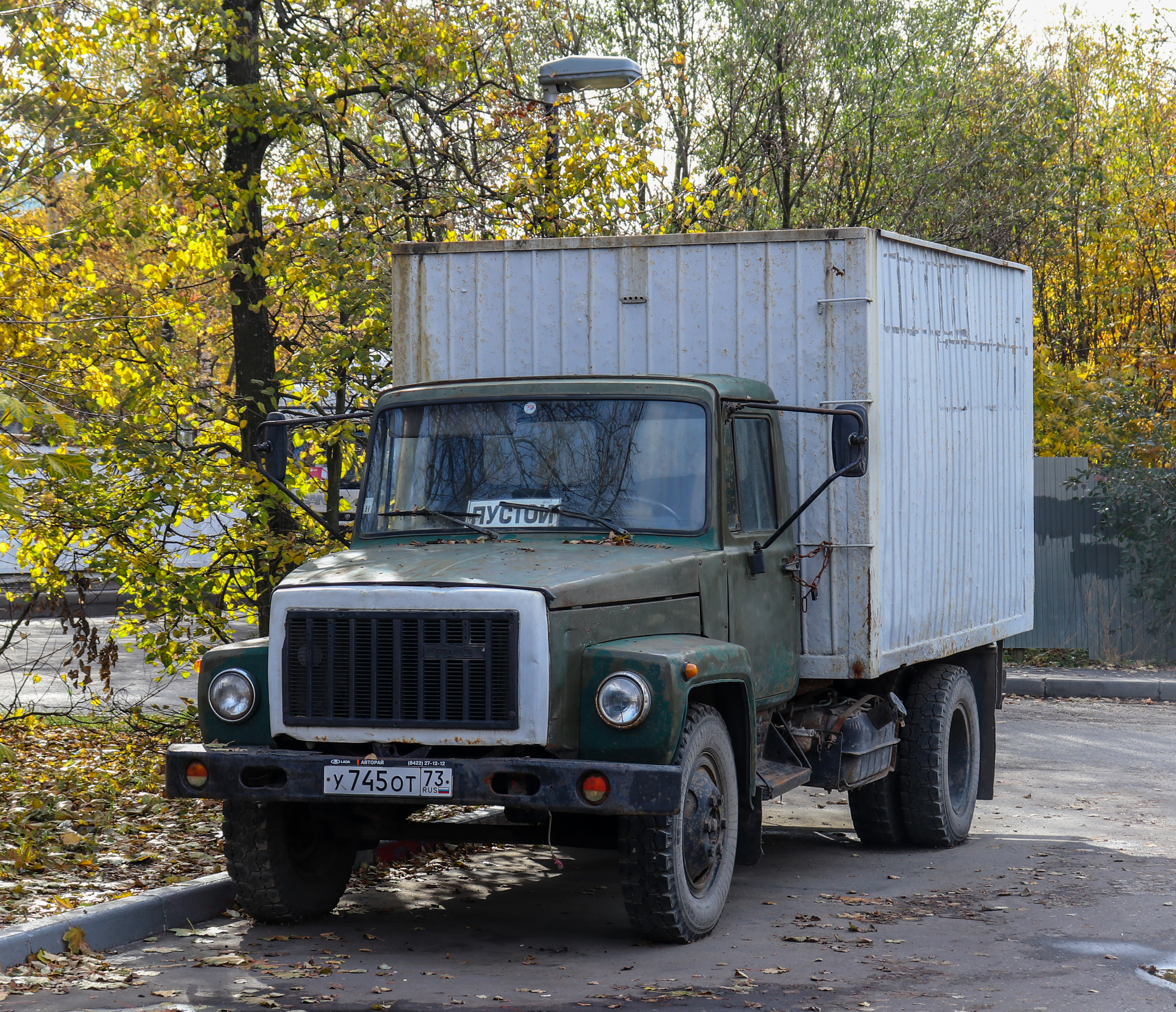
- GAZ-3307 in Moscow

Overview
- Manufacturer: Gorky Automobile Plant
- Also called: GAZon
- Production: 1989–2020
- Assembly: Russia: Nizhny Novgorod; Belarus: Kolyadichi (BelAvtoGAZ: 2012–2020)

Body and chassis
- Class: Medium truck
- Body style: Flatbed truck
- Layout: FR layout

Powertrain
- Engine: Petrol: 4.25 L ZMZ-511 V8; 4.67 L ZMZ-5231 V8; Diesel: 3.8 L Cummins ISF turbo I4; 4.15 L ZMZ-5441 air-cooled turbo I4; 4.43 L YaMZ-5342 turbo I4; 4.75 L MMZ D-245.7 turbo I4; 3.8 L Hino W04CT turbo I4
- Transmission: 5-speed manual

Dimensions
- Wheelbase: 148.43 in (3,770 mm)
- Length: 257.9 in (6,551 mm)
- Width: 93.701 in (2,380 mm)
- Height: 92.52 in (2,350 mm)

Chronology
- Predecessor: GAZ-53
- Successor: GAZon NEXT

The GAZ-3307 and GAZ-3309 (nicknamed GAZon) are Russian trucks produced by the Gorky Automobile Plant. The GAZ-3307 was announced in late 1989, followed by GAZ-3309 in late 1994. Under the GAZ-3309 designation, variants were offered with an extended wheelbase and a modified engine. The GAZ-3308 is the all-wheel-drive version that has also been used for military purposes. More than 1.5 million GAZ-3307s were built, and in January 2020, production ceased after 31 years. Since 2014, a successor has been produced in the form of the GAZon NEXT.

== History and development ==
When the GAZ-3307 was designed in the early 1980s, it employed common assembly techniques and parts found in models of the time. Its chassis and engine were derived from the GAZ-53-12), resulting in lower costs and easier maintenance.

The vehicle was fitted with a more spacious and modern cab, equipped with an efficient ventilation and heating system. The cab design was much more modern and was inspired by trucks built by Magirus-Deutz. Testing of the GAZ-3307 model was finished in December 1986.

Unlike their predecessors, these trucks were equipped with power steering. Serial production of the 4.5-ton GAZ-3307, powered by the ZMZ-511 engine (an updated version of the ZMZ-53) began in late 1989.

Around 2006, the GAZ-3307, GAZ-3309, and GAZ-3308 received updated petrol and diesel engines that complied with Euro 2 emissions standards, followed by further engine update in 2008 to ensure Euro 3 compliance. Mass production of the GAZ-3307 and -3308 models with ZMZ engines was discontinued in 2009, although restricted production continued for government agencies.

In 2010–2012, the GAZ-3309 was fitted with a MMZ D-245.7 E-3 diesel engine, and the GAZ-33081 Sadko and GAZ-33086 Countryman variants were fitted with the MMZ D-245.7 E-2 diesel engine. All vehicles produced after 2013 received the MMZ D-245.7 E-4 engine.

Since 2012, the GAZ-33096 has been produced with a diesel engine, which was certified under Euro 4 emissions standards in 2013. In February 2013, the GAZ-33098 received a new YaMZ-5342.10 engine, and a new model, the GAZ-33088, was introduced. The successor to the GAZ-3307 is the GAZon NEXT, which was introduced in 2014 and has been in series production since then. The GAZ-3307 was no longer included in the manufacturer's vehicle range from about 2016, but was still available on order. The GAZ-3309, on the other hand, was offered unchanged.

In January 2020, production of both models was discontinued in favor of the respective successors. Over the course of the 31-year production period, numerous additional variants or models were produced, which were identified by numbers appended to the basic designation GAZ-3307. In the case of special bodies, there was also a complete deviation from the typing.

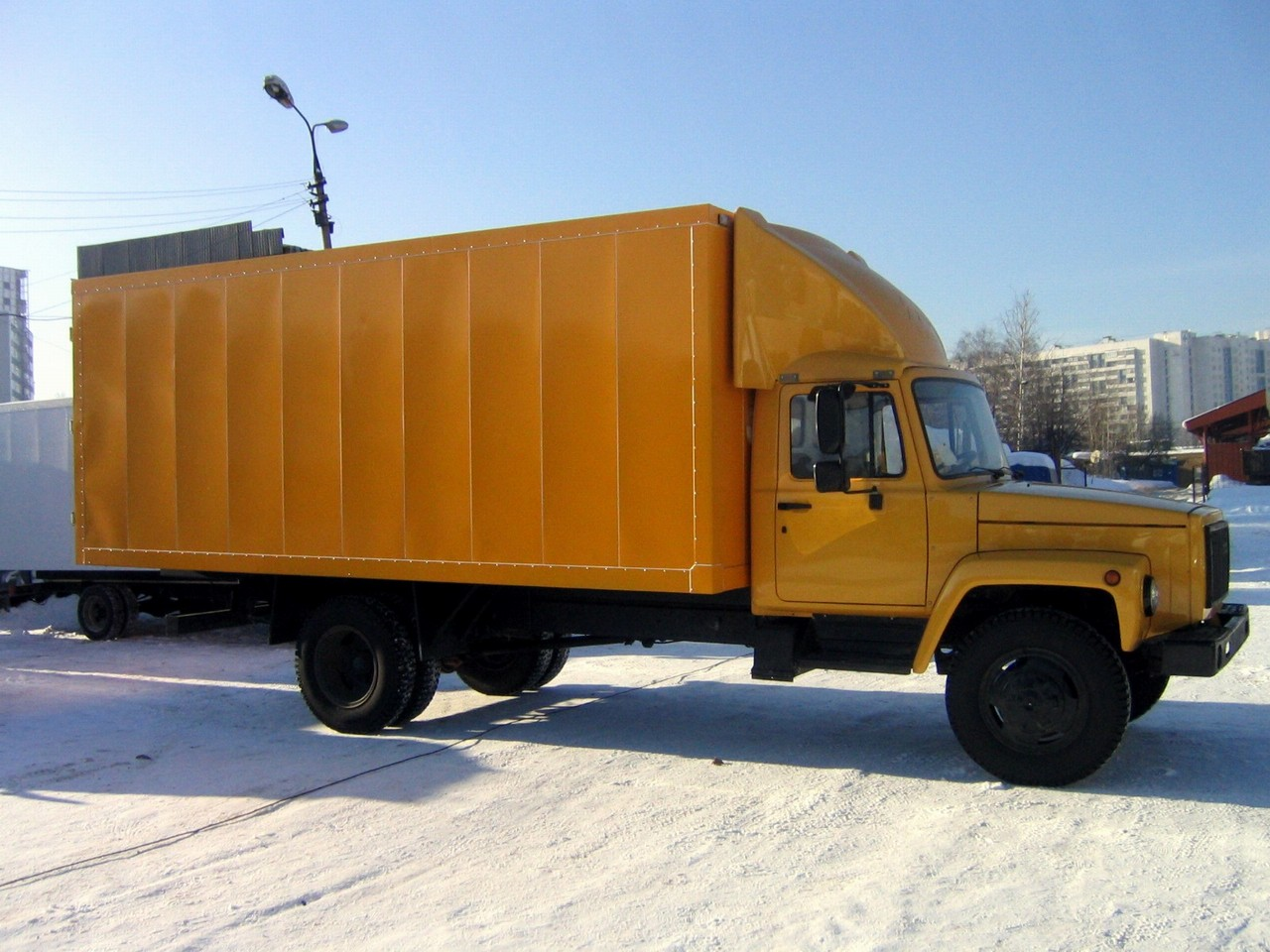
Van-based chassis GAZ-33091 with a long base

== Models ==
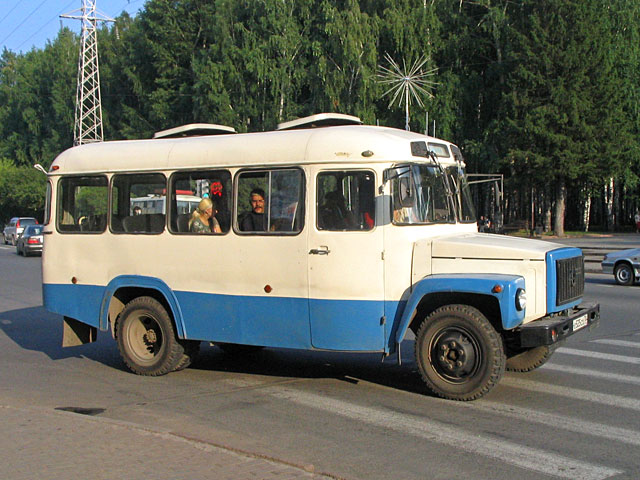
KAvZ-3976 Combination bus

Multiple variants of the GAZ-3307 and -3309 were released:

- GAZ-33070: chassis and flatbed truck with the ZMZ-511/-513/-5233 engine;
- GAZ-33072: chassis with the ZMZ-511/-513/-5233 engine under tipper production SAZ;
- GAZ-33073: cargo taxi (box with awning, folding benches along the sides, the door to the back board and folding stairs);
- GAZ-33074: extended chassis with the ZMZ-513/-5234 engine under mounting KAvZ-3976 (discontinued in late 2007);
- GAZ-33075: chassis and flatbed truck with the ZMZ-513 bi-fuel engine for liquefied petroleum gas (LPG) and petrol;
- GAZ-33076: chassis and flatbed truck with the ZMZ-513 bi-fuel engine for compressed natural gas (CNG) and petrol;
- GAZ-33078: chassis and flatbed truck with the Hino W04CT diesel engine;
- GAZ-33090: chassis and flatbed with the MMZ D-245.7E2 turbo-diesel engine;
- GAZ-33091: extended by 1.4 m and a flatbed truck chassis with the MMZ D-245.7E2;
- GAZ-33092: chassis with double cab for 7 persons and MMZ D-245.7E2 turbo-diesel engine (used in fire engines);
- GAZ-33094: extended chassis with the MMZ D-245.7E2 turbo-diesel engine under mounting KAvZ-397650;
- SAZ-3507-01: three-way tipper chassis version of the GAZ-33072, volume of body 5 m^{3} (10 m^{3} with extended sides), load capacity 4.13 m (4.33 m);
- SAZ-35071: three-way tipper chassis version of the GAZ-3309, volume of body 5 m^{3} (10 m^{3} with extended sides), load capacity 3.93 m (4.13 m);
- SAZ-35072: tipper trucks with the chassis of the GAZ-33072, body capacity 4.5 m^{3}, Capacity 4.25 m;
- SAZ-35072-10: three-way tipper chassis version of the GAZ-3309, volume of body 4.5 m^{3}, load capacity of 4.1 tons;
- GAZ-33098: flatbed truck chassis with the YaMZ-5344 turbo-diesel engine;
- GAZ-33096: flatbed truck with the Cummins ISF 3.8L diesel engine.
