= ZMZ-24 =

ZMZ-24 Engine
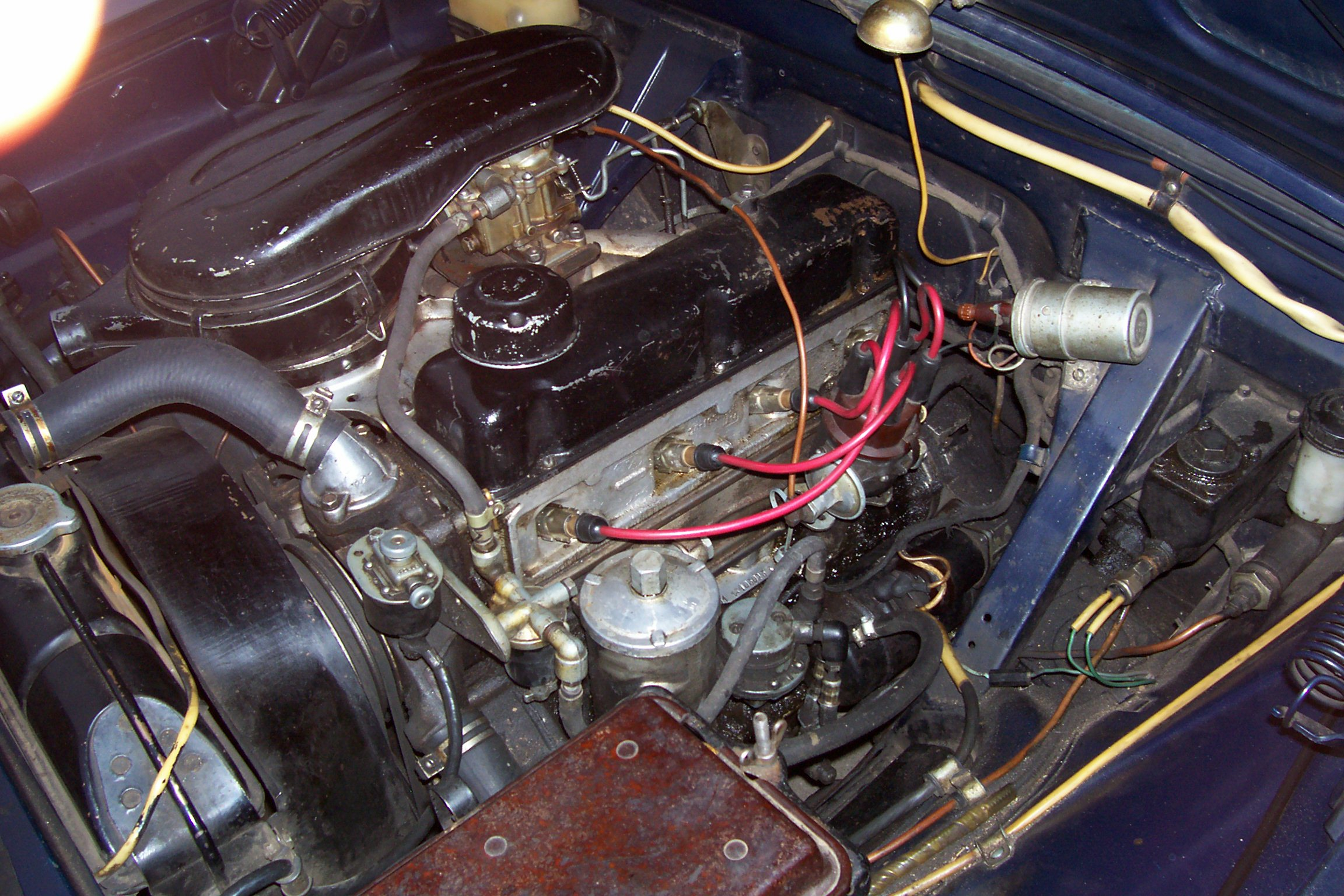
- Gaz-24 Volga engine in a GAZ-24

Overview
- Manufacturer: Zavolzhye Engine Factory
- Production: 1968-1987

Layout
- Configuration: Straight-4
- Displacement: 2.5 L; 152.6 cu in (2,500 cc)
- Cylinder bore: 86 mm (3.39 in); 88 mm (3.46 in)
- Piston stroke: 77 mm (3.03 in); 82 mm (3.23 in); 86 mm (3.39 in); 97 mm (3.82 in)
- Cylinder block material: Aluminum
- Cylinder head material: Aluminum
- Valvetrain: 8-valve overhead valve (OHV)
- Compression ratio: 10.0:1, 10.2:1, 10.5:1

Combustion
- Turbocharger: no turbocharger
- Fuel system: 2bbl Carburetor
- Fuel type: Gasoline
- Oil system: Wet sump
- Cooling system: Water-cooled

Output
- Power output: 70–95 hp (52–71 kW)
- Torque output: 186 lb⋅ft (252 N⋅m)

The ZMZ-24 was an aluminium-block overhead valve (OHV) inline four design, an evolution of the ZMZ-21A, displacing 2,445 cc (149.2 cu in), and in its initial appearance, produced with chain-driven camshaft and compression ratio of 6.6:1; it produced 70 hp (52 kW; 71 PS) at 4,000 rpm and 123 lb⋅ft (167 N⋅m) at 2,200 rpm. It was also produced as the UMZ 4178.10.

== Description ==
The ZMZ-24 is essentially a modified version of the previous ZMZ-21 engine which was designed in the 1950s and has the same displacement. This engine was designed for use in the GAZ-56 truck which was developed in 1952-1962 but did not enter mass-production. It later went on to be used in the 1956 GAZ-21 Volga and various vans and jeeps, such as the RAF-977 and UAZ-469. Following further modifications in the 1960s, the engine was renamed ZMZ-21A and this is the design that the ZMZ-24 was later derived from.

It "quickly became the mainstay of the Soviet engine industry", and would be used in a variety of vehicles.

The improved ZMZ-24D, found in the GAZ-24, ran on 92 RON gasoline (while the ZMZ-24-01 could use commonly available 76 octane, and the ZMZ-24-07 could use liquid propane). The cylinder block was die cast, instead of the slower coquille for the 21A. The engine featured a twin-choke carburettor, with a higher compression ratio, producing 95 hp (71 kW; 96 PS) at 4500 rpm and an even more impressive 186 N⋅m (137 ft⋅lbf) of torque at 2200–2400 RPM.

Most Volgas came with that engine and it was available in two versions – the 24D and the 2401 – that differed only in compression ratio (D does not stand for “Diesel”; the 24D should not to be confused with diesel engines available in the Volga on some foreign markets). The low-compression 2401 engine, despite slightly lower horsepower (85 vs. 95 hp) and torque ratings, was by far the most popular of the two, as it could run on lower grade fuel which was both cheaper and more available in remote areas of the country; most taxicabs were equipped with this engine as well. It also saw use in the RAF-2203, UAZ-469 and the ErAZ van.

The ZMZ-24 also served as the basis for the “torch-ignition” 4022.10 (1981–1994; 3 valves per cylinder, lean burn, stratified charge) which was used in the GAZ-3102 Volga.

By 1985, the ZMZ-24 had been renamed the ZMZ-402.10, with a lower-compression 4021.10 version, which remained in limited production until 2006.

It also served as the basis for the sixteen-valve 131 hp (98 kW; 133 PS) 2,287 cc (139.6 cu in) ZMZ-4062.10 (seen in some Volgas after 1996), the 145 hp (108 kW; 147 PS) 2,463 cc (150.3 cu in) ZMZ-40552.10 (used in GAZ's commercial vehicles), the 2,690 cc (164 cu in) ZMZ-409.10 of the UAZ Patriot, and the ZMZ-5143 diesel all derive from the ZMZ-24.

== Sources ==
- Thompson, Andy. Cars of the Soviet Union. Somerset, UK: Haynes Publishing, 2008.
