= GAZ-24 =

Volga GAZ-24
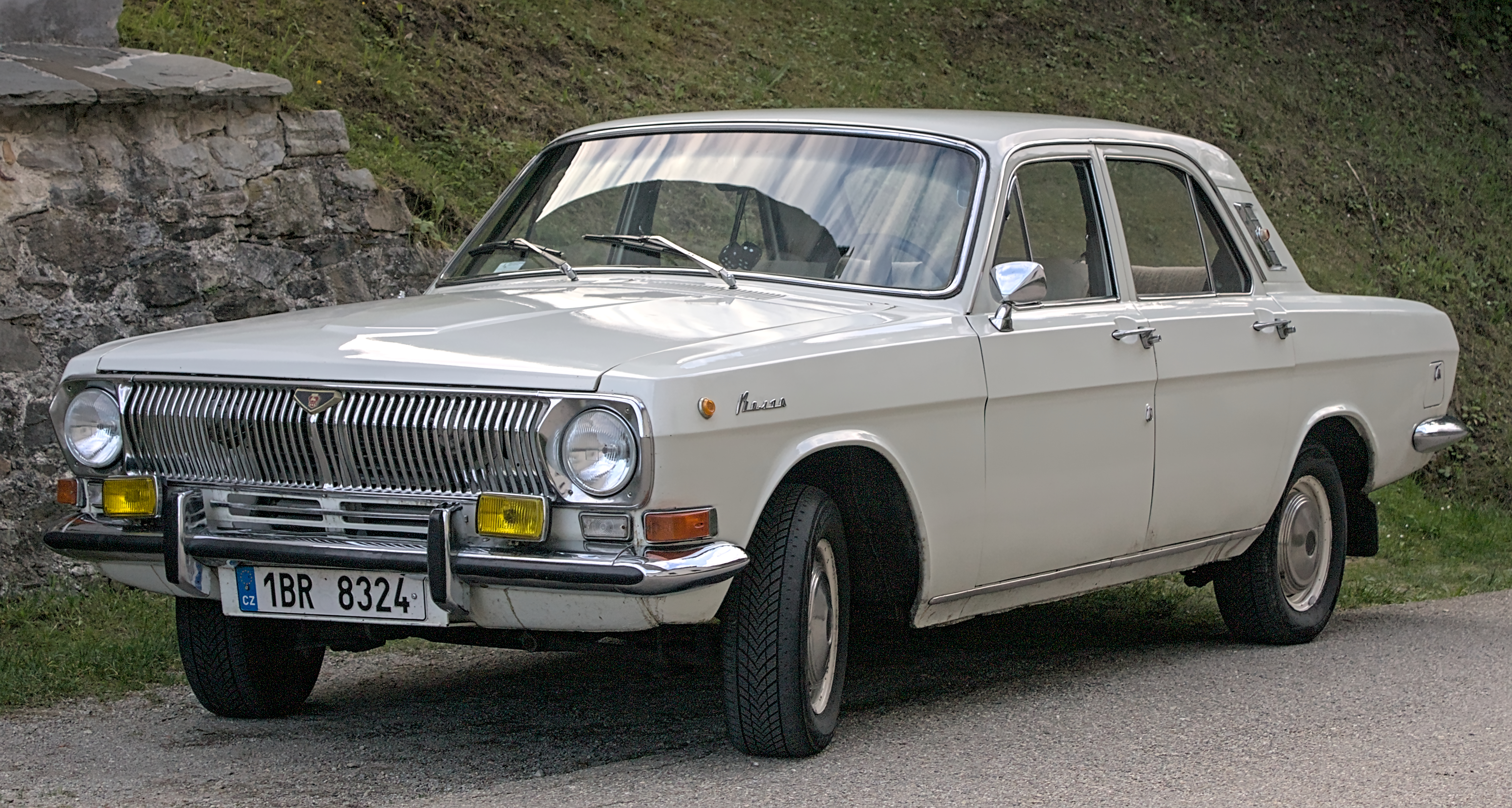

Overview
- Manufacturer: GAZ
- Also called: Scaldia-Volga M24/M24D
- Production: GAZ-24-01: 1970–1986; GAZ-24-02: 1972–1986 (5-door station wagon); GAZ-24-10: 1986–1992; GAZ-24-12: 1987–1992
- Assembly: Soviet Union: Gorky, RSFSR; Belgium: Antwerp (Scaldia-Volga S.A.)
- Designer: Leonid Tsikolenko, Nikolay Kireev

Body and chassis
- Class: Executive car
- Layout: Front-engine, rear-wheel drive

Chronology
- Predecessor: GAZ-21 Volga
- Successor: GAZ-3102 Volga

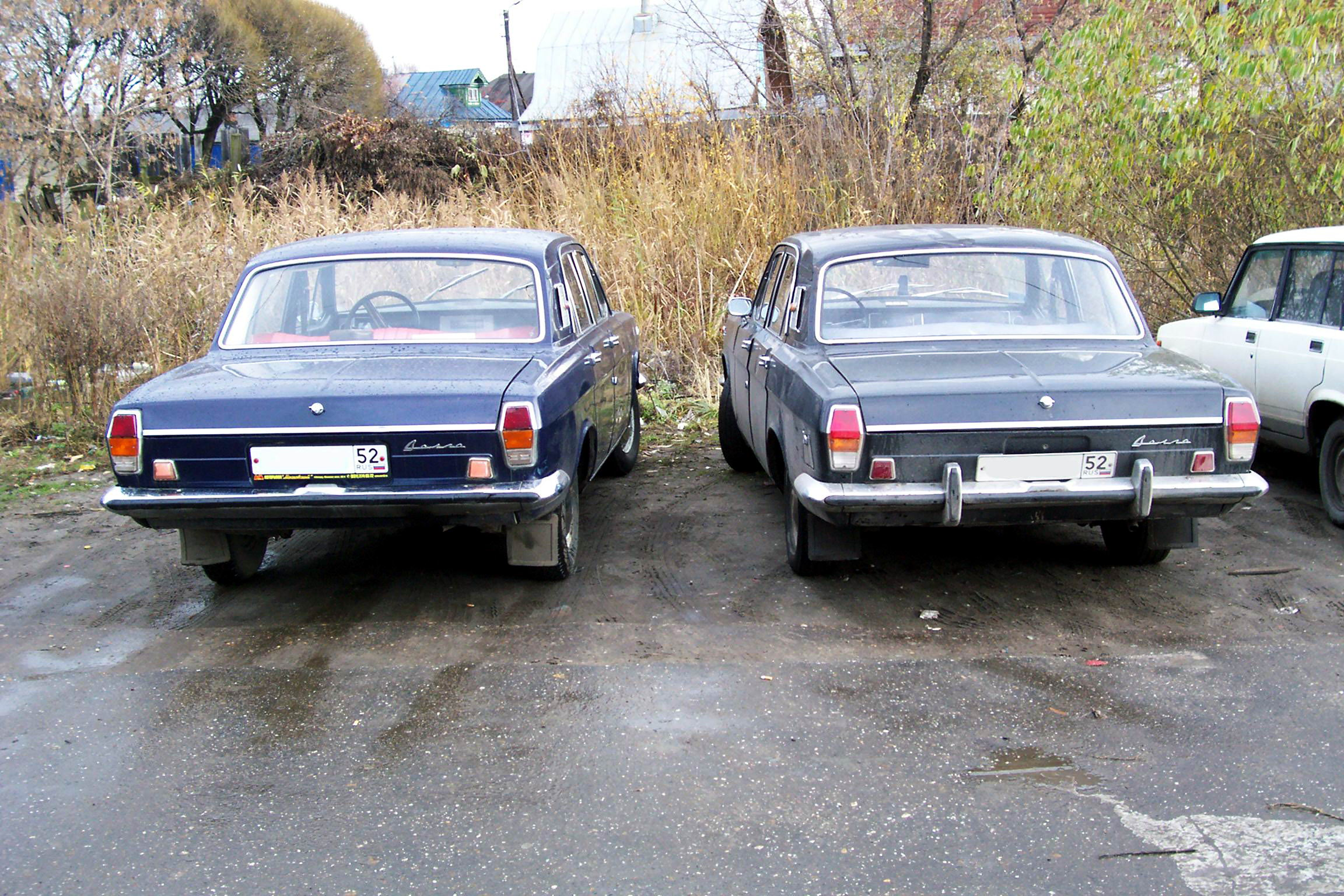
1974 and 1978 Volgas - representing two generations of the GAZ-24 Volga

The GAZ-24 "Volga" is a car manufactured by the Gorky Automobile Plant (Gorkovsky Avtomobilny Zavod, GAZ) from July 1970 to 1986 as a generation of its Volga nameplate. A largely redesigned version (practically, a new car in a modified old body) – GAZ-24-10 – was produced from April 1986 to summer 1992. The Belgian-assembled rebadged models were sold as Scaldia-Volga M24 and M24D for the Western European market.

The lower body waist line, allowed the window area was to be increased, whilst using thinner linings in doors, roof, and other body panels notably increased interior space.

== 1967–1969 ==
M-24 prototype (photo dated 1967): Some prototypes had quadruple headlights. The first prototypes were built in 1966.

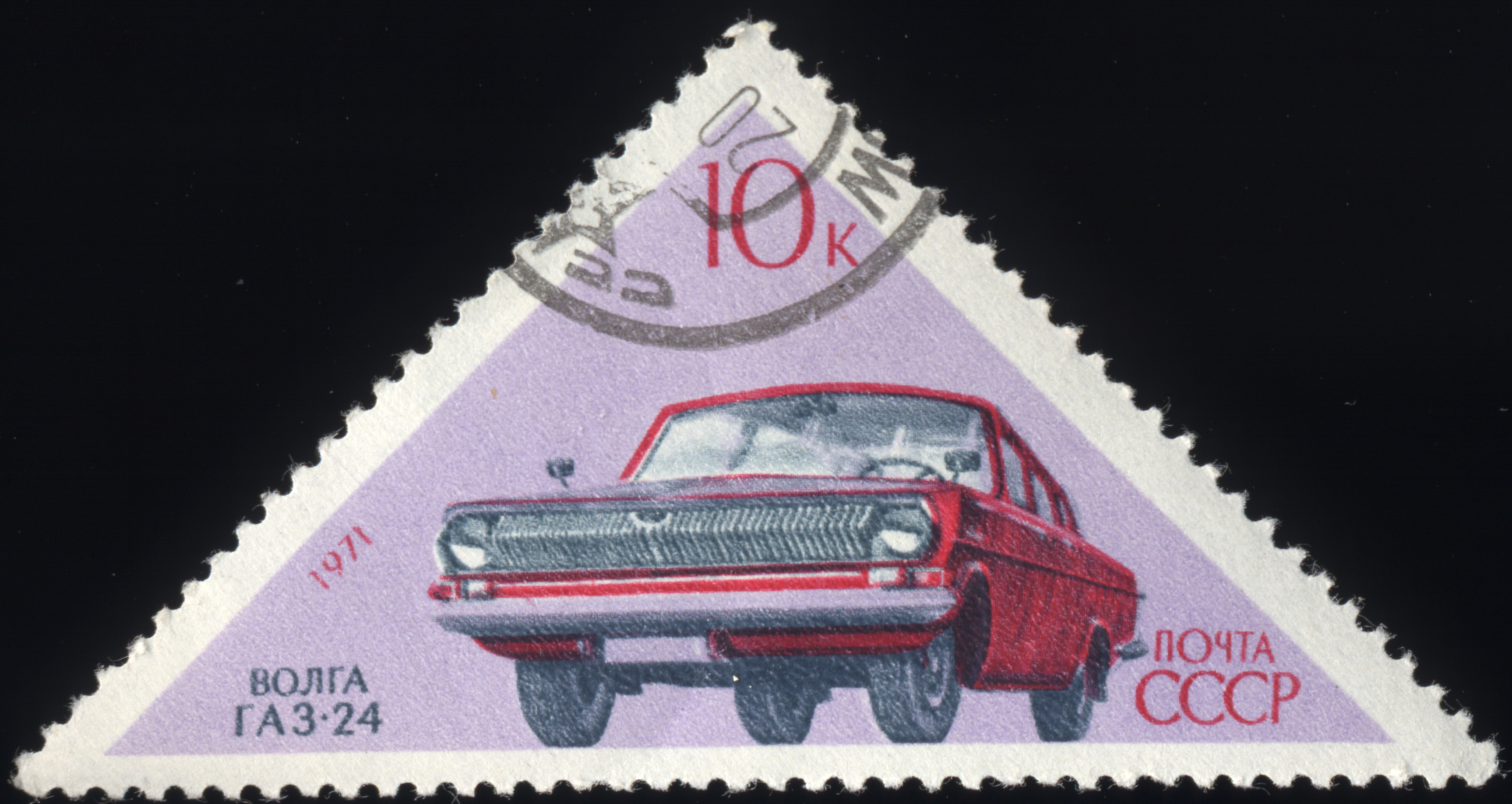
"Preserial" Volga depicted on Soviet 1971 10-kopeks postage stamp

Development of the GAZ-24 (then called M-24) was mostly finished in 1966, when 12 of the third-series prototypes had been built and their design approved. It was unveiled towards the end of 1967. Only 32 units were built in 1968, though, primarily for road tests, with another 215 units built in 1969. The 1968/1969-built Volgas are often called "preserial" because full-scale manufacturing started only in 1970 (18,486 units built). Distinctive features of the first several prototypes were two outside rearview mirrors fixed on the front fenders. Most of the preserial and all serial cars got one mirror placed on front left door.

The GAZ-24 was developed to replace the outdated Volga GAZ-21 developed in the 1950s. The new Volga had a longer wheelbase (2,800 mm (110 in)) than the GAZ-21 (2700 mm (106 in), but slightly shorter overall length (4,735 mm (186.4 in) compared to 4,810 mm (189 in)) and was substantially lower at 1,490 mm (59 in)) compared to 1,620 mm (64 in). Width remained untouched. A long wheelbase, boxier styling, bucket seats with lower bases, and a flat roof made the new Volga generously sized inside, with comfortable five- or six-passenger seating. The car was designed to last for years in severe road conditions, and its reinforced unibody construction gave the Volga extra weight compared to foreign analogues, yet power steering was not even an option, and it gained the nickname barzha (barge).

The standard engine was aluminium-block overhead-valve 2,445 cc (149.2 cu in) ZMZ-24D inline-four producing 95 metric horsepower (70 kW) with one twin-choke carburetor, an evolution of the ZMZ-21A. GAZ prototyped an automatic, a column-shift manual, and a three-speed manual with overdrive, but in the end only a four-speed manual transmission with floor-mounted shifter was offered, fully synchronized unlike its predecessor. The brakes were improved with a hydraulic vacuum servo unit as well as an independent parking brake (rather than the GAZ-21's transmission brake). Certain features were retained for their proven reliability, like the kingpin front suspension and recirculating ball steering.

The GAZ-21 trim lines ("standard" and "improved") were dropped, all GAZ-24 Volgas had similar trim. No specific options or extras were listed, but standard equipment included self-adjusting power drum brakes with front/rear split brake system, three-wave radio with power antenna, interior safety padding, central armrests (both front and rear), alternator, three-speed windshield wiper and foot-operated windshield washer, heater with defroster, rear window defogger, electric clock, and trunk and engine-compartment lights. Early cars had "ribbon" speedometers, with gauges that filled up with red, in a thermometer fashion. The interior was available in three colours – red, brown, or light gray. Interior colour selection was often in contrast to the color of the exterior. Official cars were almost always black outside and red inside. The dashboard was made of aluminium and painted in exterior colour, the upper part covered with safety padding and black vinyl.

Some features of the Volga's styling were thematically quite similar to those of the GAZ-21, such as the vertical tail lights, so-called "baleen plates" grille, and tiny fins on the rear fenders. Some of the most recognizable features of the GAZ-24 Volga sedan styling are chromed rhombic vents on the C-pillar. Among other distinctive features can be mentioned dashboard handles with "ivory" plastic inserts, two chromed "fangs" under the front bumper, a large, two-spoke steering wheel, and a large chromed parking-brake handle placed under the dashboard on the right.

== 1970–1974 ==
First generation (1968–1977)
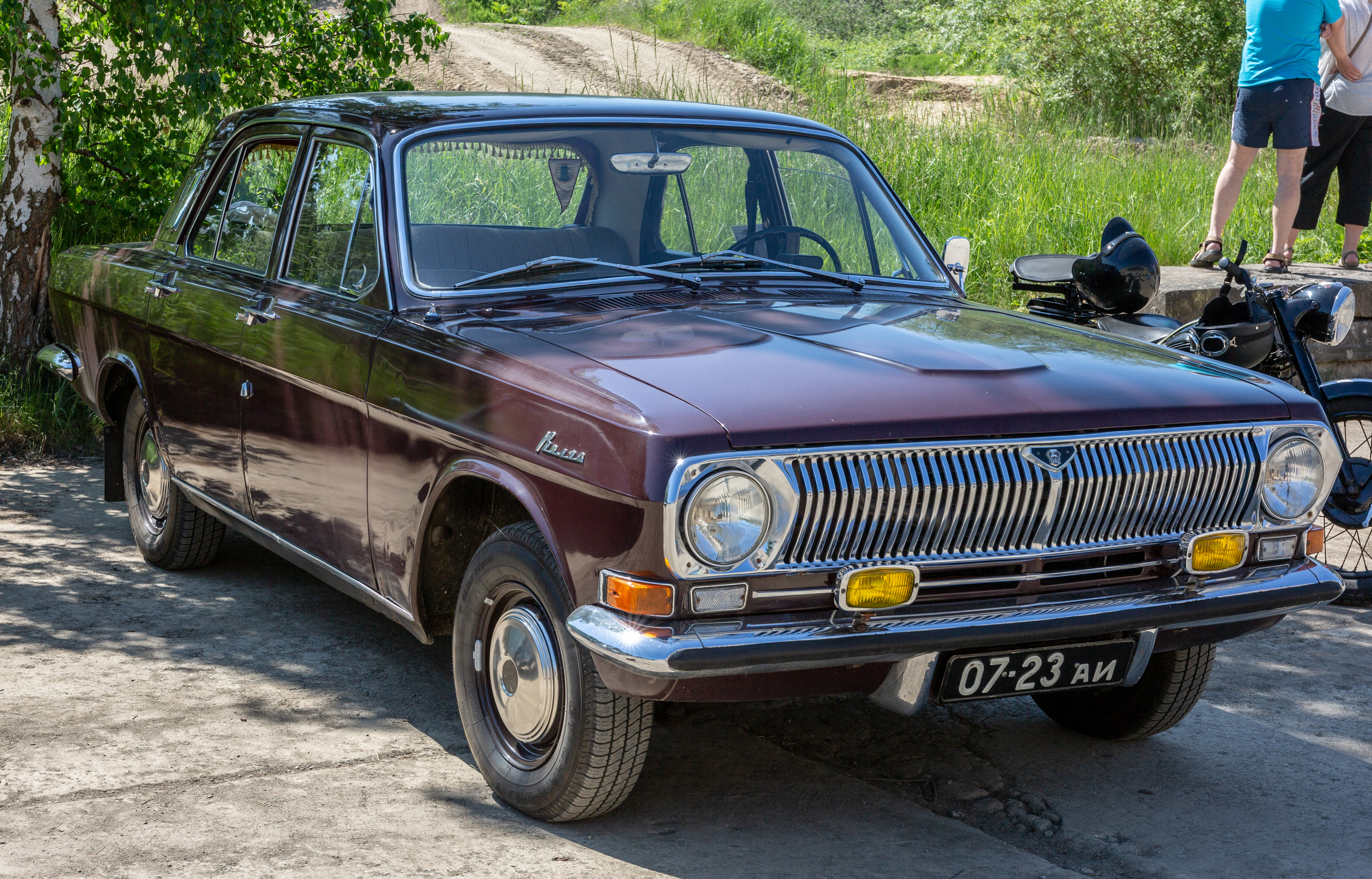

Overview
- Production: 1970–1977

Body and chassis
- Body style: 4-door sedan; 5-door wagon

Powertrain
- Engine: 2.5 L ZMZ-24 I4; 5.5 L ZMZ-2424 V8
- Transmission: 4-speed manual; 3-speed automatic (V8 only)

Dimensions
- Wheelbase: 2,800 mm (110.2 in)
- Length: 4,735 mm (186.4 in)
- Width: 1,800 mm (70.9 in)
- Height: 1,490 mm (58.7 in)
- Curb weight: 1,420–1,765 kg (3,131–3,891 lb)

The GAZ-24 was displayed at the London Motor Show in 1970. Full-scale manufacturing started 15 July 1970. Export sales began in 1971. From 1970 until 1974, the Volga remained almost unchanged. Only minor modifications took place in 1972–1973, when the car got a new trunk decklid lock, flat ashtrays in rear doors instead of early ashtrays that were built in rear doors armrests, new rear bumper and new radio with more pleasant appearance and modified construction. In 1973, a dashboard with a simulated wood insert appeared (also a "silver" grained finish was used until 1974). After 1973, the ignition switch was moved from the dashboard to beneath the steering wheel, to prevent knee injuries in road accidents, although that was less convenient for the driver. Also in 1974, the Volga got additional parking lights on the C-pillars, akin to the opera lights popular on American cars at the time. The GAZ-24-01 was joined in 1977 by the GAZ-24-07, which was fitted to use liquified propane.

The original strip speedometer was changed to a dial in 1975, the same year the ignition switch was moved from the dash to the steering column. Beginning in 1977, seatbelts were offered.

In 1978, about 1,000 right-hand drive GAZ-24-56s were built for export to India, Pakistan, and Singapore; powered by the Peugeot XDP 4.90 engine, they were not assembled in Belgium, and were the last right-hand drive vehicles GAZ built.

The Volga was a status symbol in the Soviet Union, being large and luxurious, with a three-band radio. Unlike the GAZ-21, however, for most of its production lifetime, it was not commonly available to the public; those that were sold required a special permit to purchase them. This would not begin to change until the 1980s.

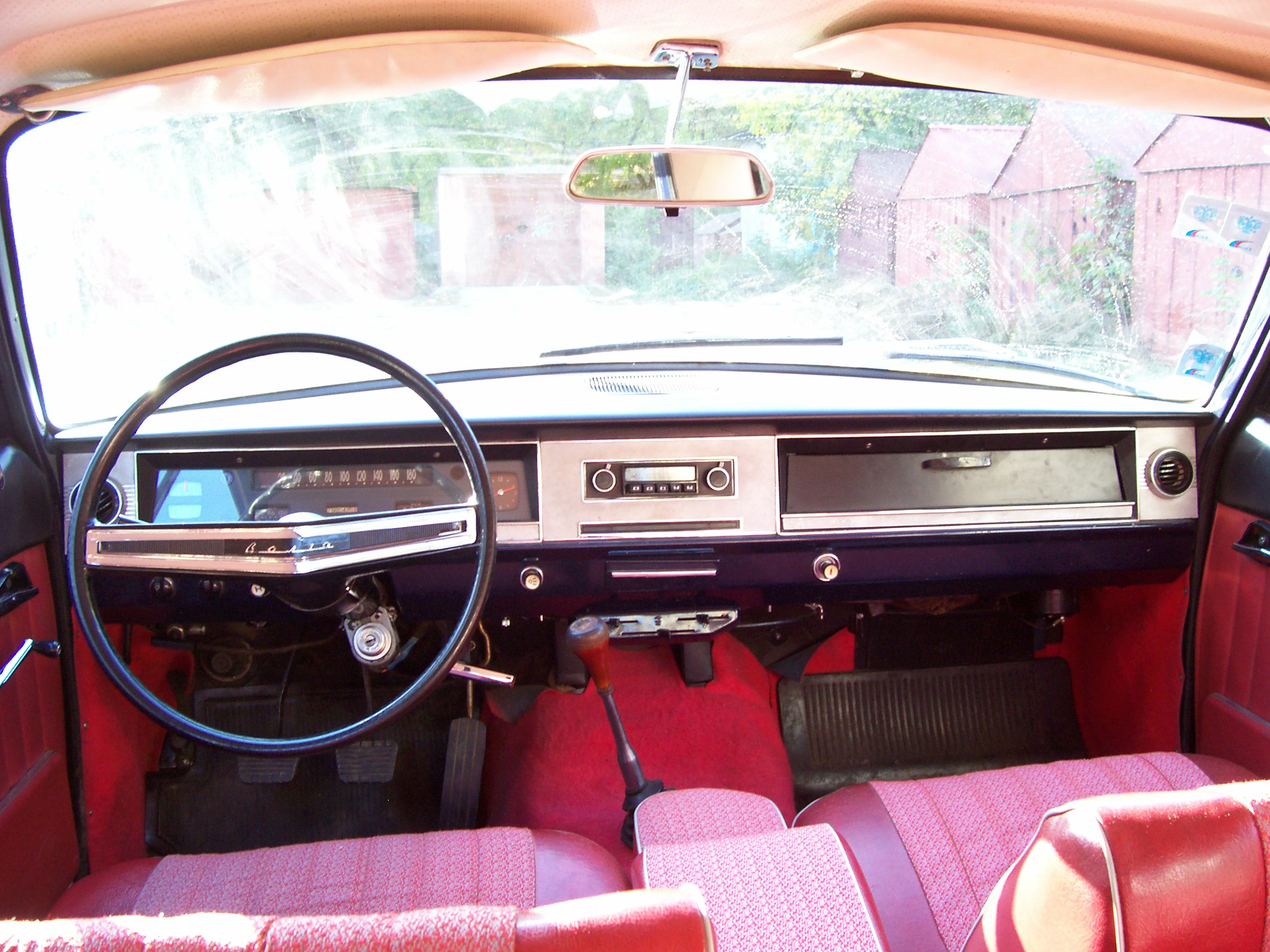
1974 Volga interior – "silver" finished dashboard, central armrest, aftermarket "NORMA" safety belts

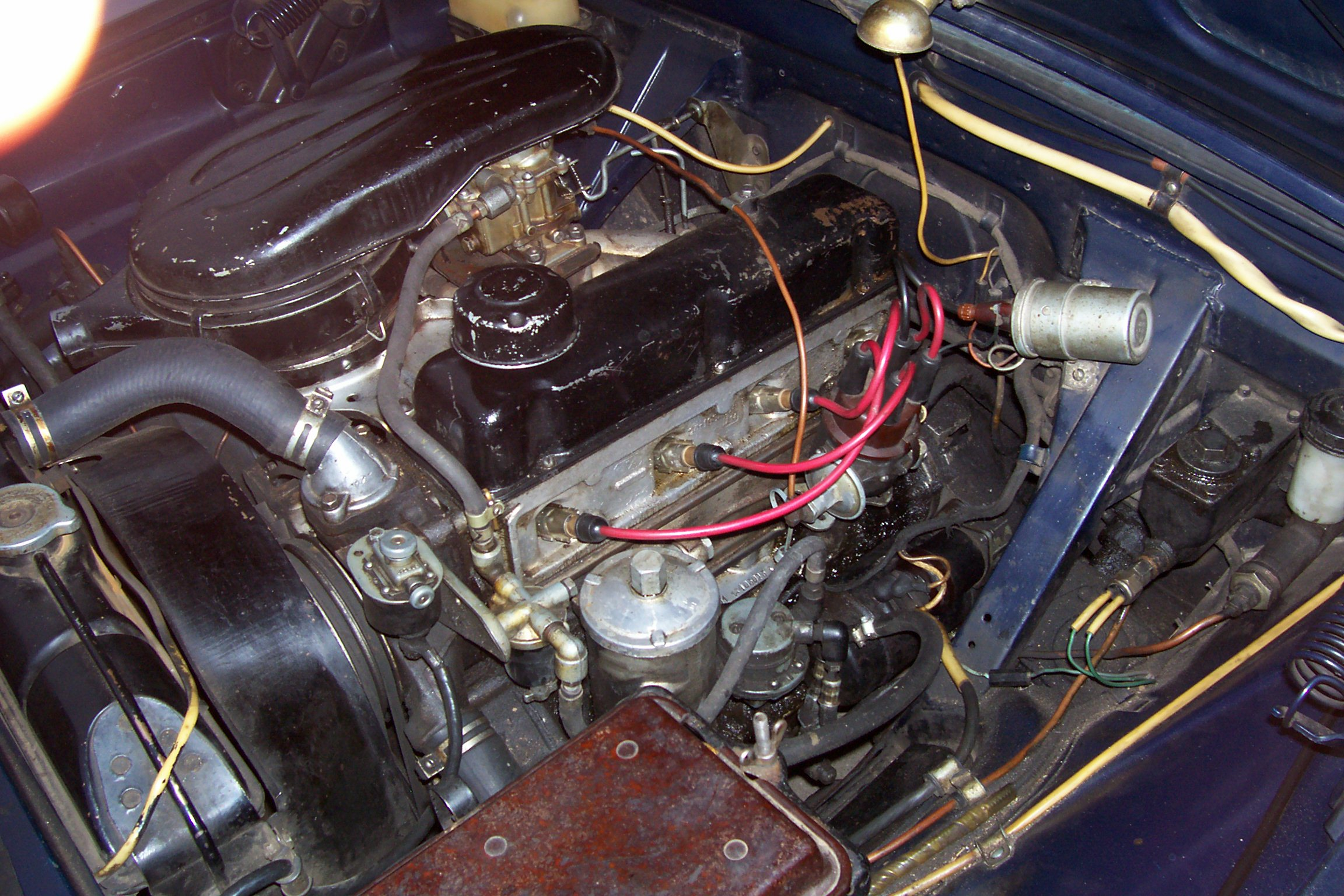
ZMZ-24-01 low-compression engine (standard in taxicabs and an available option on standard sedans)

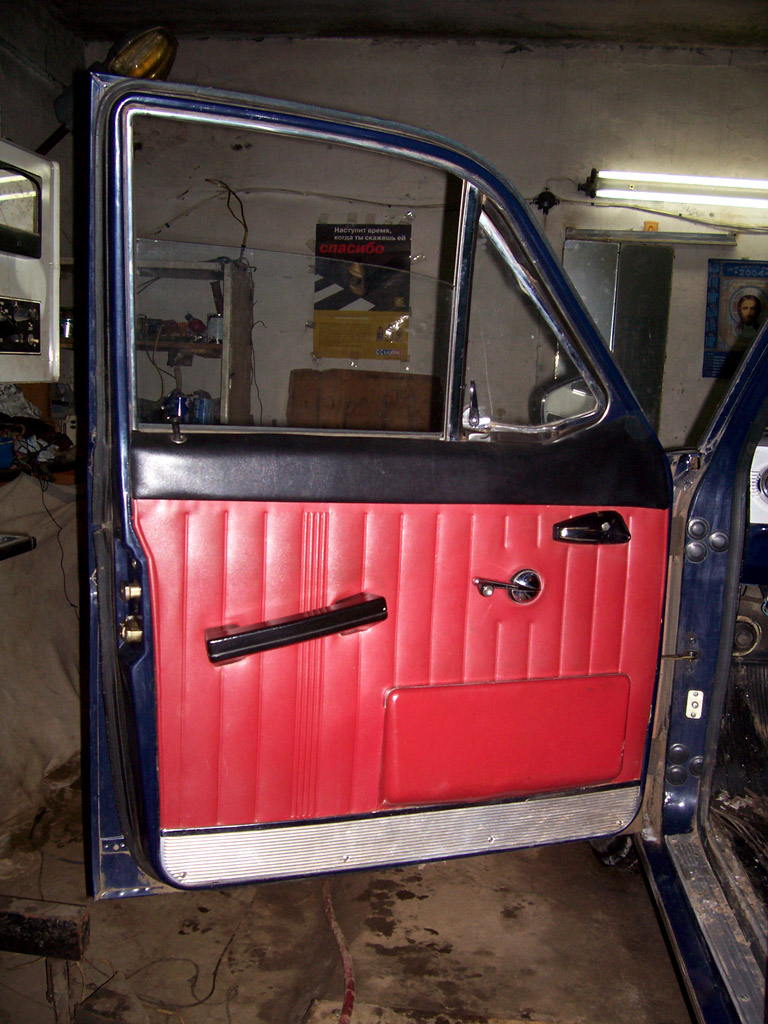
Door panels before 1976

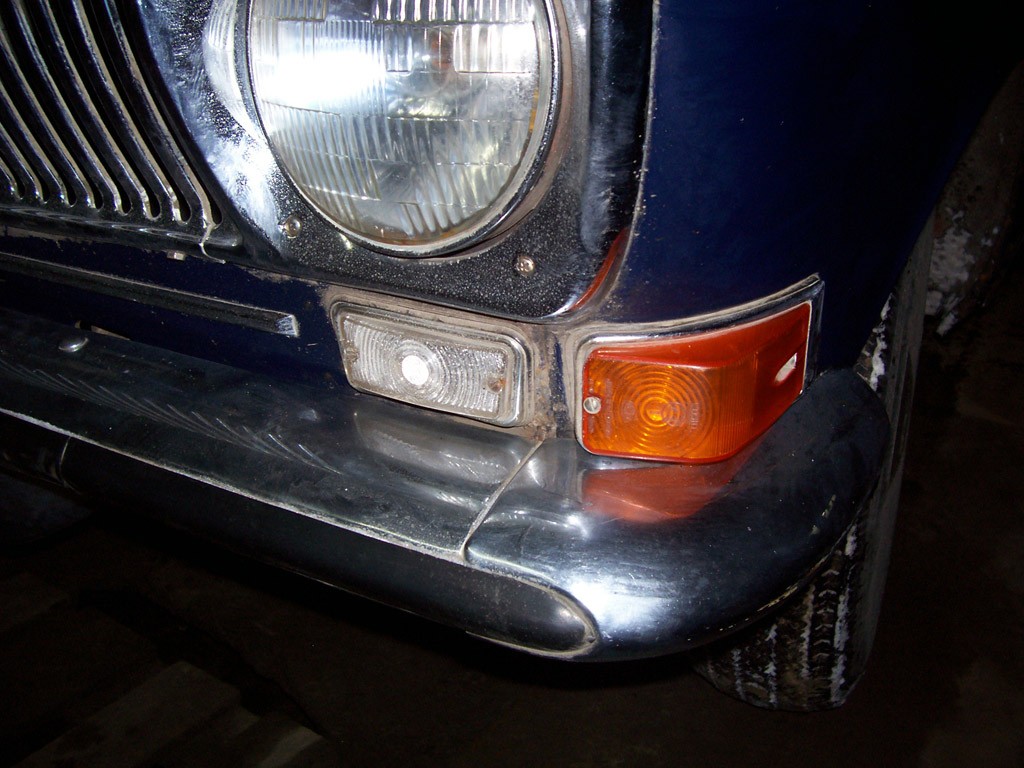
Turn signal and parking light

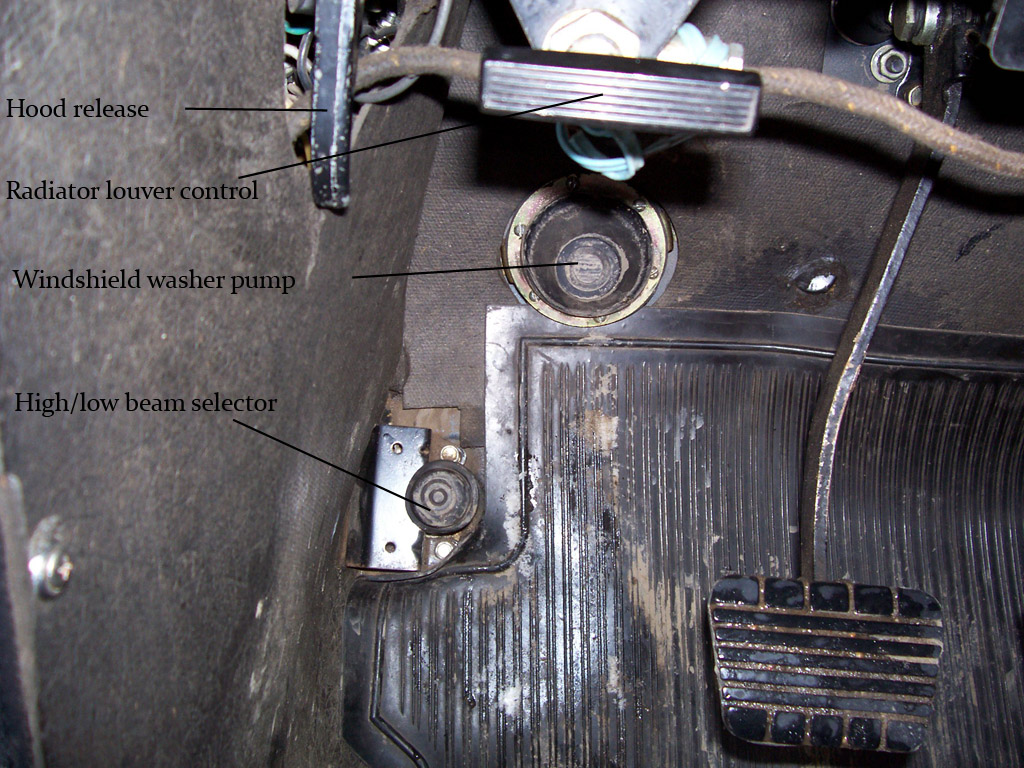
High/low beam selector, windshield-washer pump, radiator louver control, hood release

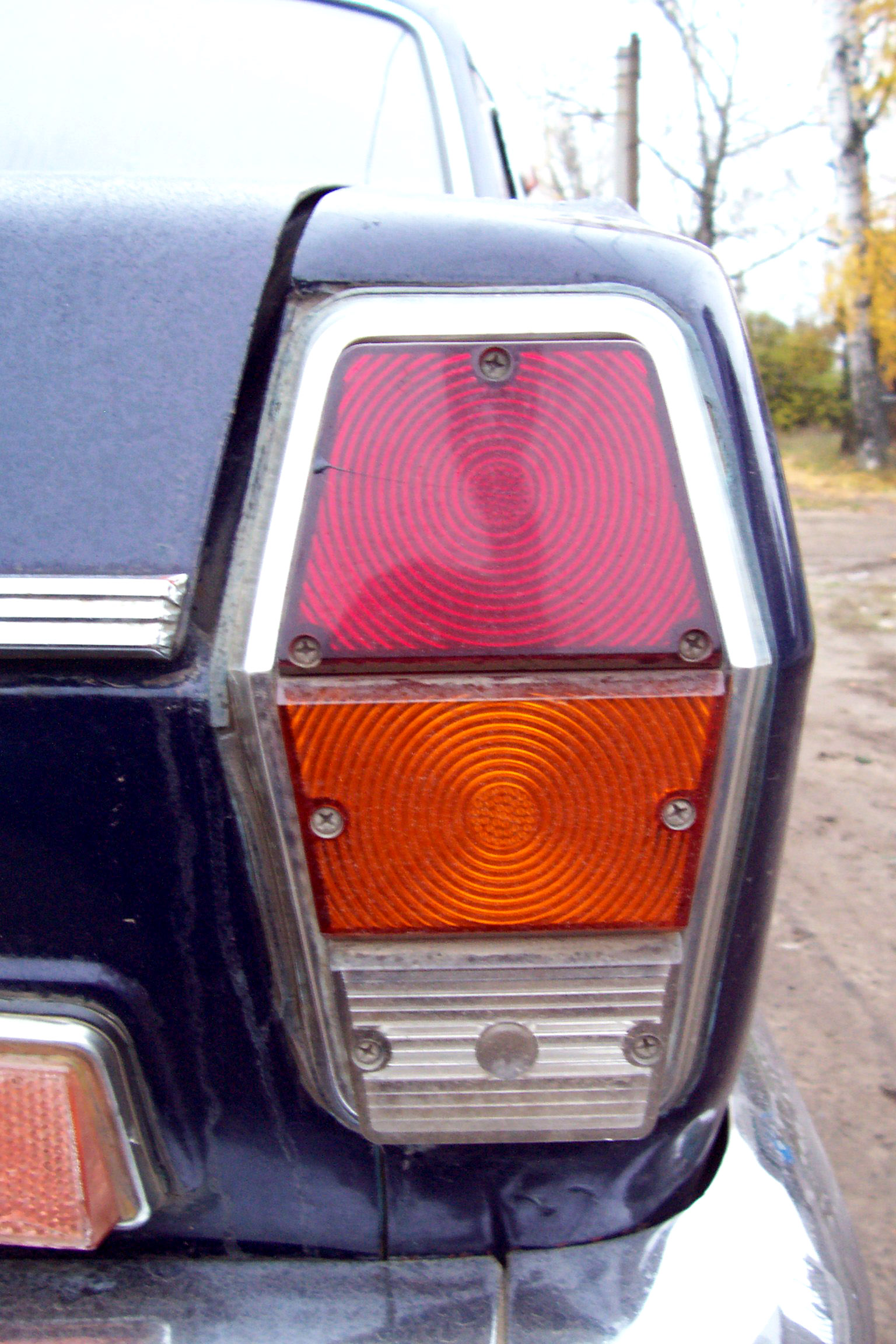
1974 Volga taillight

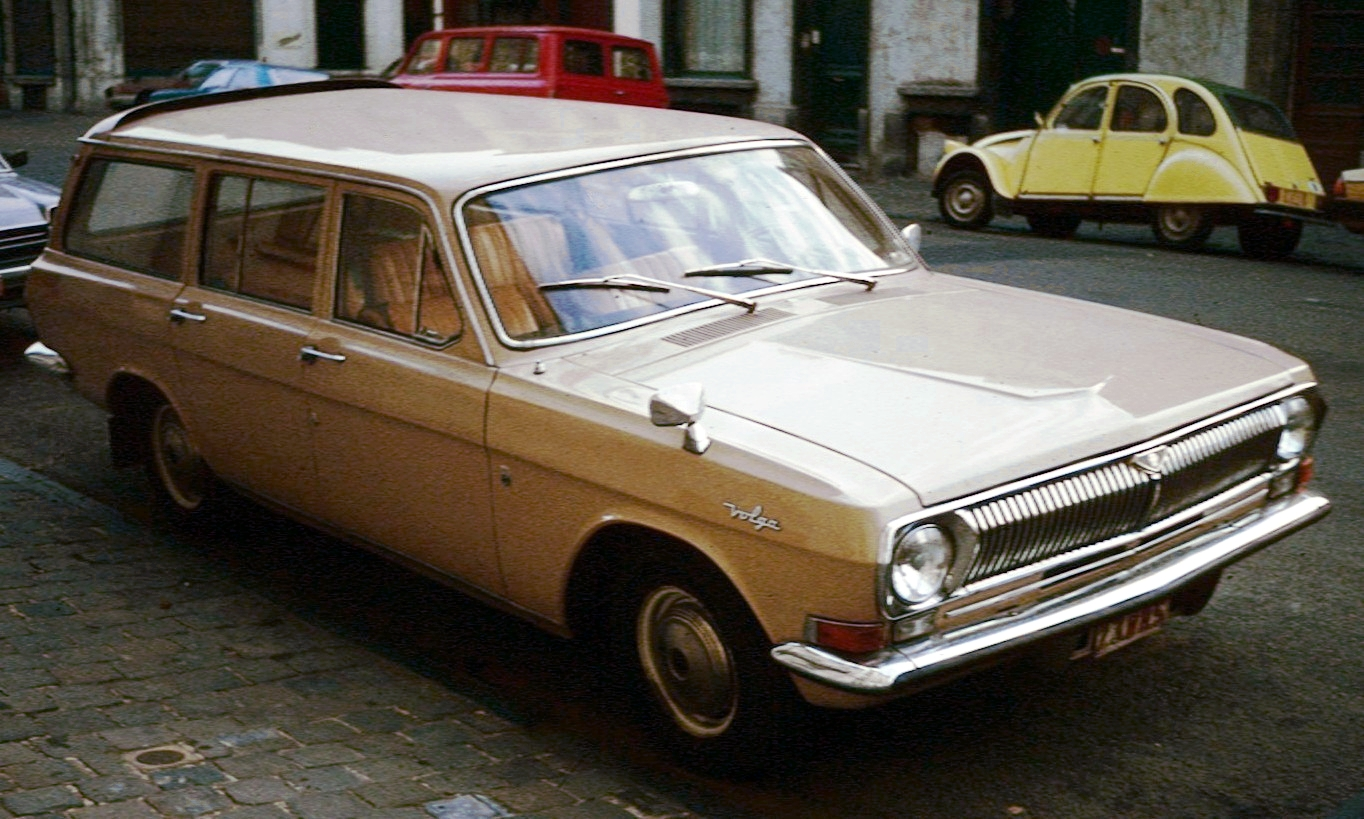
Volga Estate

=== Taxi ===
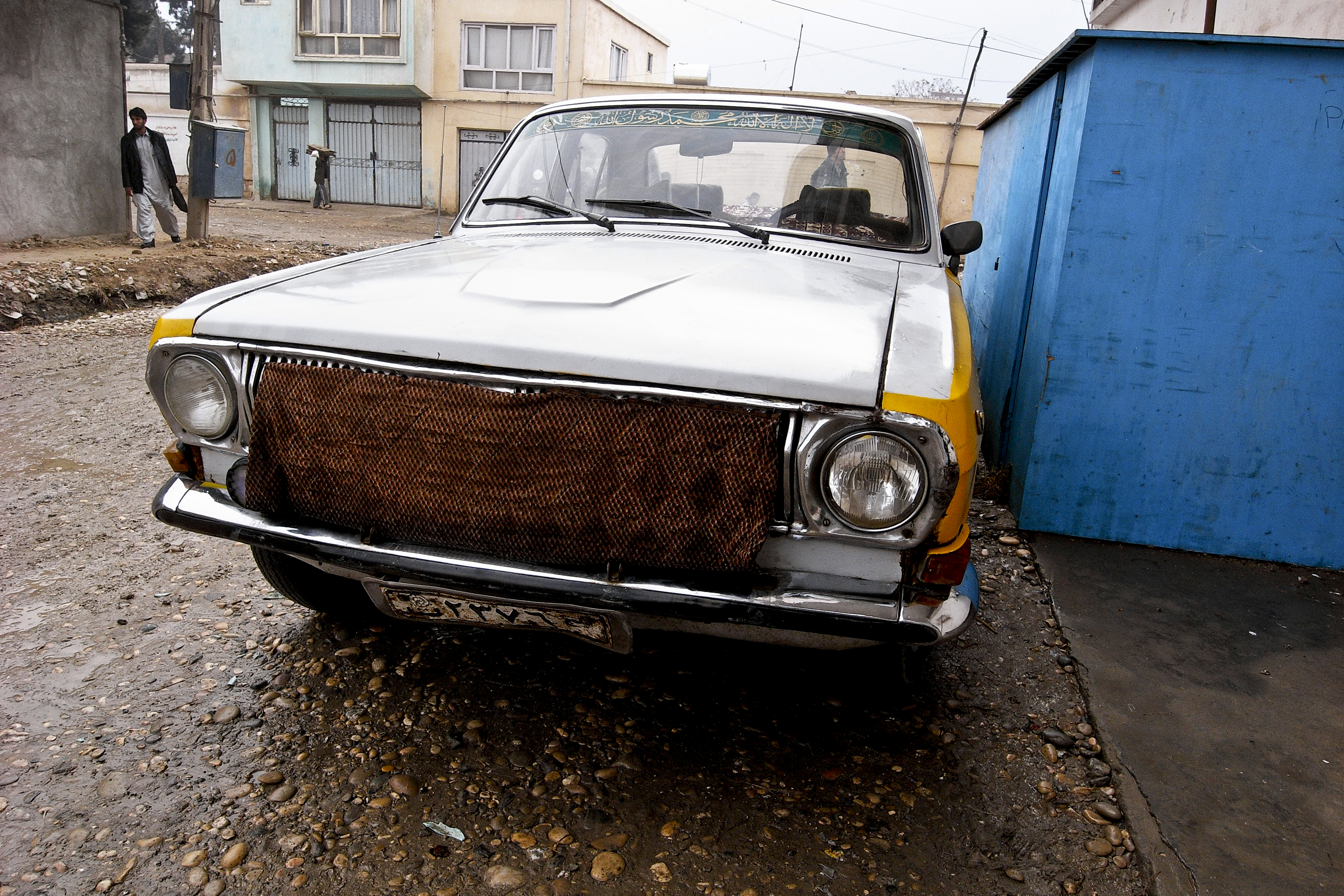
A Volga taxi in Kabul, Afghanistan in 2007

Volga cars were almost the only taxis in the USSR. In 1971, the GAZ-24-01 taxi was introduced. It had cheap and easy-to-wash all-vinyl interior, a low-compression ZMZ-24-01 engine (85 PS, SAE 95 PS) able to run on 76 octane fuel (most commonly available in the Soviet Union), taximeter under the dash, and distinctive checkerboard stripe on front doors. At first, Volga taxis were painted in different light colors; later, most taxis were painted in lime-yellow. The GAZ-24 is still famous for its roadworthiness and durability. Volga taxicabs often have more than 1,000,000 km (620,000 mi) on their odometers, and several engine rebuilds. Taxicab drivers nicknamed GAZ-24 sedan the "Shrimp" due to its slim appearance (when compared to the GAZ-21, nicknamed the "Holy Cow") and the two "fangs" beneath the front bumper that resembled shrimp's claws. Wagon taxis GAZ-24-04 (station wagons were used as cargo taxies) were nicknamed the "Shed" due to vast interior space; they had a payload of 400 kg (880 lb), due to stiffer rear springs.

=== Station wagon and ambulance ===
In 1972, the GAZ-24-02 four-door station wagon was introduced, fitted with three rows of seats. To inhibit small, private enterprises, Volga wagons were not sold to private owners without special permit. For example, families with many children or sportsmen who had to carry heavy sport equipment (like parachutes) were allowed to purchase a Volga wagon. Famous clown and actor Yuri Nikulin was permitted to own a GAZ-24-02 wagon because he often transported heavy circus equipment. This restriction came from the small volume of GAZ-24-02 production. Wagons were primarily used by hospitals (as ambulances), state-owned shops, taxi companies, Militsiya, GAI, post offices, and other state enterprises. The wagon was sold freely in export markets.

The GAZ-24-02 had generous interior area with three rows of seats and seven- or eight-passenger seating. The area behind the front seat could be converted into a spacious, one-level cargo compartment. The GAZ-24-02 had heavy-duty rear leaf springs (six leaves as opposed to the sedan's five) and could carry up to 400 kg (880 lb), thanks to stiffer rear springs.

The GAZ-24-04 was a taxicab variant of the Volga station wagon with special features similar to those of the sedan taxi.

The ambulance-specification GAZ-24-03 model was introduced in 1973.

In addition, a panel van model was also built in small numbers.

=== Convertible ===
The GAZ never built GAZ-24 convertibles. All convertibles were produced by a military plant in the city of Bronnitsy. They were used for military parades.

=== Pickup truck ===
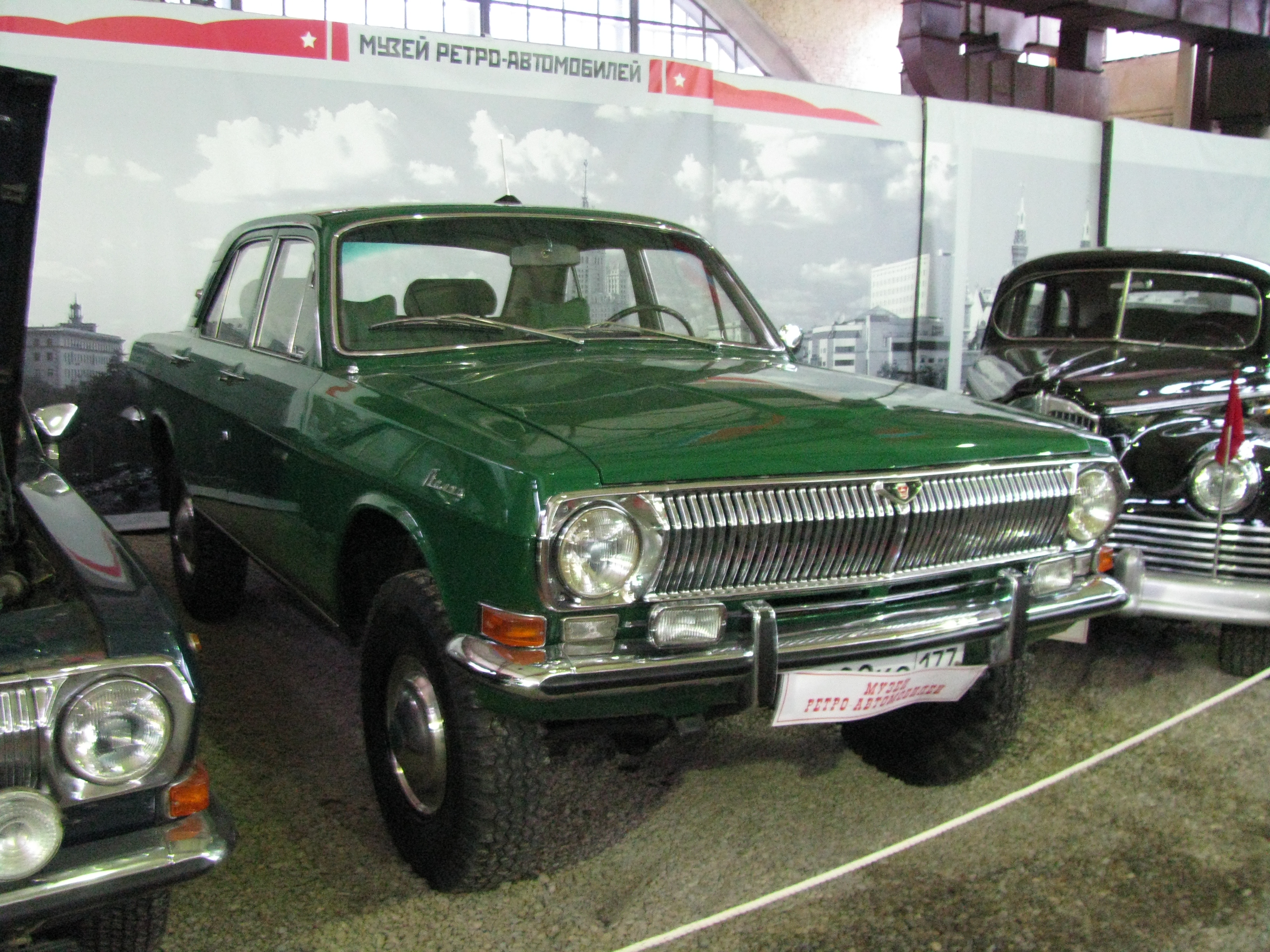
GAZ-24-95

Volga-based pickup trucks were built by different car repairing plants all over the country. Exteriors differed.

=== AWD version ===
During the winter of 1973–74, five AWD GAZ-24-95s were built. It used a UAZ transfer case, with a heavily modified floorpan. The front axle ended up being a Volga rear axle turned backwards, attached to UAZ joints for the steering, with front leaf springs (on stronger frame rails, to carry the greater load). The sump also had to be modified. In all, the changes added 90 kg (200 lb). Some disadvantages were discovered during the tests and this modification remained experimental. One survives in the GAZ plant's museum, another perhaps is in private hands in Nizhny Novgorod.

== 1975–1976 ==
In 1975, the car was slightly modified- a more conventional speedometer and more convenient outside rearview mirror. The engine cooling system was modified to use antifreeze instead of water.

=== V8-powered version ===
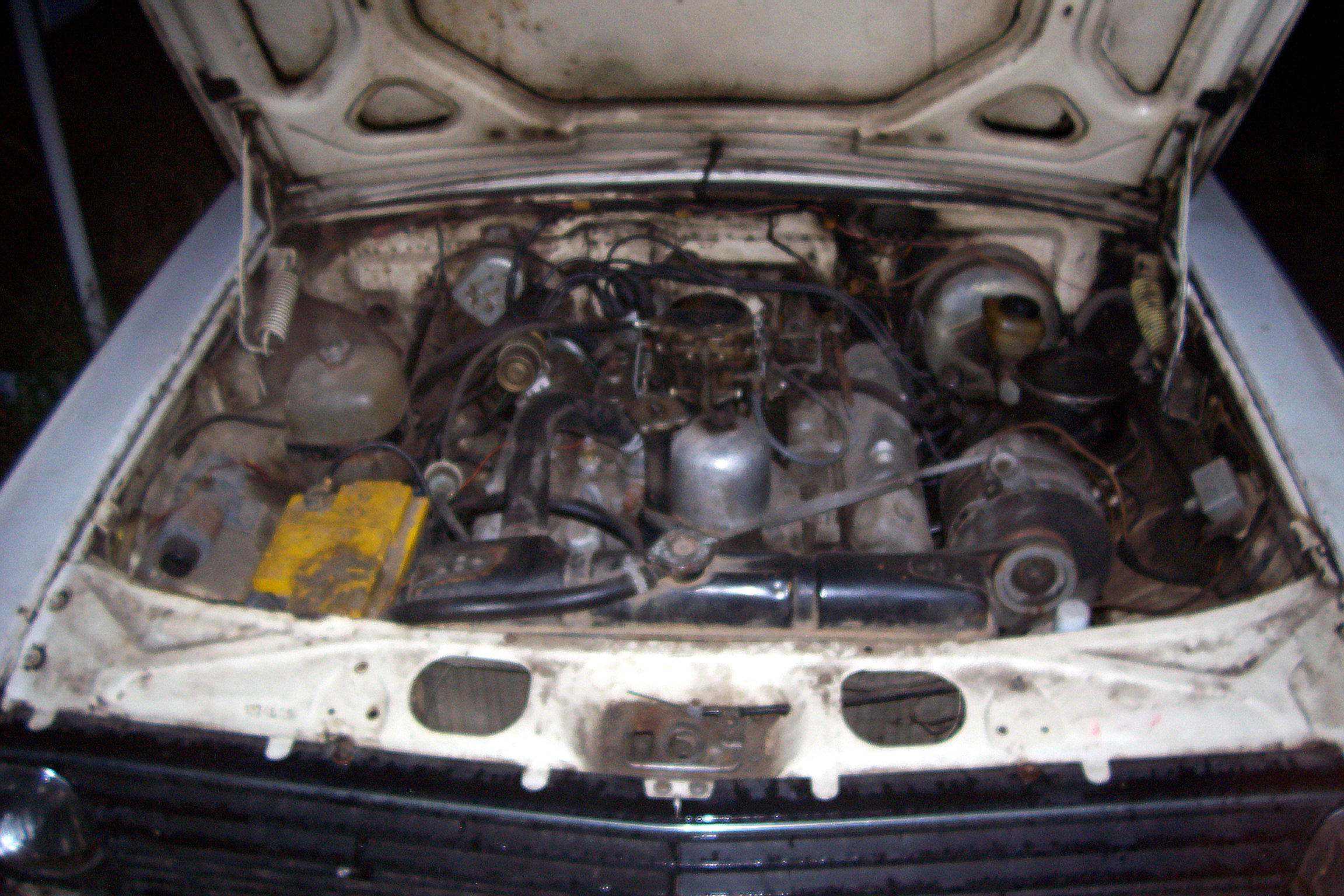
GAZ-24-34 V8 ZMZ-505.10 engine: GAZ-24-24 had almost the same engine (called ZMZ-24-24); 24-34 is a later development of GAZ-24-24 produced after 1985.

From late 1974, a V8-powered version was produced in small numbers, the GAZ-24-24. It received an aluminium 190 PS (140 kW) 5,530 cc (337 cu in) OHV ZMZ-24-24 V8 (derived from the GAZ-13), one four-barrel carburetor, a dual exhaust, three-speed automatic transmission (same as the Chaika), power steering, modified suspension, and a 105 L (28 US gal; 23 imp gal) fuel tank, but the same drum brakes of the standard Volga. This modification is sometimes designated "GAZ 2424", and was nicknamed the "Double" (for having a V8, rather than a straight four) and "Chaser" (Russian: догонялка, dogonyalka). The GAZ-24-24 was used by the KGB as interceptor and security car. It was an outrider vehicle accompanying governmental Chaika and ZIL limousines.

== 1977–1985 ==
Second generation (1977–1985)
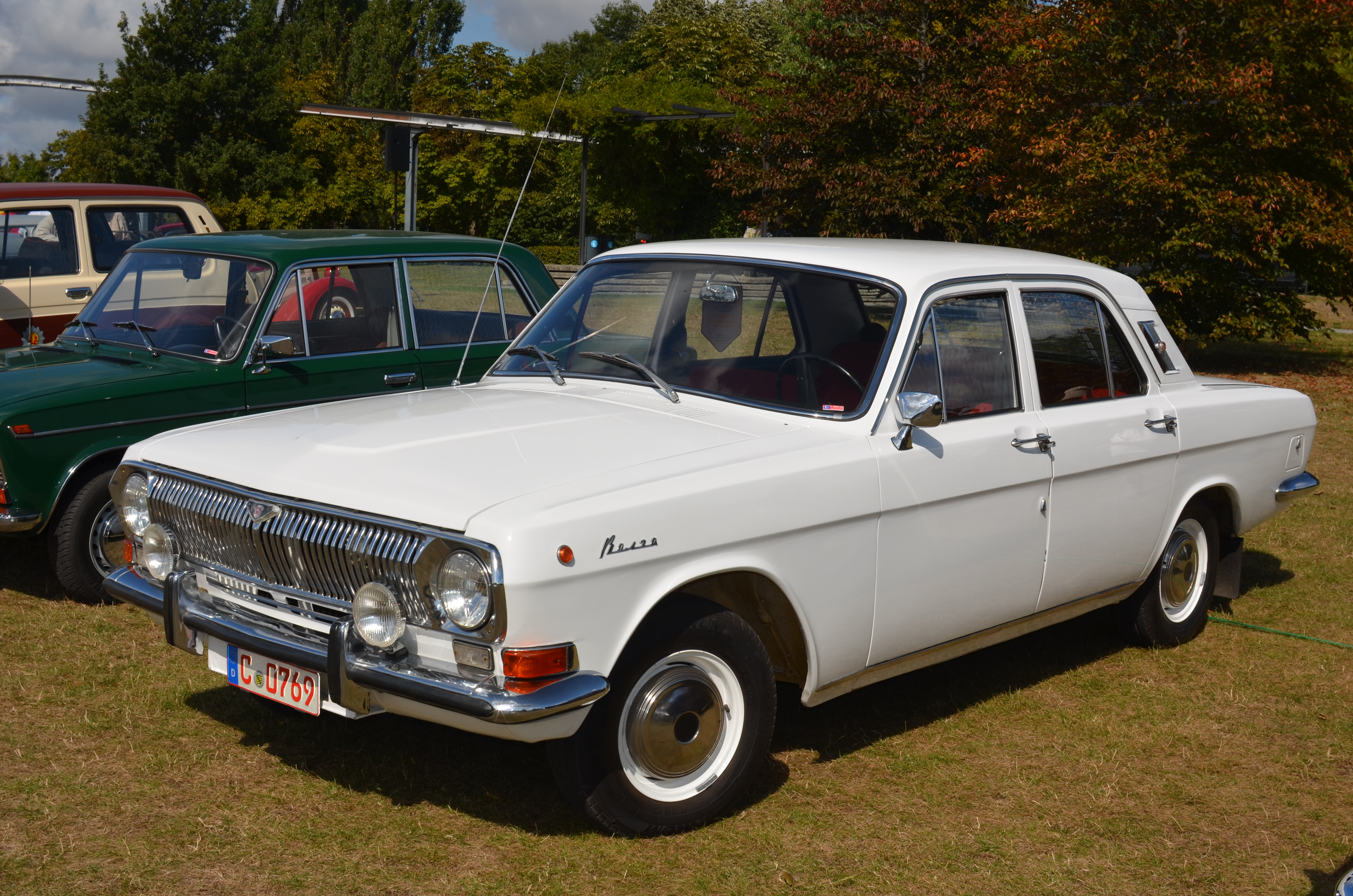

Overview
- Production: 1977–1985

Body and chassis
- Body style: 4-door sedan; 4-door wagon

Powertrain
- Engine: 2.5 L ZMZ-2401 I4; 5.5 L ZMZ-2424 V8
- Transmission: 4-speed manual; 3-speed automatic (V8 only)

Dimensions
- Wheelbase: 2,800 mm (110.2 in)
- Length: 4,760 mm (187.4 in)
- Width: 1,800 mm (70.9 in)
- Height: 1,490 mm (58.7 in)

In 1976–78, the car was lightly refreshed. To improve the safety, bumper guards, yellow front fog lamps, secondary turning signals on front fenders and seat belts (both front and rear) became standard equipment. The car got modified interior. New dashboard consisted of aluminium body and two pieces of soft polyurethane foam padding. Upper door panels had the same construction. Lower door panels were completely different from the previous version. Seats got more convenient vinyl-and-cloth upholstery with cloth seat cushion. Due to installation of seatbelts, the front central armrest was eliminated. A new interior was available in red, brown, yellow, lime green, dark green, dark blue, or black. Interior trim became nonreflective.

=== Olympiad '80 ===
For the 1980 Summer Olympics, a special fleet of Volga sedans and station wagons was built with special two-tone white and yellow paint. They accompanied the Olympic Torch. The colour scheme was chosen by the local Moscow organizers, not the IOC- that year's Winter Games fleet was light blue (Ford products).

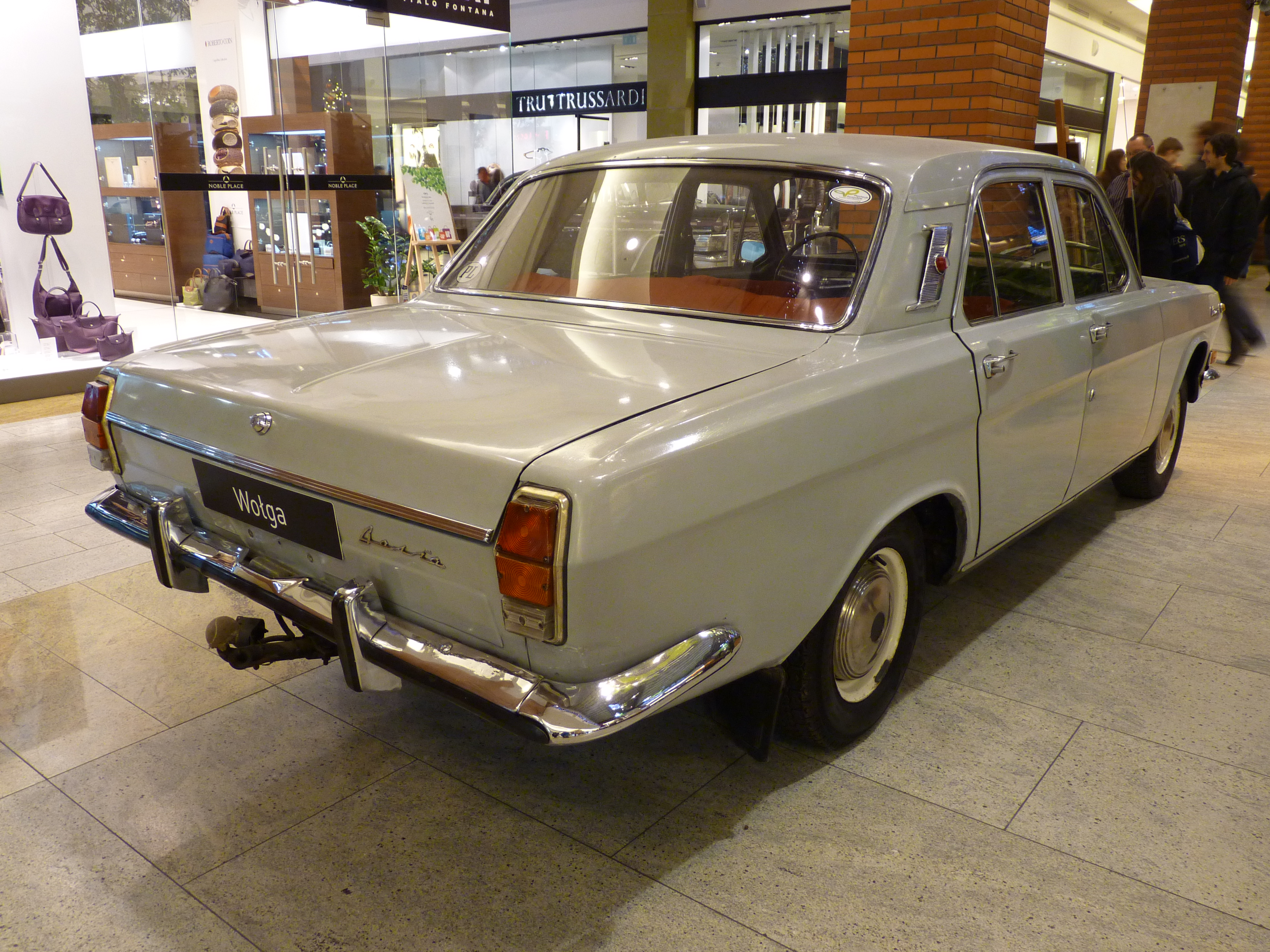
Rear view

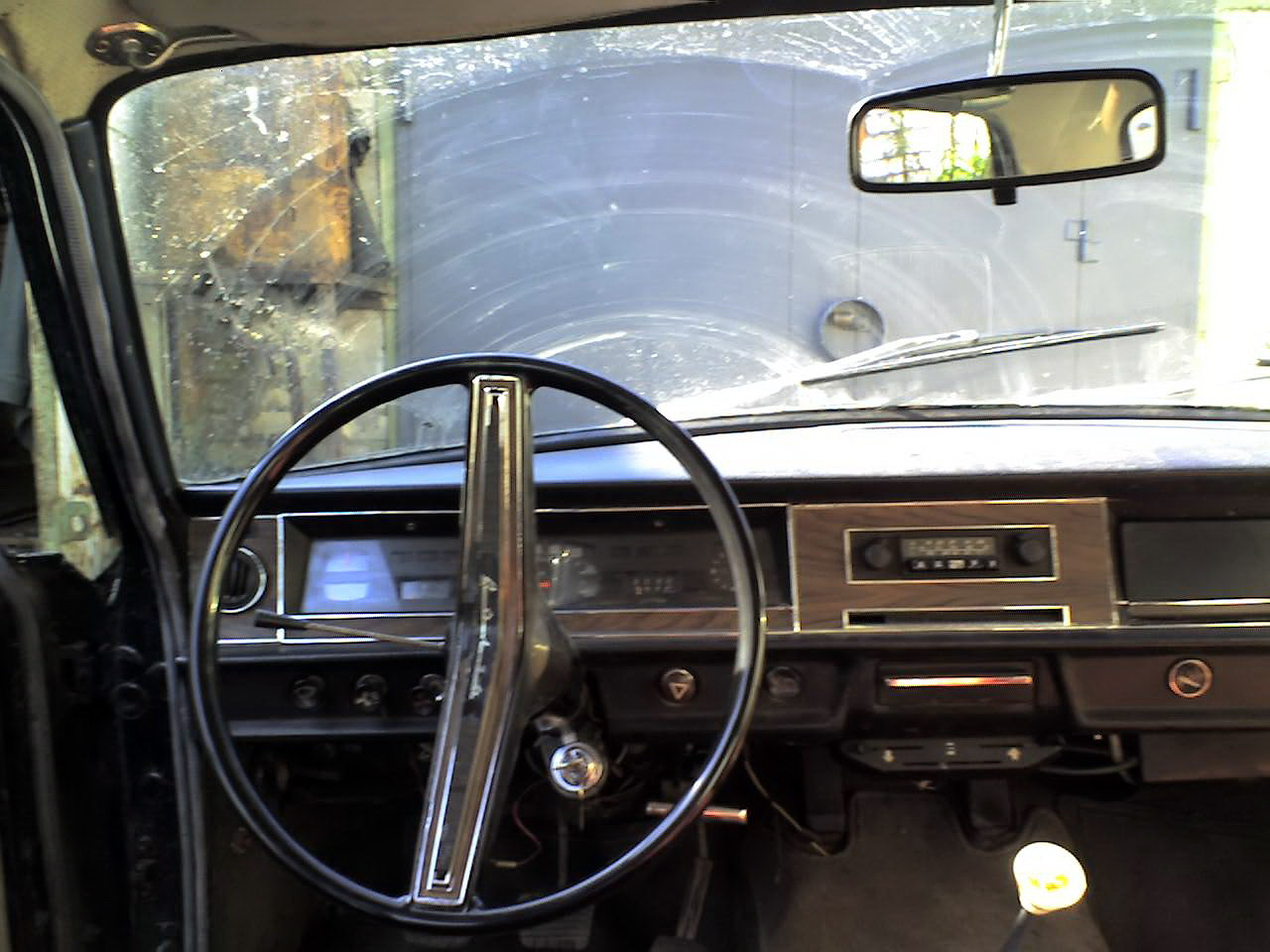
A 1979 Volga interior

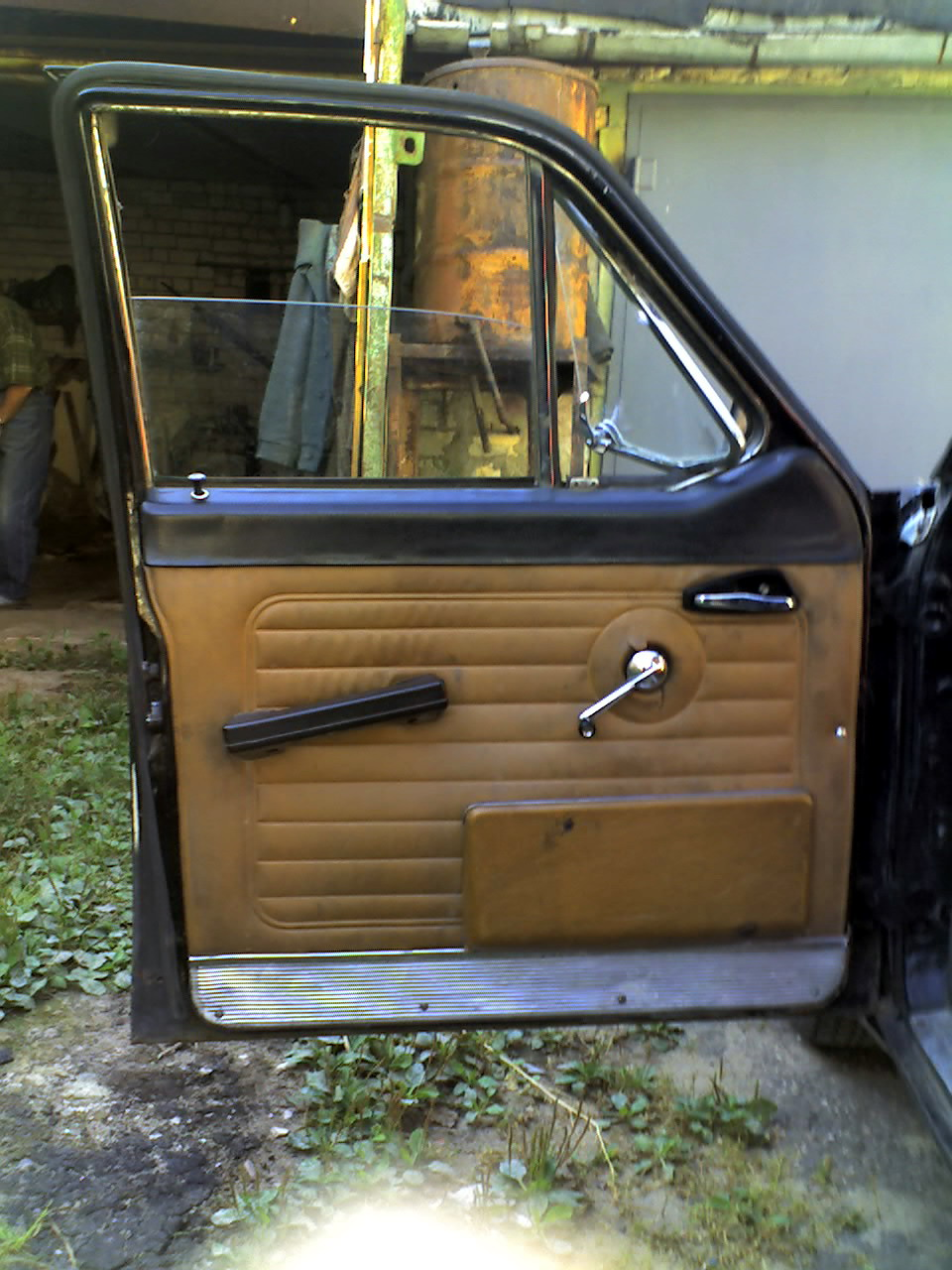
Door panels after 1976

== GAZ-24-10 ==
GAZ-24-10 Volga
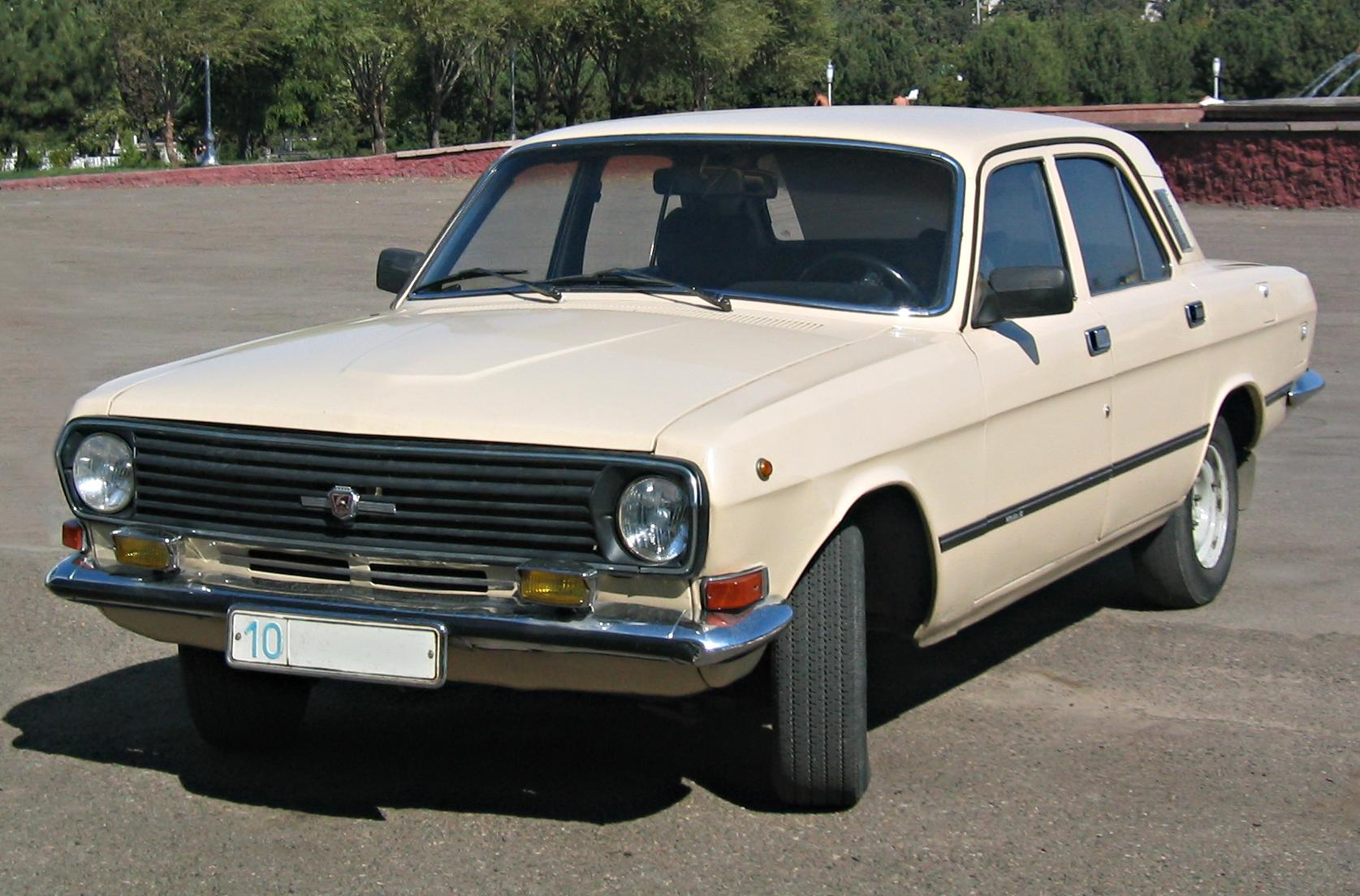

Overview
- Production: 1986–1992; 1987–1992 (estate)

Body and chassis
- Body style: 4-door saloon/sedan 5-door estate/wagon (GAZ-24-12)
- Related: GAZ-3102; GAZ-31029; GAZ-3110; GAZ-31105

Powertrain
- Engine: 2.445 L ZMZ-402.10/ZMZ-4021.10 I4; 5.53 L ZMZ-2434 V8 (GAZ-24-34); 5.53 L ZMZ-505 V8 (GAZ-24-34)

Chronology
- Successor: Volga GAZ-3102; Volga GAZ-31029

The Volga GAZ-24-10 was an updated version of the GAZ-24 built from 1985 to 1992.

When the Soviet of Ministers authorised the long-delayed assembly of the GAZ-3102 in 1981, hope arose that a full upgrade of the production line would follow, but as the first 3102s left Gorky for government garages in 1982, lobbying by GAZ for mass production of such a car would be pointless. Not only did no political support exist, but the cost of refitting the plant also would be too high. A more feasible route was thus chosen to use most of the features of the 3102 and retrofit them to the GAZ-24, in a simplified format. Yet a further two years were needed to gain this approval from Moscow, whose leadership was preoccupied with the political aftermath following the death of Leonid Brezhnev to allow for a modernisation to begin. The "upgrade" was thus done in several stages, mechanical and body.

Compared to the GAZ-3102, it was a retrograde step, but nonetheless progress vis-à-vis the GAZ-24. Coincidentally, its introduction took place during the ascendency of Mikhail Gorbachev and the country entering into a new era—perestroika. The cultural impact of the GAZ-24-10 was relatively small, yet it was nonetheless iconic for the period. This was in part due to its greater availability to the general public as part of the liberalisation programme. With the 3102 capitalising the prestige and exclusivity of the Volga brand, the GAZ-24-10 is merited at upholding its practical role. Thus, despite its obvious archaism in terms of design, and despite never being exported outside the Eastern Bloc, the GAZ-24-10 was a success overall. Its price was 16,300 rubles, compared to 15,300 for the 3102.

=== Technical details ===
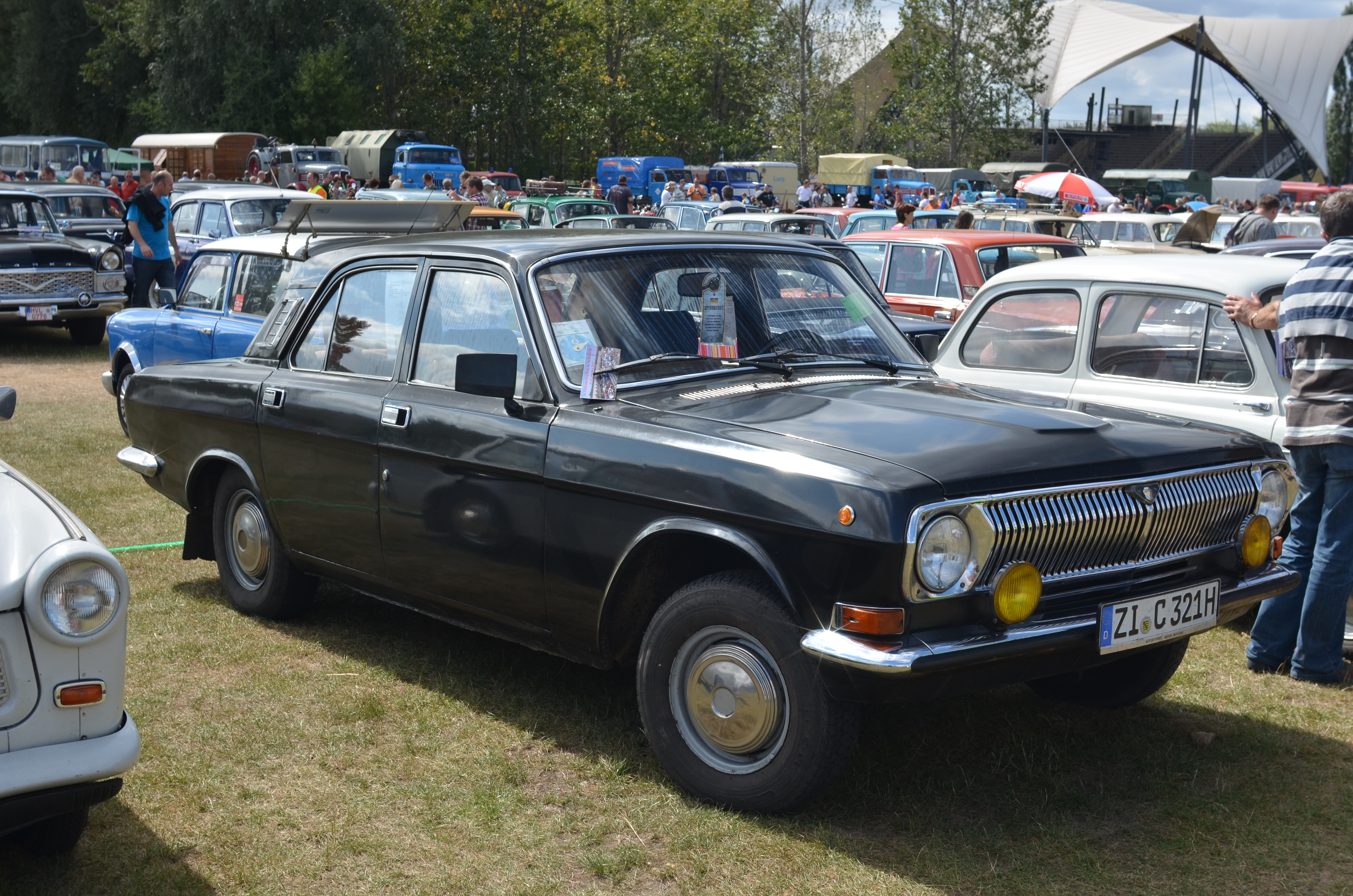
GAZ-24-10 (early)

For the mechanical upgrade, work began with the engine, in accordance to the new standard now known as ZMZ-402. This produced 100 hp (75 kW; 100 PS), but needed 92 octane petrol. The other option was the ZMZ-4021, which gave 90 PS (66 kW) but only needed the more common 76 octane. The main novelty of the ZMZ-4022 was stratified charge ignition. This was immediately ruled out, due to its complication for the mass-produced car. Other changes, however, were retained. These included fingerless crankshaft bearing caps, new cast-iron camshaft supports with no bushings, inlet and outlet valves of increased diameter with double-wound-springs, a new water pump, a vibration damper on the crankshaft pulley, contactless ignition system with a new alternator, new spark plugs, and an upgraded K-126GM carburettor. Some cars featured the K-151 carburettor with a paper air filter (as opposed to the traditional oil-bath filter), and an idle fuel cutoff solenoid with exhaust gas recirculation. These would often carry the aluminium cylinder block from the ZMZ-4022. Power was now 100 hp (75 kW; 100 PS). 0 to 100 km/h (0 to 62 mph) took 19 seconds, top speed was 147 km/h (91 mph), and fuel economy 9.3 L/100 km (30 mpg_{‑imp}; 25 mpg_{‑US}). The GAZ-3102's braking system was also improved, with a tandem brake cylinder that featuring a dual-chambered vacuum servo and pressure regulator on the rear brakes; the 3102's front disk brakes were left out. The 3.9:1 rear axle, clutch, and 205/70R14 radial tyres with "aerodynamic" hub cups were also carried across. The dashboard and steering wheel were also from the 3102 parts bin.

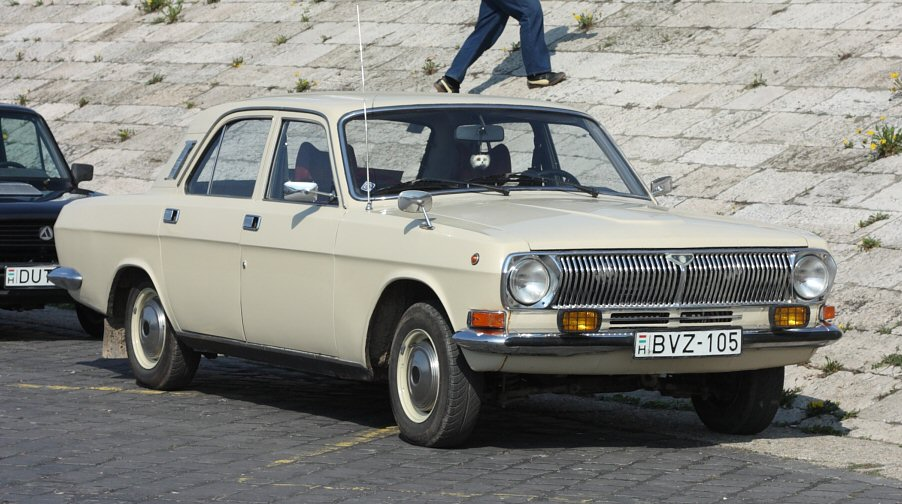
GAZ-24-10 (early)

With these additions, the Volga was shown in a 1984 Soviet car show and in early 1985 the first cars left the assembly line as "hybrid" cars with the GAZ-24-10 mechanicals and GAZ-24 bodies (unofficially called GAZ-24Ms); only in 1986 were "pure" GAZ-24-10s offered. The second part of the modernisation was the interior. Most of the 3102's layout, including separate front seats with headrests, was carried across. However, the cars differed; the 3102's trim was velour, whereas the GAZ-24-10 received standard fabric cloth. The dashboard of the GAZ-3102 was made of shock-absorbing foam with a coloured finish, while the mass-produced Volga had to do with hard black plastic. Though the exact layout of switches and ventilation outlets differed, the instrument clusters were identical. The GAZ-24-02 estate was similarly upgraded in 1986 to become the GAZ-24-12, with production beginning in 1987.

For the exterior, GAZ developed a simplified project repeating the 3102's silhouette, but in a much simplified trim, with many chrome details, notably the "baleen" grille and the bumpers replaced by black plastic. Given that the car was to serve a temporary role, it was chosen to avoid replacing the body panels on grounds of cost, with the exception of the doors. To somehow improve the car's aesthetics, a novel decision was chosen to simplify the look. Thus, most of the chrome details were removed: the boot lip trim, the cursive "Волга" name on the front fenders, mirrors, and the wipers were now painted black. The bumper over riders were also removed, as was the comfort light on the C-pillar ornament. Marker lights were integrated into the headlamp, and rectangular fog lamps replaced the circular ones. As a final touch, the baleen radiator grille was replaced by a black plastic one (originally developed for export models to Benelux countries that were retrofitted with local diesels). Introduced in April 1986, this completed the transition. The estate underwent the same changes, but its standardization into GAZ-24-12 was delayed until early 1987 due to a relatively minor reason: the new spare wheel couldn't fit the niche in the cargo compartment well enough, so after the attempts to redesign the cargo compartment structure itself were dropped, a mechanism with a belt and a handle was implemented to pull the wheel out of its niche smoothly; V. Reutov, who oversaw the redesign, supposedly took inspiration from a similar component in Mercedes-Benz buses.

=== Versions ===
As the car was but an upgrade, it did not receive a new type name. As it was significantly different from the previous GAZ-24, it was issued the -10 suffix. The taxi (which retained its 80 RON petrol) was thus GAZ-24-11, the estate GAZ-24-12, ambulance GAZ-24-13, taxi estate GAZ-24-14, and the natural gas-powered was GAZ-24-17.

The limited-production V8 chaser models were now called GAZ-24-34. These were initially fitted with the ZMZ-24-34, an updated version of the GAZ-24-24 engine with a closed crankcase ventilation, but were modernized into the 195 PS (143 kW) ZMZ-503.10 V8, though a few are believed to have been fitted with 220 PS (162 kW) dual-carburettor ZMZ-505.10s derived from the ZMZ-14/Chaika. The GAZ-24-34 was produced between 1987 and 1992.

== Derivative models ==
The RAF-2203 "Latvija" van by Rīgas Autobusu Fabrika (in production 1976–97) was based on drivetrain and suspensions of GAZ-24 Volga.

The GAZ-24 remained the last mass-produced car of GAZ. A successor was never successfully developed. Instead, since 1982, a slightly longer, facelifted, and with a more luxurious interior version was produced as the GAZ-3102. This was not intended to be a direct GAZ-24 replacement but a more luxurious derivative. For this purpose, the GAZ-31029 was developed, a simplified and cheaper version of the GAZ-3102. The GAZ-31029 itself was later facelifted and renamed the GAZ-3110 and then the GAZ-31105. Production eventually ended in 2010. There were attempts to create modern successor models, partially derived from Western designs, such as the GAZ-3105, GAZ-3111, and then the Volga Siber, but these were all unsuccessful, and with the exception of the Volga Siber, only a few dozen cars were produced.

== International variants ==
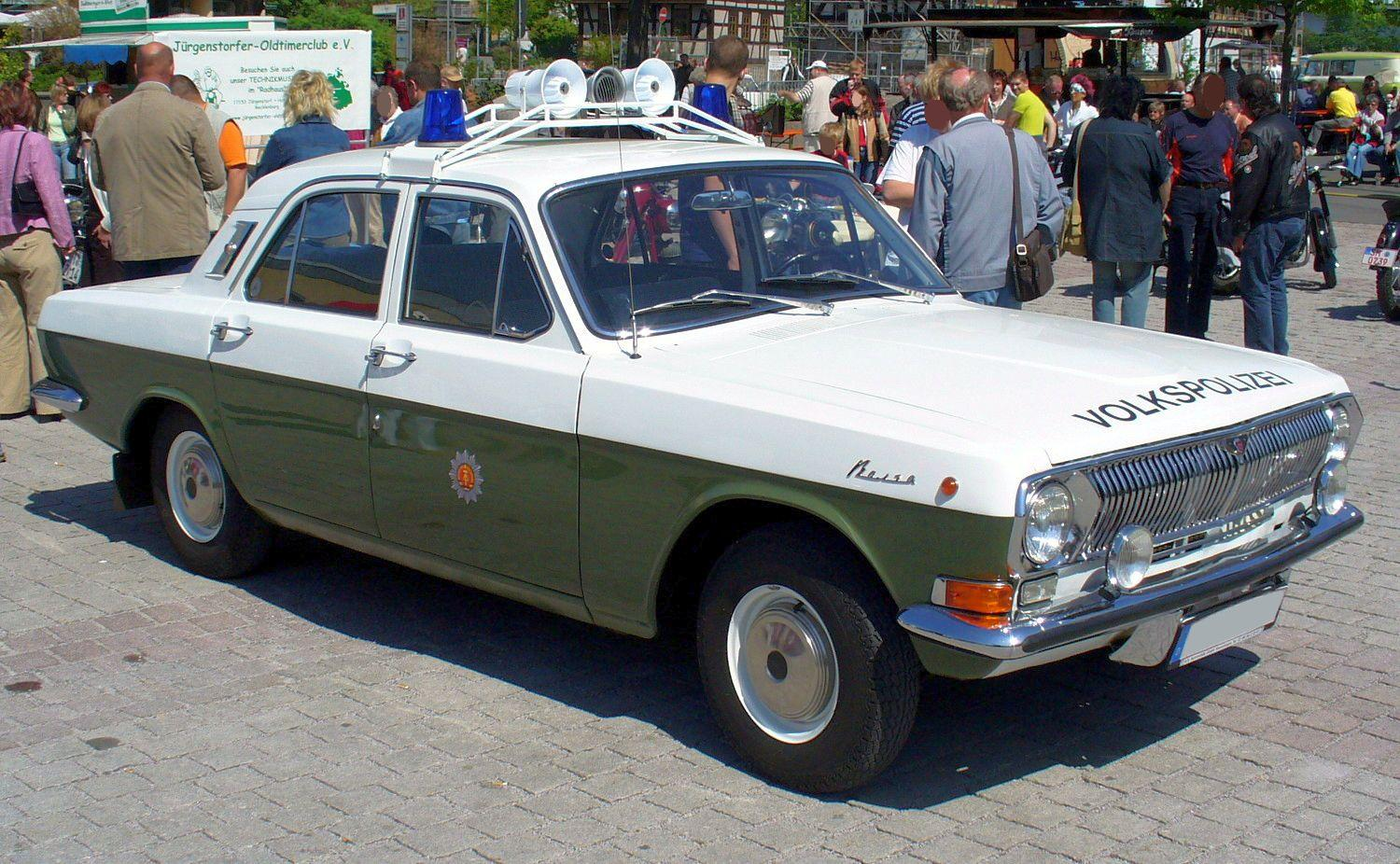
A Volga GAZ-24 of the East German Volkspolizei

The GAZ-24 Volga was exported to many countries, from Indonesia and Latin America to Western Europe. Right-hand drive export versions also existed. In Europe, some of the most popular Volgas were cars, both sedans and wagons, assembled in Antwerp by Scaldia-Volga S.A. These cars were shipped to Belgium without engines, where they were fitted with Indenor diesels (the same as in the Peugeot 404), a 2.1-litre unit with 62 PS (46 kW) until the 2300 D was introduced for 1980. The 2.3-litre XD2 has 70 PS (51 kW). Those models were called M24D and M24DB (Break, station wagon), and also a "Luxe" version was made. Standard Volgas with Soviet engines were sold as M24 and M24B (Break). Cars that were sold in Europe often had such features as metallic paint, simulated vinyl roof, leather interior and other luxuries. Station wagons sometimes had simulated "wood" decoration and often a rear window wiper and heater. These features were usually installed by local European GAZ dealers.

The petrol engine began disappearing from Western European price lists towards the end of the 1970s. The Volga offered good value for money, with the retail price being lower than that of a Volkswagen Golf Diesel, but the resale value was abysmal. Sales were never significant in volume; in 1982 Europe-wide sales of diesel-engined Volgas amounted to 255 cars, followed by 215 more in 1983.

By late 1983, Belgian Volgas were also no longer available with sedan bodywork. The Diesel Break came either as the "N" (Normale) or the better equipped "GL". The car was also sold in Austria, where importer ÖAF-Gräf & Stift referred to it as the "Wolga Attaché GAZ-24." ÖAF-Gräf & Stift stopped bringing in new Volgas after early 1981, although stock continued to be available until the end of the year, and the company also kept providing occasional cars for Czech and Soviet diplomats stationed in Austria. As in most European markets, the car found its main market amongst taxi drivers, who appreciated its low price and robustness, while being less concerned with resale values.
