= Nikolai Kozlovsky =

Ukrainian Soviet photographer and educator

- Born: May 8, 1921
- Died: August 15, 1996 (aged 75)
- Occupations: Photographer and teacher

Nikolai Fedorovich Kozlovsky (Ukrainian: Микола Федорович Козловський, 1921–1996) was a Ukrainian Soviet photographer and teacher.

== Biography ==
Nikolai Fedorovich Kozlovsky was born 8 May 1921 in Sumy, now in Ukraine.

== Career ==
In 1937 and 1938, while still in his teens, Kozlovsky photographed at ‘Artek’ children’s ‘pioneer’ camp on the southern coast of the Crimea in the village of Gurzuf, a "treatment camp" for children with tuberculosis, diseases of the nervous system, overfatigue and anemia, which by the beginning of the 1930s, had been made a year-round facility. Kozlovsky’s photographs show the children, sometimes dressed in sailor’s uniform, sunbathing, playing snooker, sightseeing and sounding the bugle.

His first serious photo piece was titled "Ukrainian Nuremberg", depicting a trial of Nazis that took place in Kiev's Maidan Nezalezhnosti in January 1946.

== Magazine photographer ==
In 1948 he joined the magazine Ogonek in Ukraine as a special photo correspondent, remaining with the magazine for nearly forty years. Many of his photographs are in colour and are in an heroic socialist realist style depicting such scenes as father and son washing their Volga car before going to Stalino [Donetsk], a family of 'Heroes of Socialist Labor' enjoying an al fresco meal in their collective farm in Bedia, Georgia, and tourism in the Carpathians. For the magazine he made portraits of Ukrainian and Soviet personalities Buchma A., M. Krushelnitsky, N. Uzhviy, E. Ponomarenko, Y. Shumsky, N. Romanov, M. Litvinenko-Wohlgemuth, I. Patorzhinskogo, Jura, Z. Gaidai, N. Grishko. He was a prolific photographer of the city of Kiev, recording images which are now a valuable historic record.

Kozlovsky was a teacher of photography, one of his students being the noted Yuri Buslenko (1951–2014).

== International recognition ==
In 1955 Edward Steichen selected Kozlovsky's picture of traditional dancers, discovered by assistant Wayne Miller at the Sovfoto agency, for the ‘Ring a Ring o' Roses’ section of the world touring Museum of Modern Art exhibition The Family of Man, seen by 9 million visitors, and its catalogue, which is still in print. Kozlovsky's photography also featured in a 1984 edition of the magazine Soviet Life distributed in the United States

Kozlovsky's illustrated books were widely distributed and his work was officially recognised in 1986 when he won the Shevchenko National Prize for culture and arts, with his book "Kiev".

The photographer features in Anatoliĭ Sofronov's novel Meetings with Sholokhov

He died on August 15, 1996, in his beloved Kiev.

== Publications ==
Among his creative works are more than 30 photography books, including:

- 1956 «Peyzazhi Zakarpat'ya» ("Landscapes of Transcarpathia”)
- 1959 «Po Zakarpat'yu» (“In Transcarpathia”)
- 1960 «Snova tsvetut kashtany» ("The chestnuts are again in bloom”) with Dmitri Baltermants and Oles Honchar
- 1961 «V bratskoy Bolgarii» ("In fraternal Bulgaria”)
- 1962 «V ob"yektive Yaponiya» (“Japan in the Lens”) circulation 12000.
- 1962 «Cherez 15 morey i 2 okeana» (“Through 15 Seas and 2 Oceans”) circulation 20000.
- 1968 «Desna — krasunya» ("Desna the Beautiful”) Nikolay Kozlovskiy (photography), Oleg Shmelev (text)
- 1969 «Tam gde rozhdayetsya utro» (“Where the Morning Is Born”) with Henry Gurkov. Moscow: Pravda
- 1967 «Karpaty zovut» (“The Carpathians call.”) Kiev: Mystetstvo
- 1967 «Kiyev i kiyevlyane» ("Kiev and the Kievites”) Kiev: Mystetstvo
- 1969 «U nas na Kamchatke» (“Our Kamchatka”) Soviet Russia.
- 1973 «V ob"yektive zhizn'» (“Life in the Lens”) Kiev: Mystetstvo
- 1976 «Kiêve míy» (“My Kiev”) Kiev: Mystetstvo. Circulation: 40000
- 1979 «Kiyev i kiyevlyane» ("Kiev and the people of Kiev”) Kiev: Mystetstvo
- 1981 «Vysokiye paralleli» (“Sublime parallel”) N.Kozlovskiy, L.Ustinov, V.Chin-Mo Tsaya. Circulation 15000
- 1982 «Balet» (“Ballet”) Kiev: Mystetstvo
- 1982«Fotografii» (“Photographs”) Moscow: The Planet, 1982. 28x26 cm. - 20,000 copies
- 1984 «Patonovtsy» On the 50th anniversary of the Institute of Electric Welding. Patona. Kiev: Science. 5000 copies
- 1985 «Po Dnepru. (“On the Dnieper”) Kiev: Mystetstvo
- 1986 «Kiêve míy» (“This is Kiev”) Kiev: Mystetstvo
- 1987 «Kií̈v» (“Kiev”) Kiev: "Mystetstvo", 1987. Circulation 25000 copies. Printed in Yugoslavia, Belgrade
- 1987 «Patonovtsy» 2nd ed., Revised. and expanded. - Kiev: Science, 6700 copies
- 1993 «Kiyev» (“Kiev”). 2nd ed. Kiev: Mystetstvo"

== Awards and Prizes ==
- Honoured Cultural Worker USSR
- The State Prize named for TG Shevchenko (1986) for the photo album "My Kiev"
- Order of the Badge of Honour
- Y. A. Galan Prize
