= Raeton =

Raeton may refer to:

- Changan Raeton, a Chinese midsize saloon
- Changan Raeton Plus, a Chinese midsize saloon
