= Shuysky (disambiguation) =

Shuysky was a Rurikid family of former boyars. Notable people from that family include:

- Dmitry Shuisky (died 1613), Russian boyar
- Mikhail Skopin-Shuisky (1587–1610), Russian statesman
- Vasily Shuysky (1552–1612), or Vasily IV of Russia, Tsar

Shuysky (masculine), Shuyskaya (feminine), or Shuyskoye (neuter) may also refer to:

- Mikhail Shuisky (baritone) (1883–1953), Russian operatic baritone
- Shuysky District, a district of Ivanovo Oblast, Russia
- Shuysky (inhabited locality) (Shuyskaya, Shuyskoye), name of several rural localities in Russia
