= Shuysky (inhabited locality) =

Name of several Russian rural localities

Shuysky (Russian: Шу́йский; masculine), Shuyskaya (Шу́йская; feminine), or Shuyskoye (Шу́йское; neuter) is the name of several rural localities in Russia:

- Shuysky (rural locality), a settlement in Prudovsky Selsoviet of Novosilsky District of Oryol Oblast
- Shuyskoye, Smolensk Oblast, a selo in Shuyskoye Rural Settlement of Vyazemsky District of Smolensk Oblast
- Shuyskoye, Vologda Oblast, a selo in Sukhonsky Selsoviet of Mezhdurechensky District of Vologda Oblast
- Shuyskaya, a station in Prionezhsky District of the Republic of Karelia
