= Grushko =

Grushko is a gender-neutral Slavic surname that may refer to

- Abram Grushko (1918–1980), Soviet painter
- Olga Grushko (born 1976), Kazakhstani volleyball player

== Films and TV ==
- Grushko is a 1994's BBC three part drama series starring Brian Cox and Stephen McGann

== See also ==
- Grushko theorem in mathematics
