= Changan Raeton Plus =

Chinese mid-size sedan

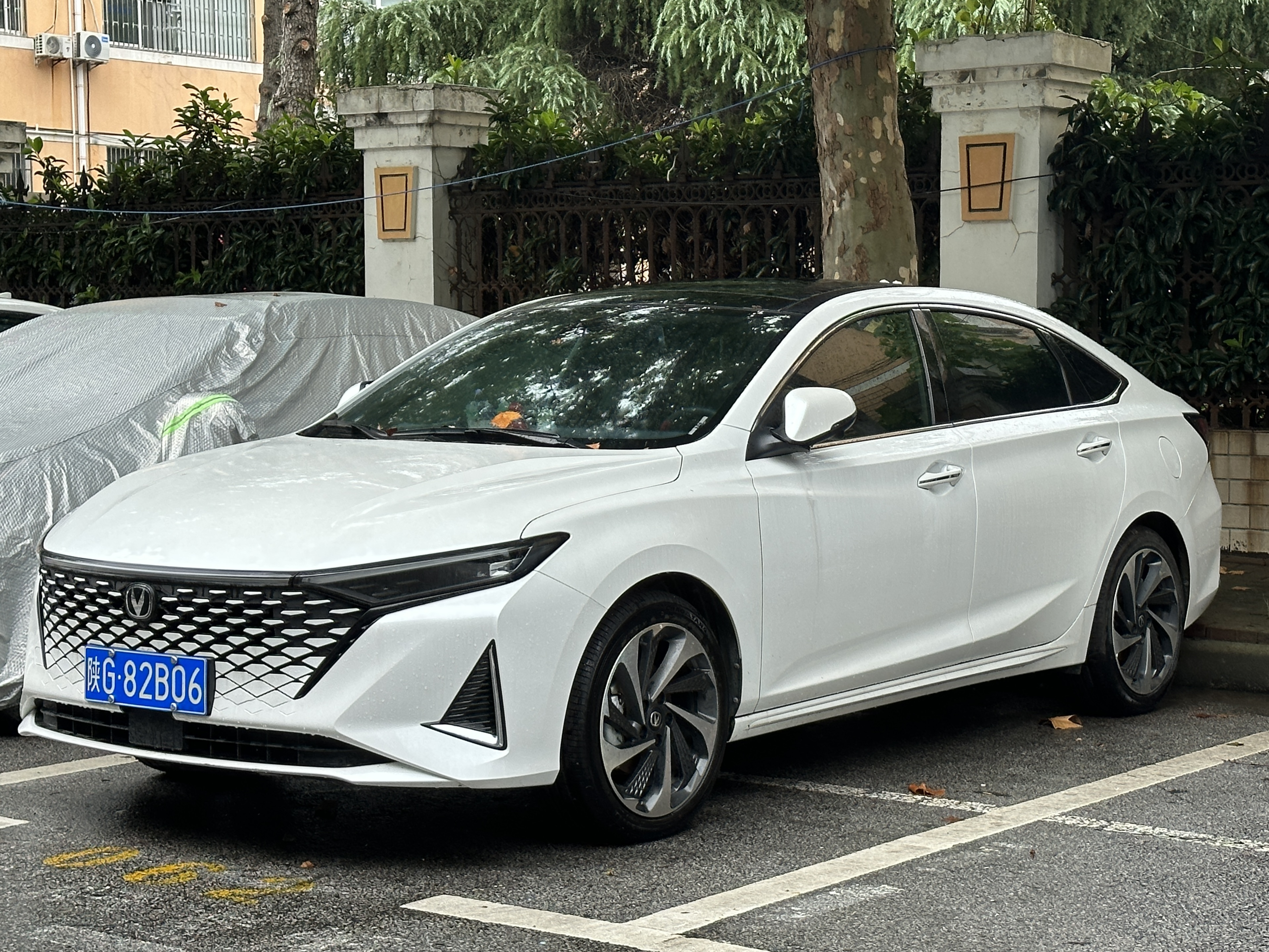
- Changan Raeton Plus

Overview
- Manufacturer: Changan Automobile
- Production: 2017–present

Body and chassis
- Class: Mid-size car
- Body style: 4-door sedan
- Layout: Front-engine, front-wheel-drive

The Changan Raeton Plus (锐程 Plus), and the previous Changan Raeton CC (睿骋 CC), is a mid-size sedan produced by Changan Automobile. Despite using the same name, the Raeton Plus and Raeton CC has no connections with the regular Raeton which is Changan's flagship and largest sedan.

The original production Raeton CC was launched in 2017 being a more fastback and coupe-like variant to the regular Raeton sedan. Within the Chinese domestic market, the Raeton CC is classified as an "A+ segment" which is the slightly larger compact car segment. For the 2020 model year, the Raeton CC received a facelift with the Chinese name completely changed from "睿骋" to "锐程" while still keeping the same pronunciation "Ruicheng". In September 2022, a major update of the fastback sedan was unveiled with a rename to Raeton Plus.

Despite being the other Changan vehicles assembled in Chongqing, the Raeton CC/Plus is assembled at the former Jiangling's Landwind plant in Jiangxi province, along with Changan Nevo (Qiyuan) plug-in hybrid/electric vehicles.

== Changan Raeton CC (First generation) (2017–2022) ==
Changan Raeton CC
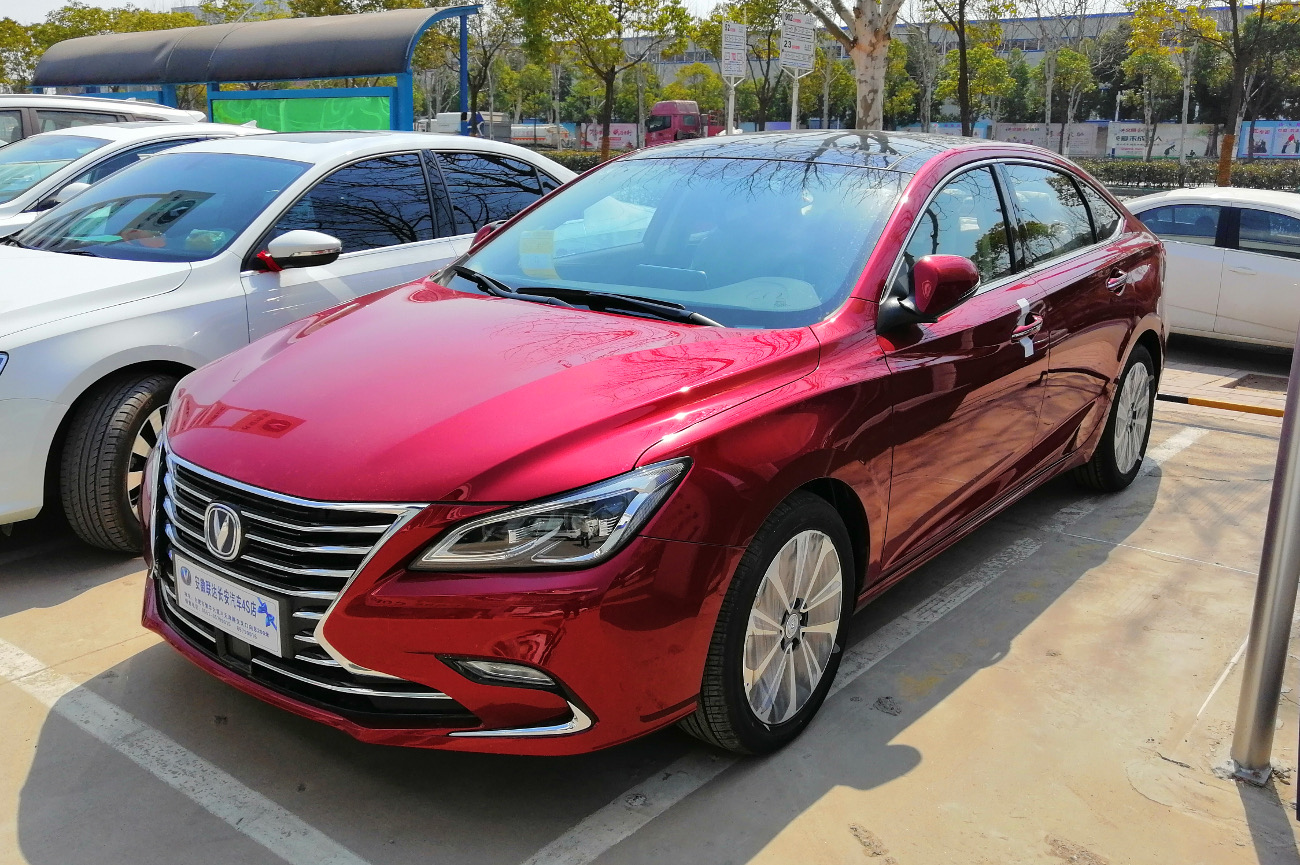

Overview
- Manufacturer: Changan Automobile
- Also called: Khazar CC (Azerbaijan)
- Production: 2017–2022
- Model years: 2018–2022
- Assembly: China: Jiangxi

Body and chassis
- Class: Mid-size car (D)
- Body style: 4-door sedan
- Layout: Front-engine, front-wheel drive
- Platform: P3
- Related: Changan Raeton

Powertrain
- Engine: 1.5 L JL476ZQCD (turbo petrol)
- Transmission: 6-speed manual; 6-speed automatic

Dimensions
- Wheelbase: 2,770 mm (109.1 in)
- Length: 4,780 mm (188.2 in)
- Width: 1,825 mm (71.9 in)
- Height: 1,465 mm (57.7 in)

A concept car named the Changan Raeton CC concept was unveiled on the 2015 Shanghai Auto Show in China, but no visual connections have been made to the production version.

The production Raeton CC rides on a different platform from the regular Raeton and is in fact slightly smaller and will be positioned below the regular Raeton sedan. Price of the CC will start from around 89,900 yuan to around 138,900 yuan.

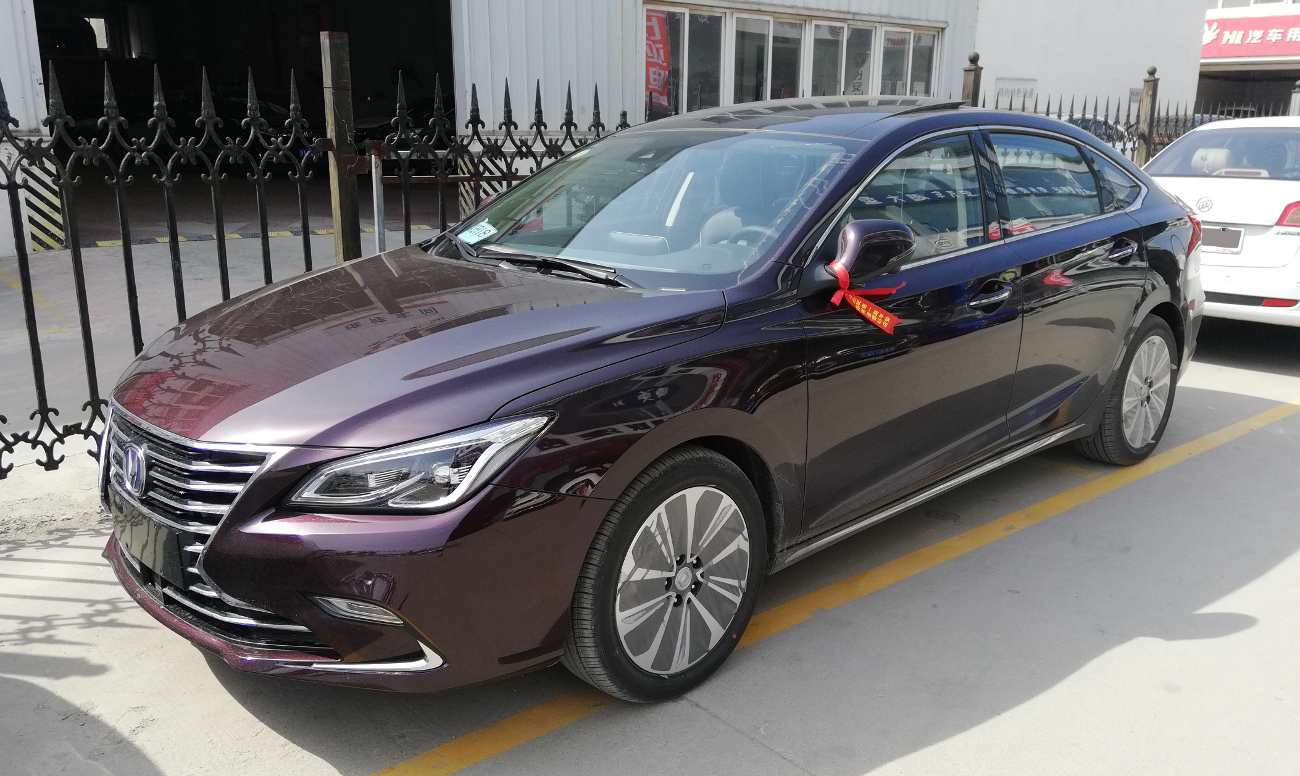
Changan Raeton CC

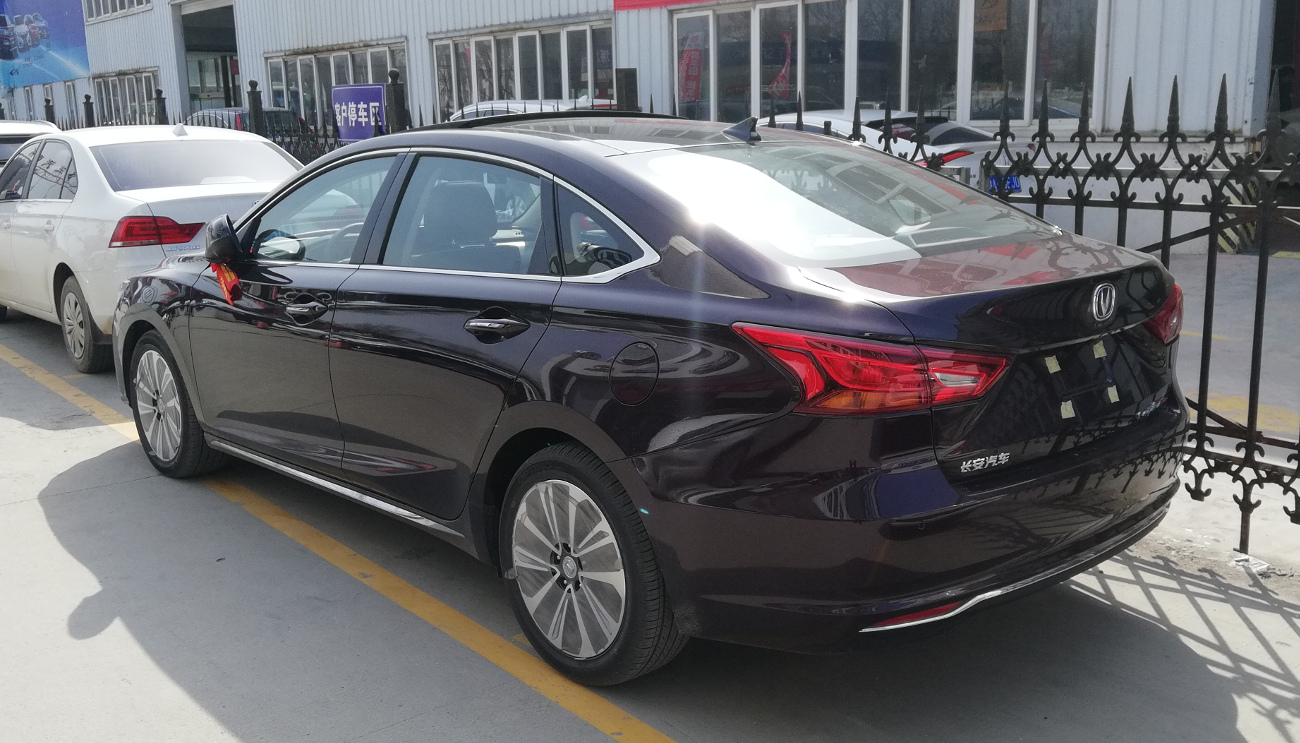
Changan Raeton CC rear

=== Specifications ===
The Raeton CC rides on a Changan-developed platform called the P3, which also underpins a crossover by Changan. Power of the Raeton CC comes from a 1.5 liter turbo engine with 155 hp and 225 Nm, mated to a six-speed manual transmission or a six-speed automatic transmission. In terms of chassis, the Raeton CC features front MacPherson-type independent suspension plus rear multi-link independent suspension.

=== 2020 facelift ===
On October 18, 2019, the 2020 model year of the Changan Raeton CC was officially launched. The updated model has a new Chinese name pronounced as Ruicheng CC (锐程 CC). The 2020 Raeton CC facelift launched a total of five trim levels with a price range of 94,900 to 128,900 yuan (~US$13,410 to US$18,214). The update features a revised front end and the length of the refreshed car has increased by 20mm while the powertrain remains unchanged.

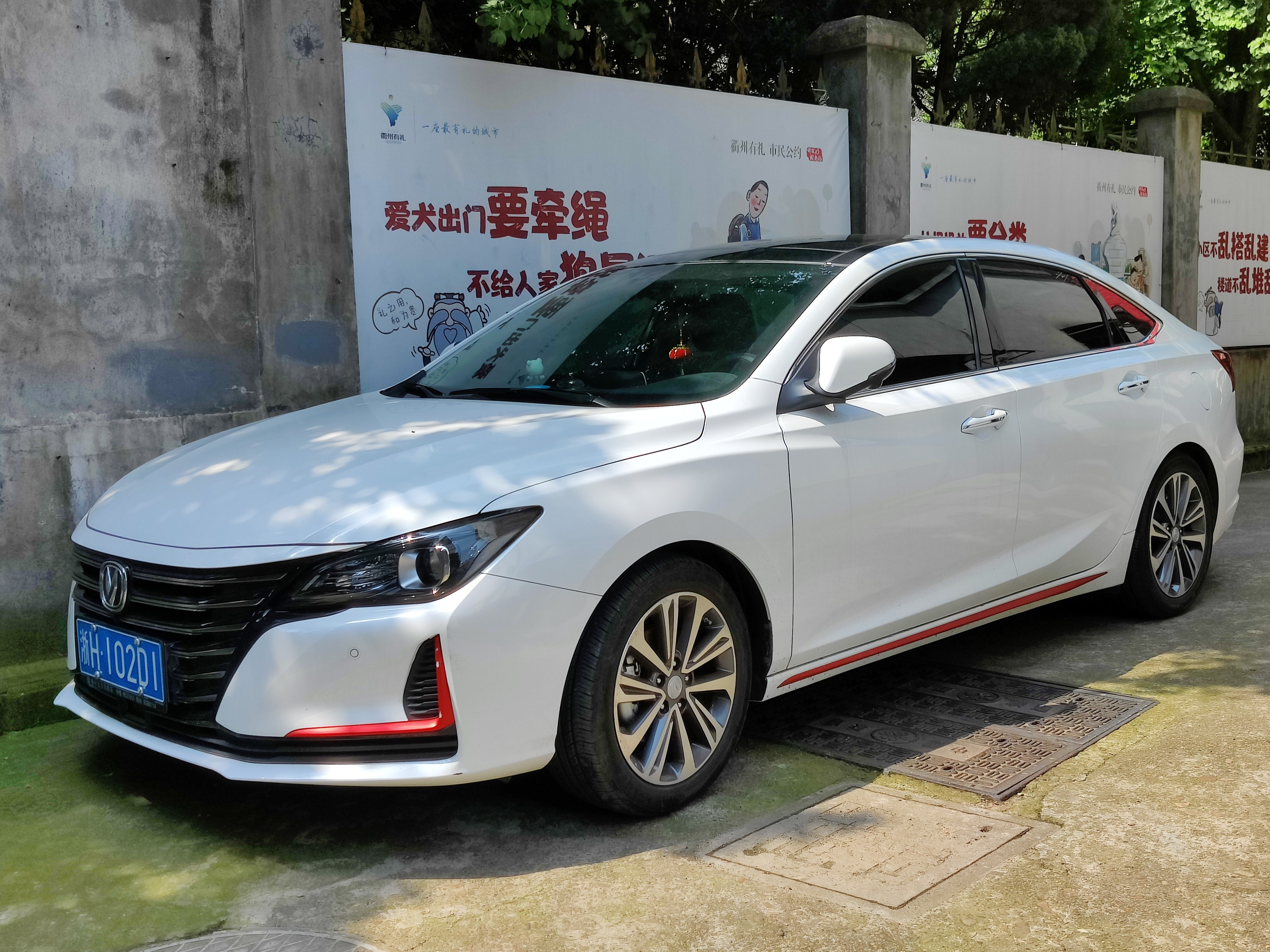
Front view of the Changan Raeton CC 2020 facelift.

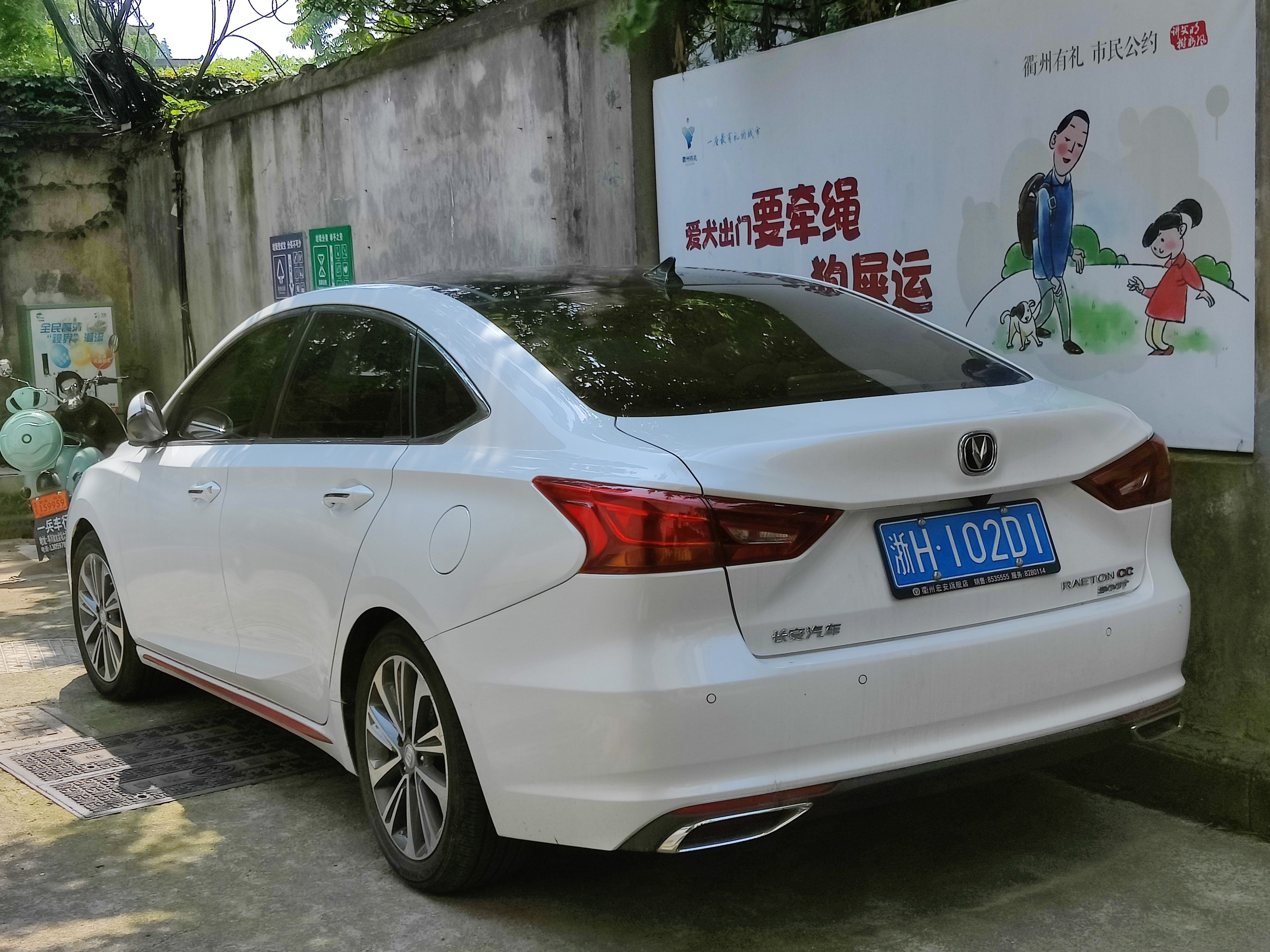
Rear view of the Changan Raeton CC 2020 facelift.

== Changan Raeton Plus (Second generation) (2023–present) ==
Changan Raeton Plus
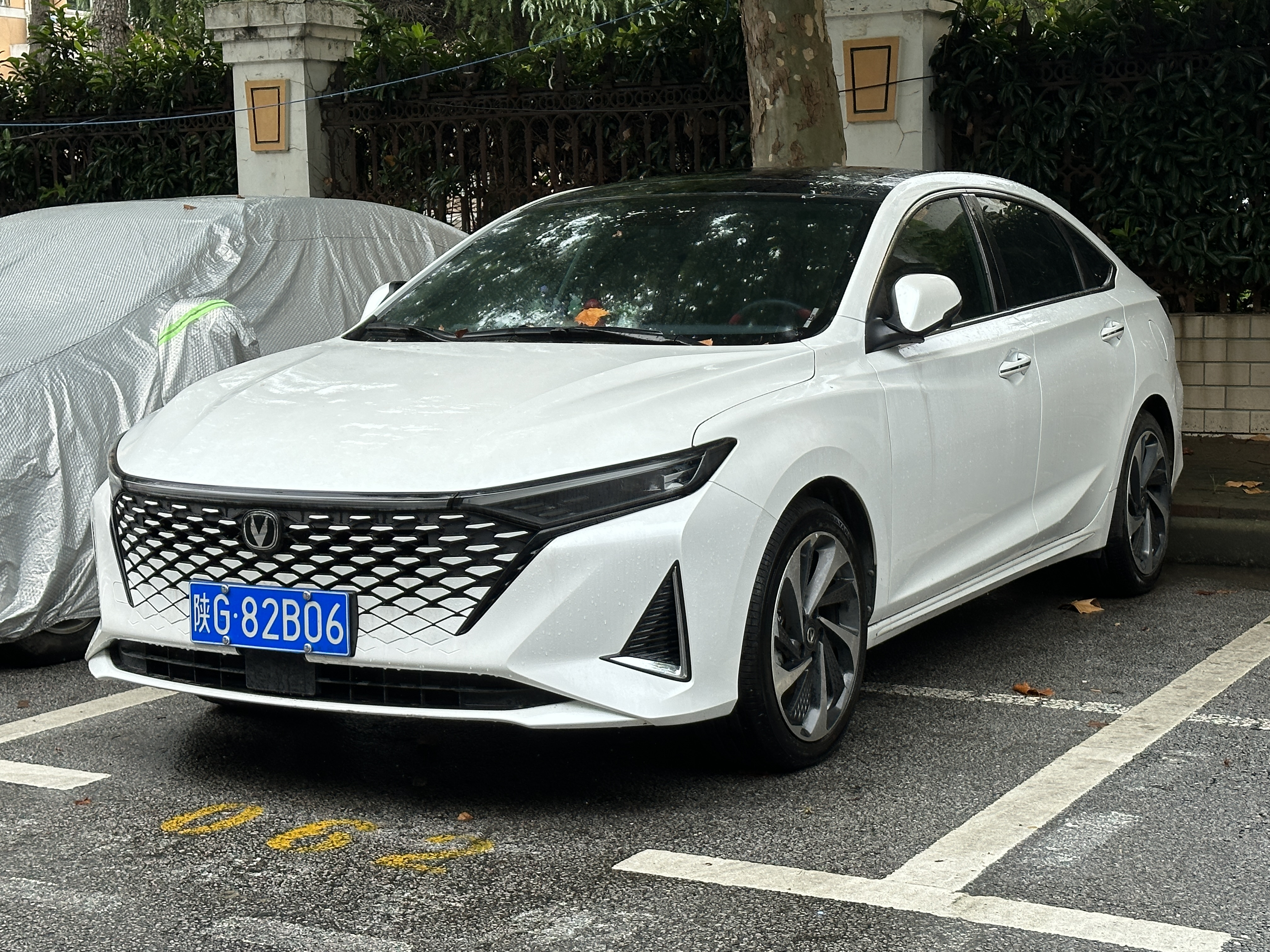

Overview
- Manufacturer: Changan Automobile
- Also called: Volga C40 (Russia)
- Production: 2022–present
- Model years: 2023–present
- Assembly: China: Jiangxi; Russia: Nizhny Novgorod

Body and chassis
- Class: Mid-size car (D)
- Body style: 4-door sedan
- Layout: Front-engine, front-wheel drive
- Platform: P3
- Related: Changan Raeton

Powertrain
- Engine: 1.5 L JL476ZQCD (turbo petrol)
- Transmission: 7-speed DCT

Dimensions
- Wheelbase: 2,770 mm (109.1 in)
- Length: 4,800 mm (189.0 in)
- Width: 1,820 mm (71.7 in)
- Height: 1,480 mm (58.3 in)

The Raeton Plus (锐程 Plus) was unveiled during the 2022 Chengdu Auto Show as a major update of the Raeton CC. The interior features facial recognition system and can automatically adjust the seat position, light and other equipment upon recognizing the driver. Driver fatigue monitoring system, 360 degree driving recorder, adaptive cruise control, panoramic camera and wireless mobile charging are also available on the Raeton Plus.

=== Specifications ===
The Raeton Plus still rides on the Changan-developed P3 platform and is powered by a 1.5-litre turbocharged engine that produces 188 hp of power and 300 Nm of torque. The engine is paired with a 7-speed dual-clutch gearbox. The fuel consumption of the Raeton Plus is rated at 6.44 liters per 100 kilometers (15.52 km per liter).

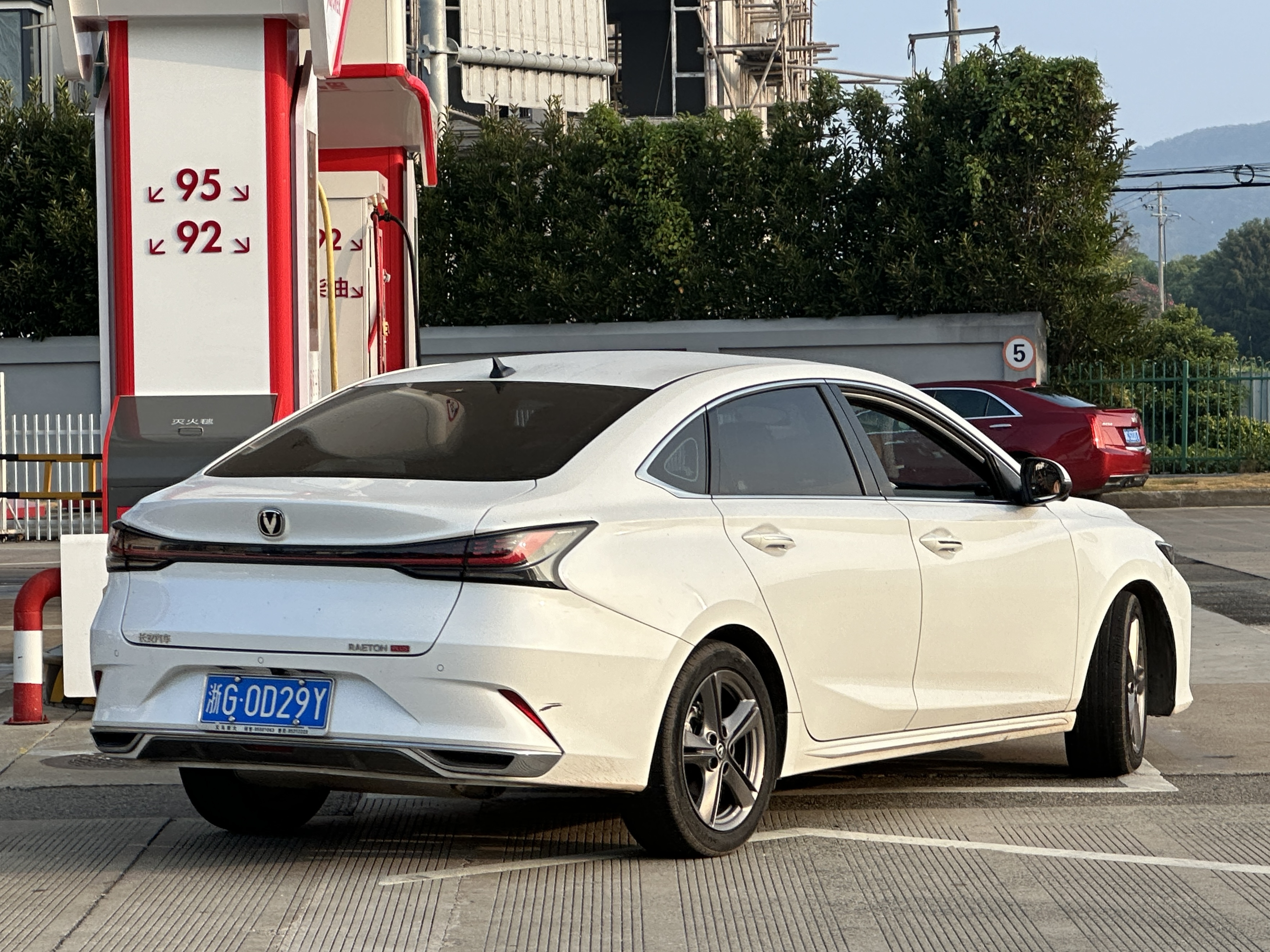
Changan Raeton Plus rear

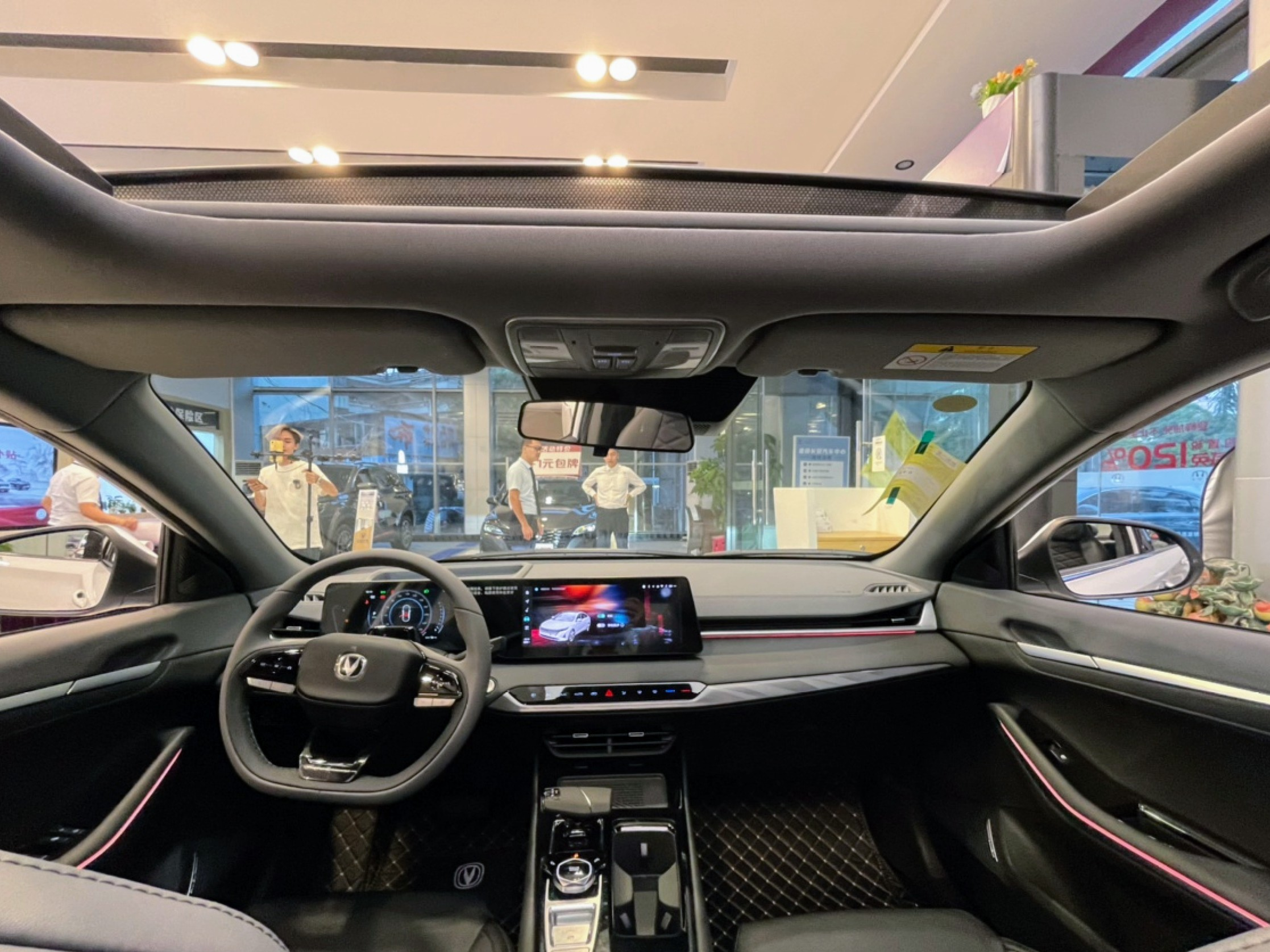
Changan Raeton Plus interior

=== Volga C40 ===
In December 2023, the Russian authorities confirmed that the local automotive company GAZ was in talks with a Chinese company to restore another historic car brand at the time - this time the Volga. A month later, plans to launch the first range of cars of the new Volga for mid-2024 were confirmed, initially speculating that the Hongqi brand designs of the Chinese company FAW Group would be the basis. In March 2024, it was confirmed that another Chinese company, Changan Automobile, would become a technological partner, which had already handed over the first batch for testing in Nizhny Novgorod. Finally, the premiere of the new Volga took place in the second half of 2024, presenting three cars based on Changan products: the C40 sedan and the K30 and K40 SUVs. A new company has been established for local Russian car production, with the descriptive name Proizvodstvo Legkovych Awtomobilej, assuming that it will reach full capacity in 2025. In September 2025, the start of production was postponed to the spring of 2026. Eventually, the production did not come into fruition.

The Volga C40 is a redesigned Changan Raeton Plus for the Russian market and one of the models presented on May 21, 2024. The Volga is powered by a 1.5-liter turbocharged engine with 188 hp and 300 Nm of torque, which is mated to a seven-speed dual-clutch transmission. Fuel consumption is 6.44 liters per 100 km. It is intended to revive the old Volga brand, which was used by GAZ for its executive cars from the 1950s to 2010. It was lastly used in 2010 by the Volga Siber. Despite its slightly smaller dimensions and much more economical engines, at least compared to the GAZ-31105 Volga, the C40 retains some stylistic cues from the original Volgas, such as receiving a new grille inspired by the GAZ-21 Volga.

== Sales ==
Year	China			Total production
Year	Raeton CC	Raeton Plus	Total	Total production
2021				26,772
2022				19,131
2023	10,279	9,703	19,982	15,286
2024	3,464	3,164	6,628	6,403
2025	2,339	—	2,339	125
