= GAZ Volga =

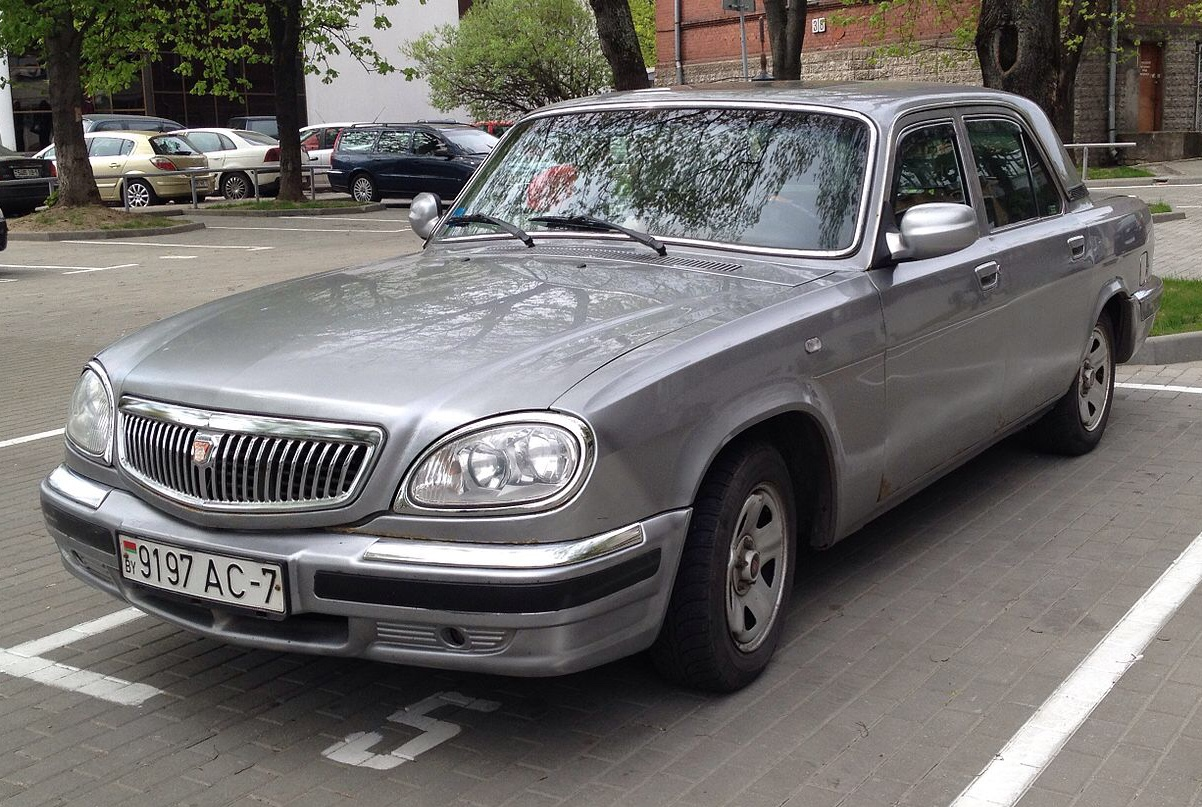
GAZ-31105 Volga (2004-2009)

The Volga (Russian: Волга) is an executive car that originated in the Soviet Union to replace the GAZ Pobeda in 1956. Their role in serving the Soviet nomenklatura made them a contemporary cultural icon. Several generations of the car have been produced.

Despite the continuous modernisations, GAZ found it increasingly difficult to keep the ageing design competitive in a market economy. GAZ's then-CEO Bo Andersson decided to discontinue the Volga range in 2010.

Following Russian invasion of Ukraine in 2022 with western car brands leaving Russia Volga was reintroduced in 2024 as a brand for Chinese cars locally assembled by GAZ-owned Passenger Cars Production company.

== First generation, the GAZ-M-21 ==
GAZ-21 Volga
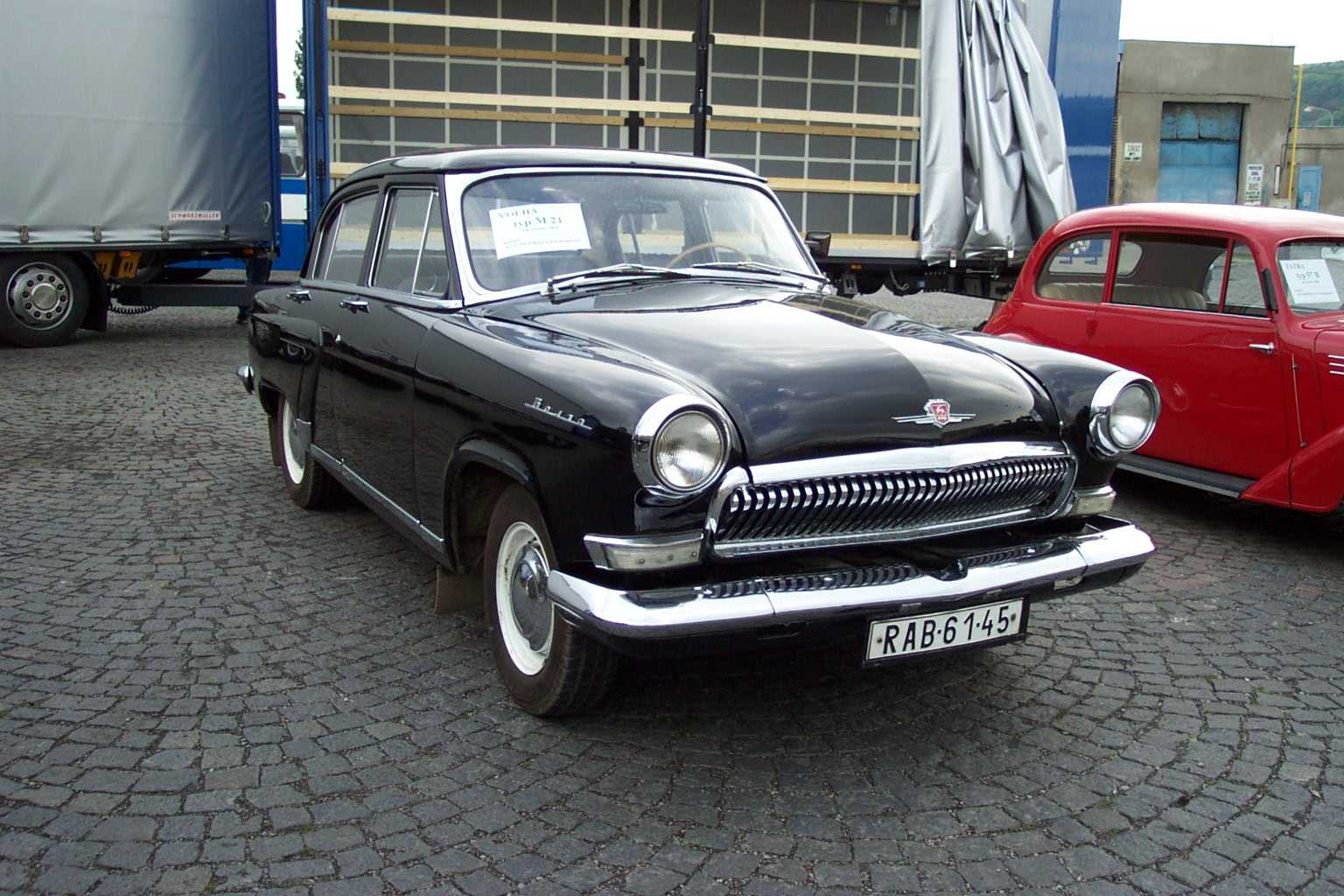

Overview
- Production: 1956–1958 (first series); 1958–1962 (second series); 1962–1970 (third series)
- Assembly: Soviet Union: Gorky; Belgium: Antwerp (Sobimpex N.V.)
- Designer: Lev Yeremeev

Body and chassis
- Body style: 4-door saloon/sedan 5-door estate/wagon (GAZ-22)
- Related: GAZ-22, GAZ-23

Powertrain
- Engine: 2,445 cc ZMZ-21A I4; 5.52 L V8

Chronology
- Predecessor: GAZ-M20 Pobeda

The first generation Volga was developed as a replacement for the 1946 GAZ-M20 Pobeda mid-size car, based on a brief issued in 1951. The first pre-production batch left GAZ on 10 October 1956. It was built in three distinct series; in total 639,478 Volgas were built from 1956 until 1970. There was also a custom-assembled estate derivative (GAZ-22) introduced in 1962 and a rare, V8-engined version developed for the KGB's 9th Directorate as an escort vehicle for motorcades.

The first series, nicknamed the Star, was built from late 1956 until 1958. It was replaced by the second series, fitted with a 16-slit grille and nicknamed Akula (Shark). There were also continuous improvements throughout the entire production run. In 1962, the third series with its characteristic 36-slit grille was introduced. The new grille prompted the "Baleen" (Kitovy Us) nickname and became a Volga trademark for decades. Originally called the GAZ-M-21, the -M- prefix was a reference to Vyacheslav Molotov, after whom the Volga plant was named. The plant was renamed following the downfall of his career in 1957, and the -M- prefix was gradually removed from the car beginning in 1965. A fourth series was rejected and production of the third and final GAZ-21 continued until 15 July 1970.

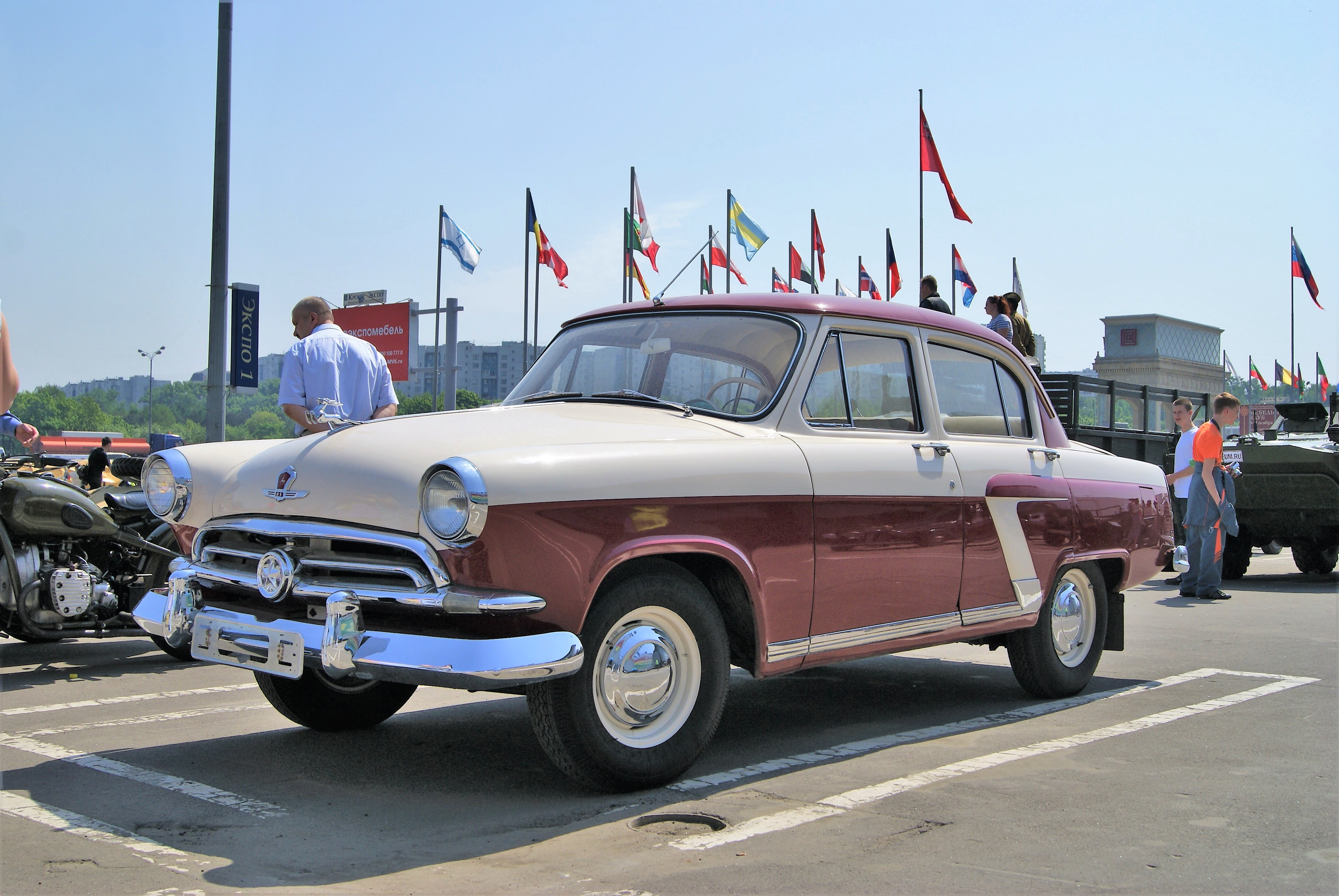
The first generation cars featured a characteristic grille with a star emblem which gave the car its nickname. It proved time-consuming to manufacture and deterred potential foreign customers, thus lasting less than two years on the assembly line

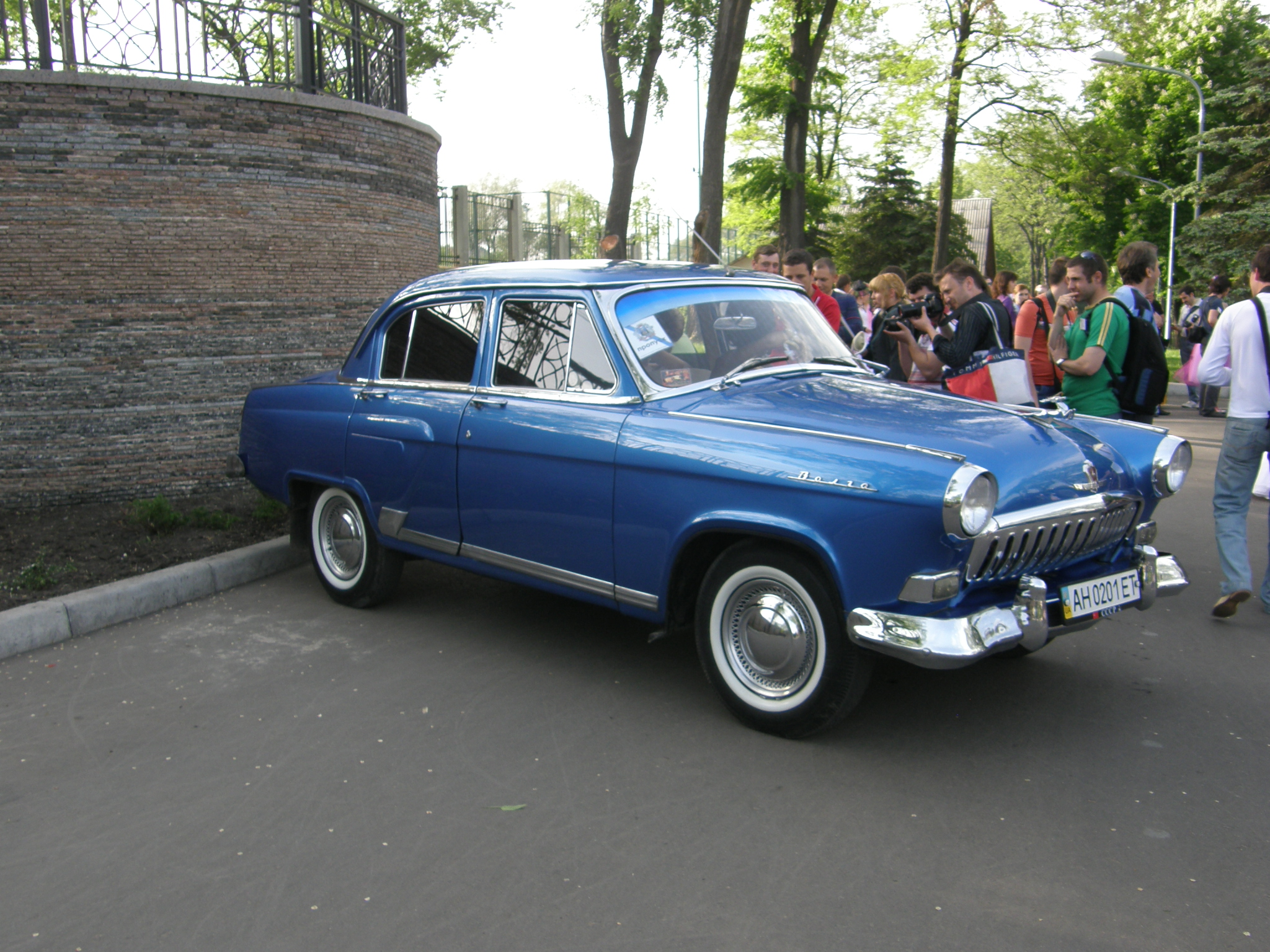
The second generation, the "Shark".

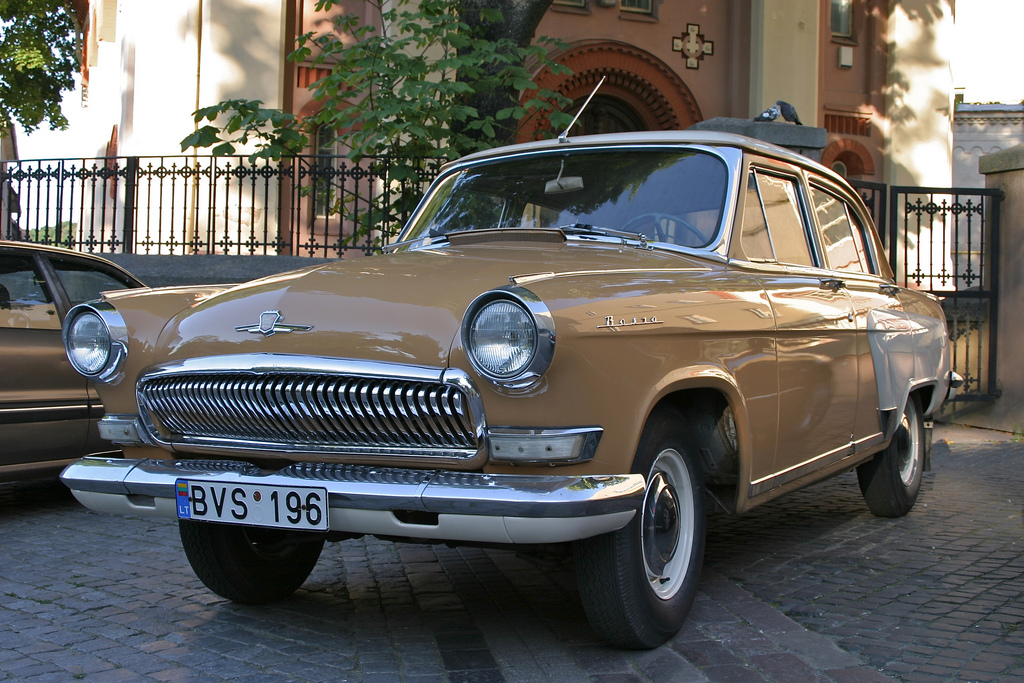
A GAZ-M-21U of the Third Series, showing the "Baleen" type grille would become a factory trademark element for all successive cars.

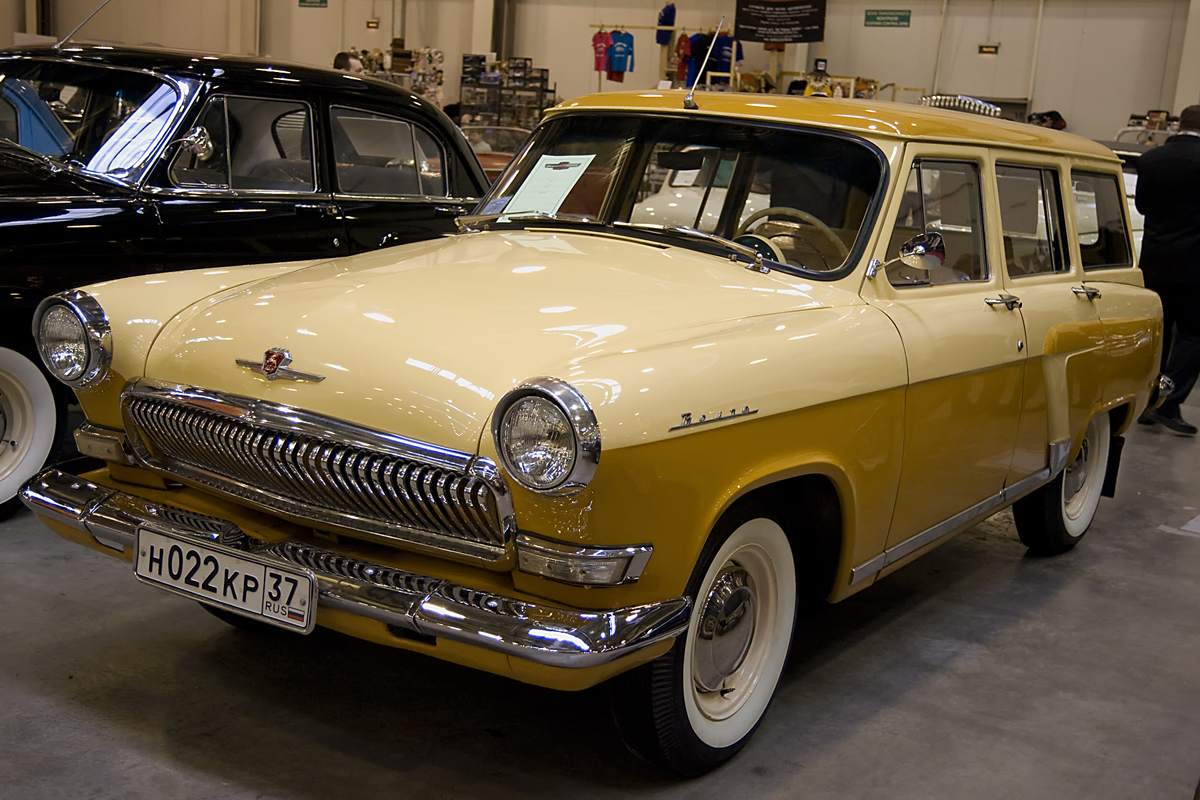
Due to private ownership of GAZ-22 station wagon/estate being forbidden in the Soviet Union, few survive

== Second generation, the GAZ-24, GAZ-3102 and GAZ-3110 ==
Development of the planned replacement for the GAZ-21 Volga began in 1961. The GAZ-24 Volga was planned to have 7-10 year lifetime, lasting through the 1970s. However, even before its 1968 première, it was already behind schedule and as the USSR slipped into the Era of Stagnation, following Alexey Kosygin's 1965 Soviet economic reform, the car was to become an iconic feature of that era, both aesthetically and technically. Developed in the mid-1960s it would undergo a series of modernisations and facelifts, and despite unsuccessful attempts to find a replacement (GAZ-3105, GAZ-3111 and the Siber), the car would only be retired in 2009 - 40 years after the first series began production.

=== First series — the GAZ-24 (1970–1985) ===
Concept sketches of the GAZ-21's replacement developed a more angular and rigid profile. GAZ planned to keep a modernised version of the four-cylinder engine and manual transmission in the base model, but a prototype also appeared with a 120 PS (88 kW; 118 hp) 2,990 cc (182 cu in) V6 engine. The first prototypes were built in 1966, and a year later the car was certified for production. For economic reasons the V6 model, despite showing promising results, was deemed unfeasible for mass production. The first batch of 24 vehicles were assembled in 1968 but it took until 15 July 1970 for the car to finally supersede the GAZ-21 on the conveyor belt.

Despite its more imposing appearance, the GAZ-24 was in fact 75 mm (3.0 in) shorter in length and 120 mm (4.7 in) in height, yet its wheelbase was extended by 10 mm (0.39 in). The car was built in several modifications and these were now indicated by numbers rather than letters. Though the vehicle never underwent a generational facelift on the scale of the GAZ-21, nonetheless the car was modernised with continuous technical improvements during production. In the original design brief, the GAZ-24 was to be retired by 1978, but GAZ was forced to update it instead. After a light refresh in 1977, the GAZ-24-10 appeared in 1985, receiving many of the features developed for the GAZ-3102, the 24's intended successor. Including the GAZ-24-10, almost one and a half million such Volgas were produced until 1992. The lion's share of cars were used for the Soviet nomenklatura and the rest mainly in taxi, police and ambulances.

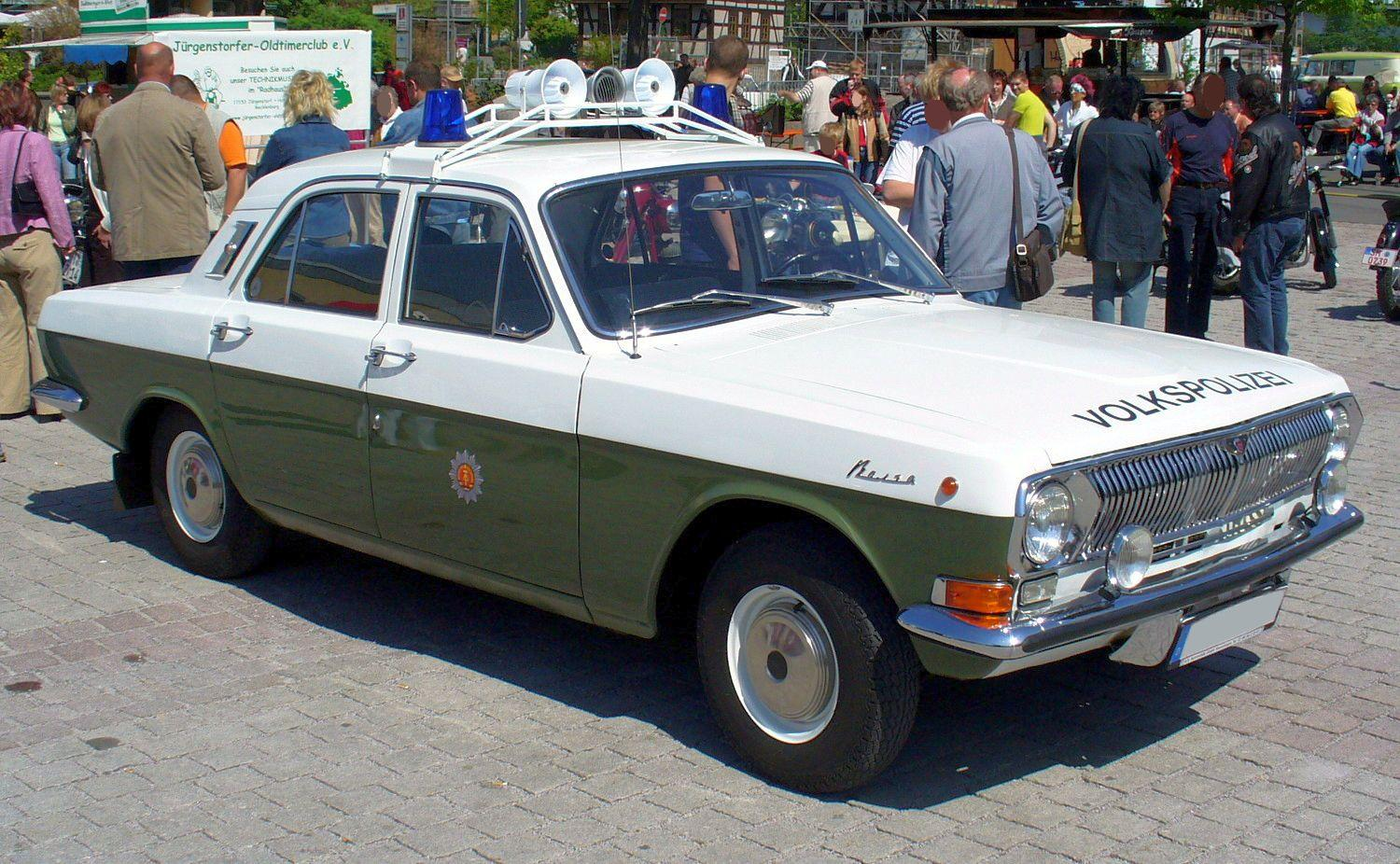
Volkspolizei GAZ-24

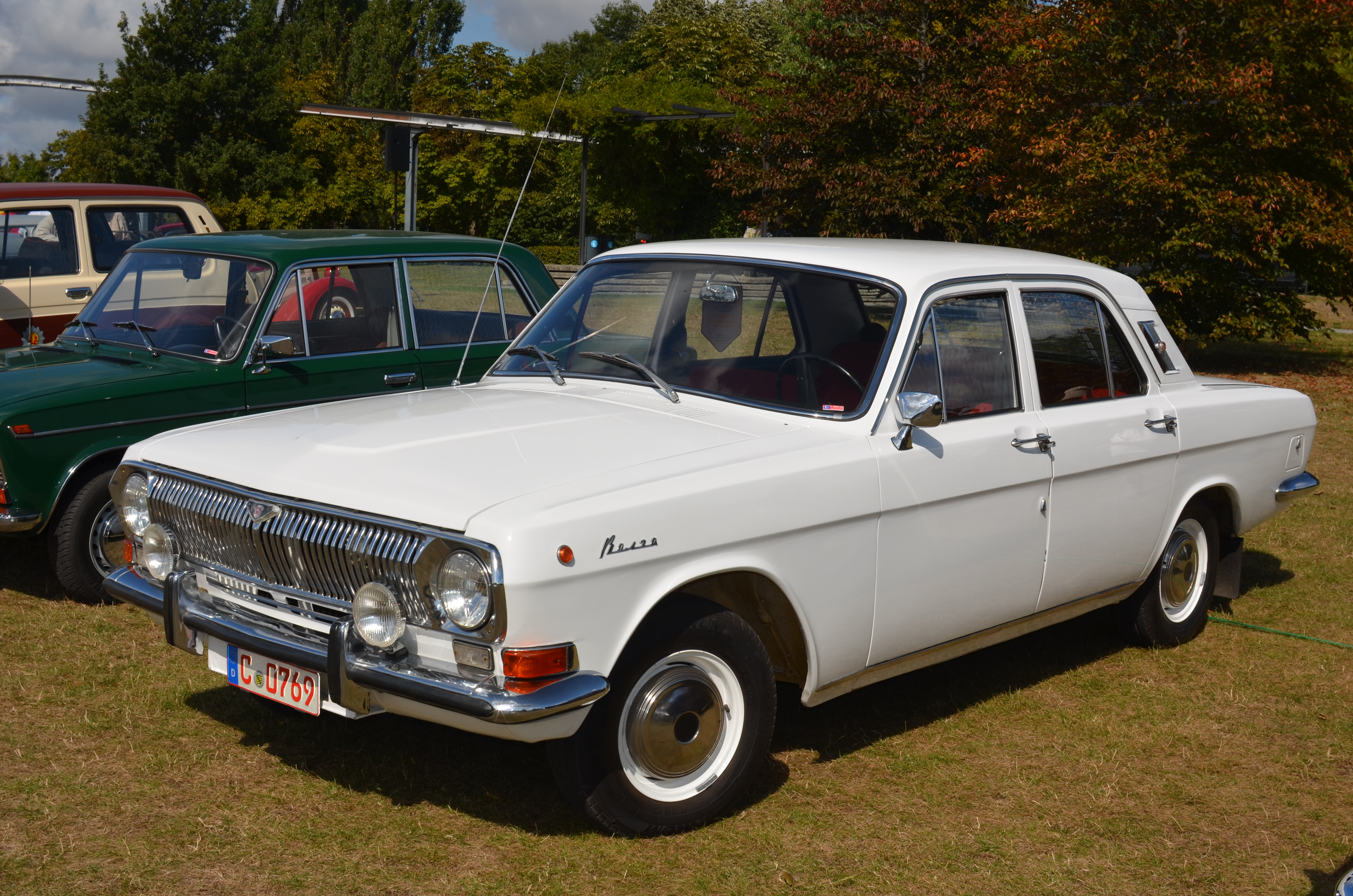
GAZ-24 sedan

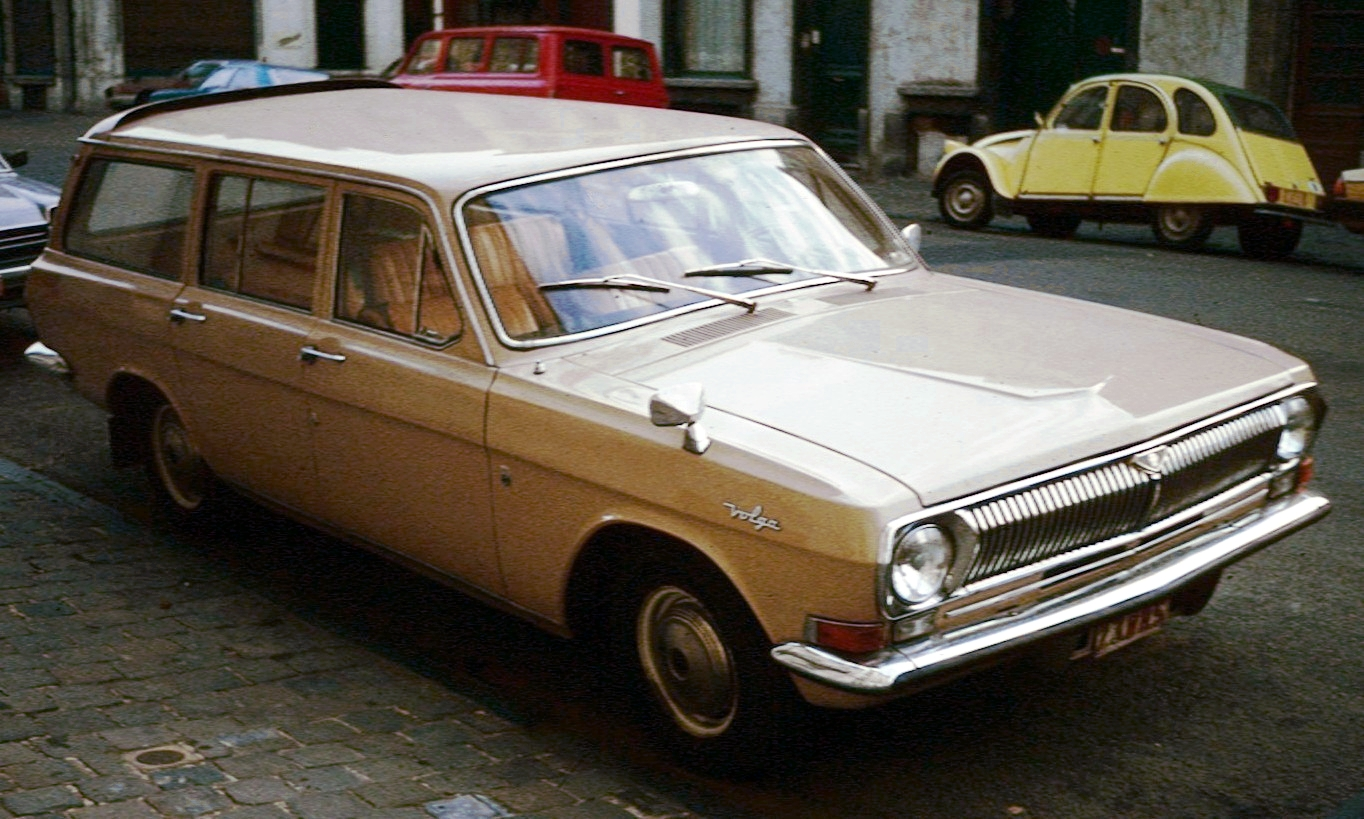
GAZ-24 estate

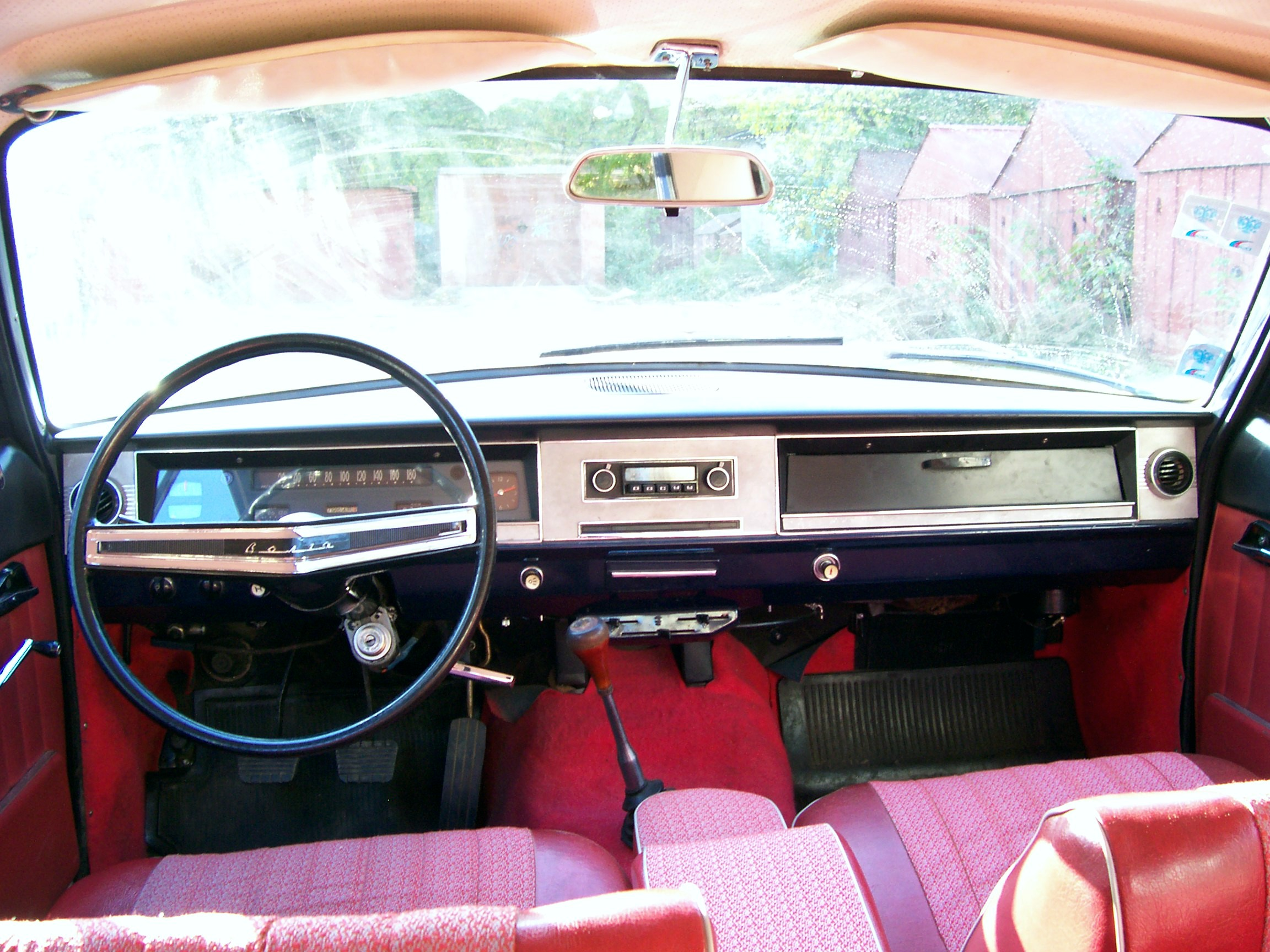
Interior of a 1974 model

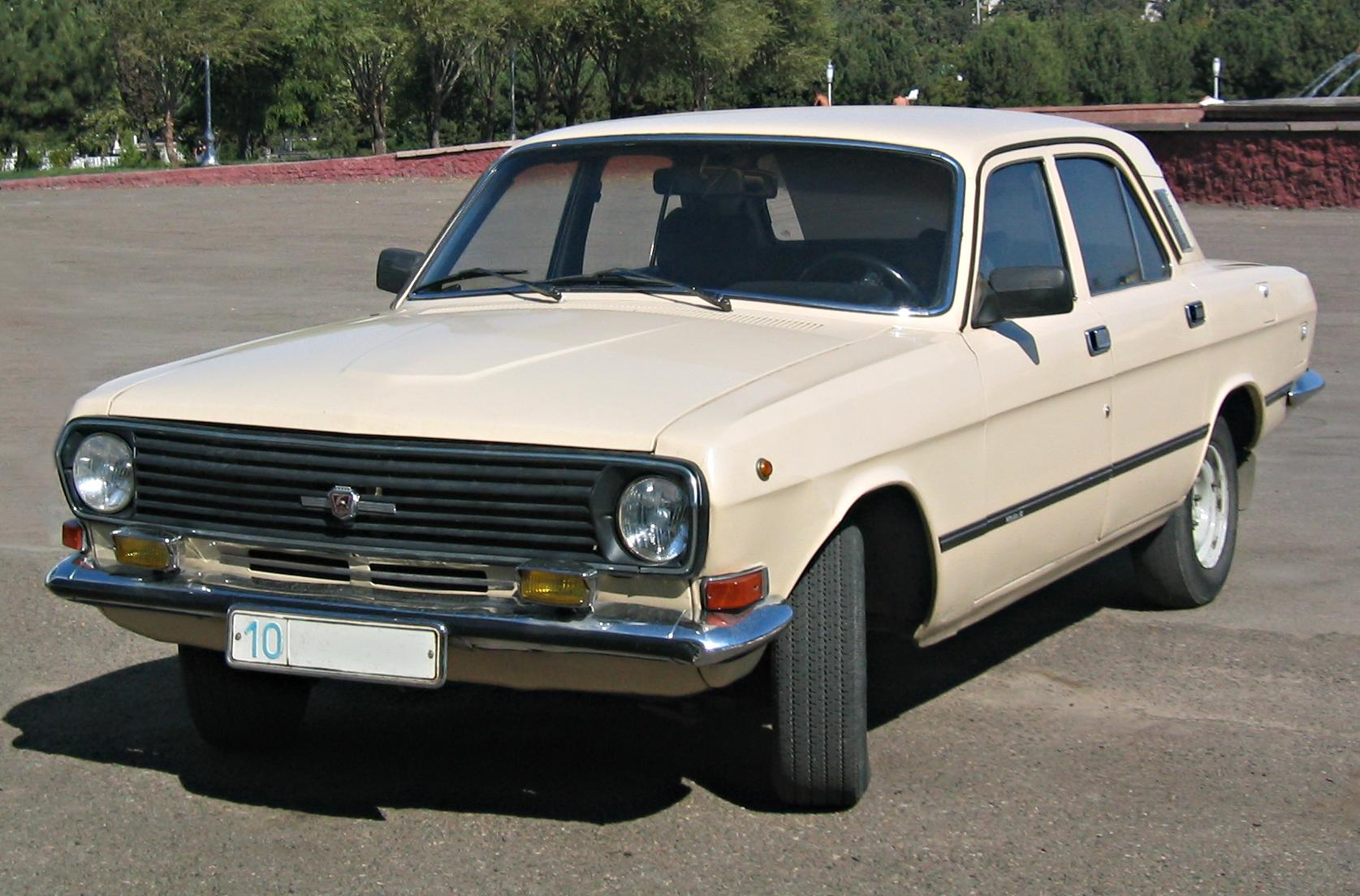
GAZ-24-10

=== Second series—the GAZ-3102 and derivatives ===
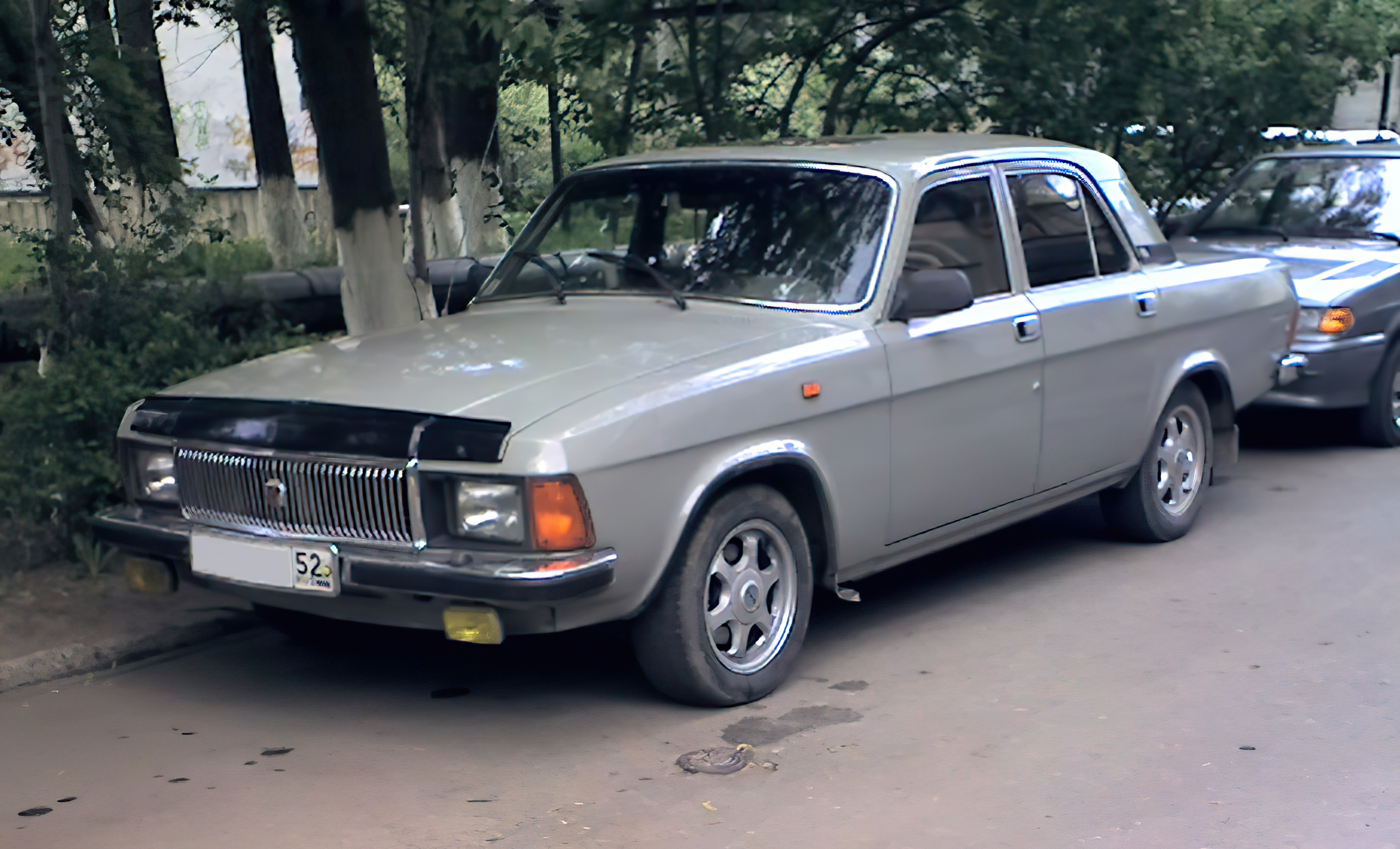
GAZ-3102, mid-1990s

Manufacture of the 3102 began in 1981, with its official launch the next year. However, such car would never see light, as the 1970s unrolled, the stagnation era effects has significantly thwarted any innovation in Soviet Union's planned economy structure. Moreover, the Minister of Automotive Industry, Viktor Polyakov, had open favouritism for the new VAZ giant, and thus neither AZLK's 3-5 project, nor GAZ's ambitious third-generation Volga would see their respective conveyors. In 1973 more economic solution was adopted for the future car, that rotated around giving a major upgrade to the GAZ-24 by replacing most of the mechanics, the body panels, the interior yet keeping the skeletal body sections and platform, thus avoiding the most costly replacement of production press stamping.

The first users of the 3102 were the KGB and other government bodies through 1983. It proved unavailable to the public until after the collapse of the Soviet Union. This limited availability has given the 3102 a particular cachet in Russia (even over the Mercedes common among the privileged), allowing GAZ sell it at a markup.

==== GAZ-3102 (1982–2009) ====
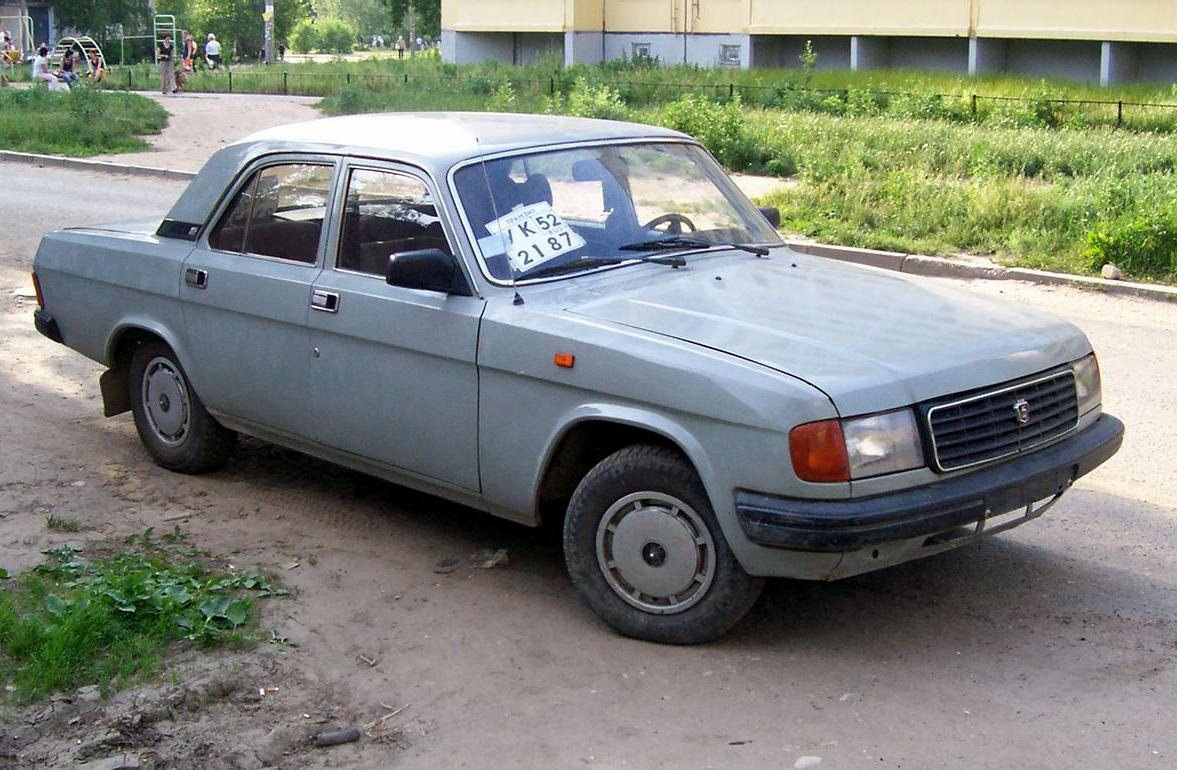
GAZ-31029

By 1980 a replacement was developed, the GAZ-3102, which was based on the central platform and body of the GAZ-24, but with original fascia, interior, engine and chassis. However, political and economic stagnation of the late Brezhnev years continuously delayed the car's launch. From 1982 and all the way until 2008, the GAZ-3102 was produced in parallel with other Volgas, though in lesser quantities. Originally having its own production line and many distinct features, by 1997 the differences between production, trim and accessories of GAZ-3102 and latter Volga's were external only. Having originally been an exclusive car for higher ranking authorities, it retained such an image during the 1990s and well into the 2000s. In 1992, when the original machine tooling for the GAZ-24 body panels disintegrated, GAZ used the bodypanels of the GAZ-3102 on the somewhat obsolete but lower-cost GAZ-24 underpinnings. Production of the resulting GAZ-31029 doubled in quantity and halved in quality, transforming the car from a symbol of status into a disposable workhorse.

=== Third series—the GAZ-3110 and 31105 ===
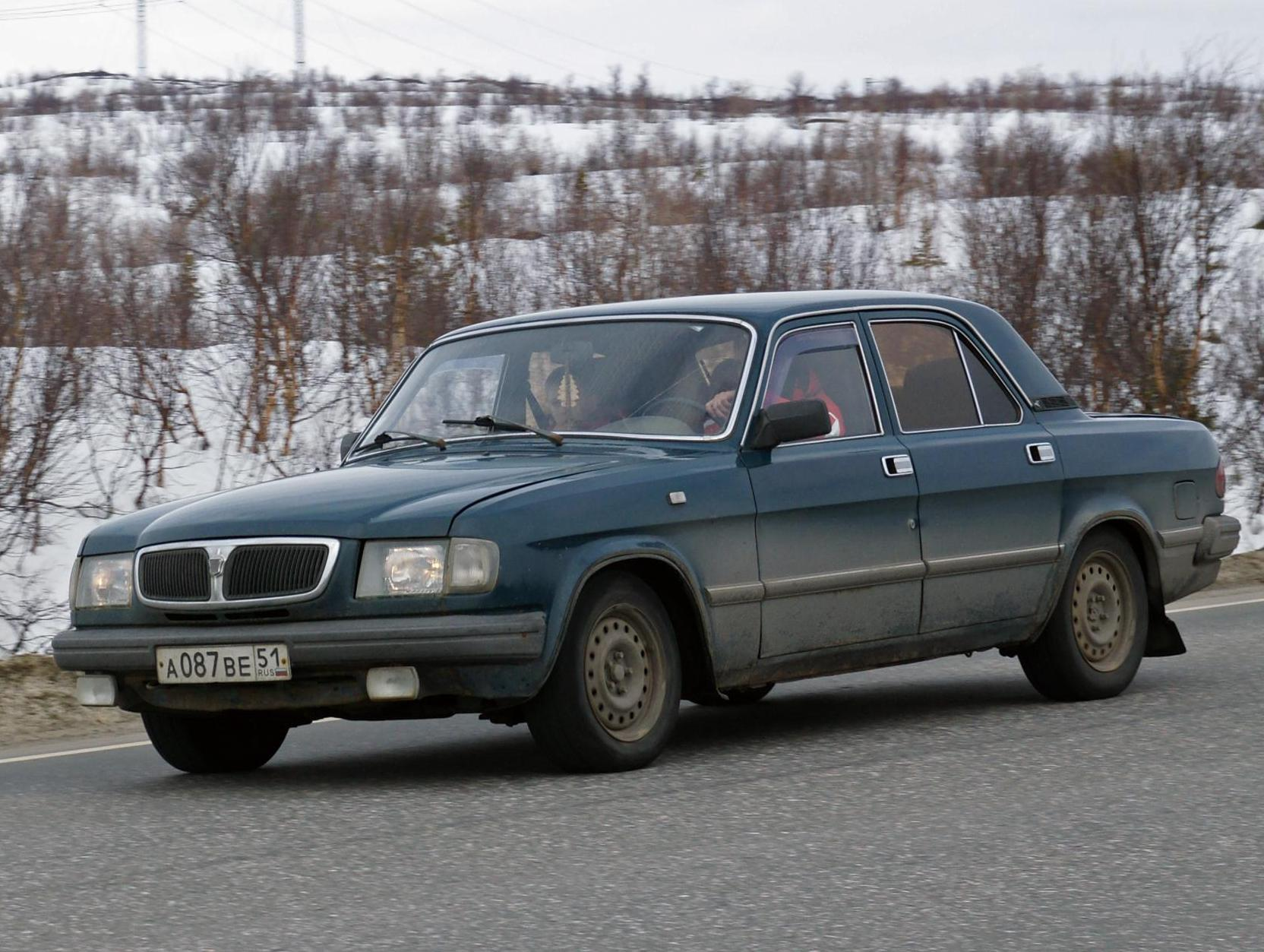
GAZ-3110 (1997–2004)

==== GAZ-3110 (1997–2004) ====
Though deemed temporary until GAZ's own LCV cars, the GAZelle and Sobol, entered production, the GAZ-31029 Volga occupied a major market niche, and demand for the vehicle remained. Thus in 1997 GAZ modernised the car once more, creating original body panels, whilst retaining the GAZ-24's central shell. This removed the visual dissonance that the 31029 created, and by incorporating the chassis and powertrain developed for the new Gazelle families (which in turn were designed for the aborted GAZ-3103/04/05 Volgas), combined with a new interior resulted in GAZ-3110 model. Given the timing, with the 1998 financial crisis that followed, which left many foreign equivalents outside the budget Russia's business and public alike, the GAZ-3110 proved a necessity rather than a cheap alternative during the post-crisis years.

==== GAZ-31105 (2004–2009) ====
GAZ-31105 was a second stage of the GAZ-3110's modernisation, though the designation was applied to cars produced from January 2004, the mechanical features were introduced almost a year earlier, and certain external ones were available in separate batches as standard or optional in others. In 2006 a long-wheelbase GAZ-31055 luxury model was introduced, the cars also began to be fitted with Chrysler engines. In 2007 the model received a minor facelift and a Euro III ZMZ engine. In 2009 after a forty-year run the second generation of Volga retired.

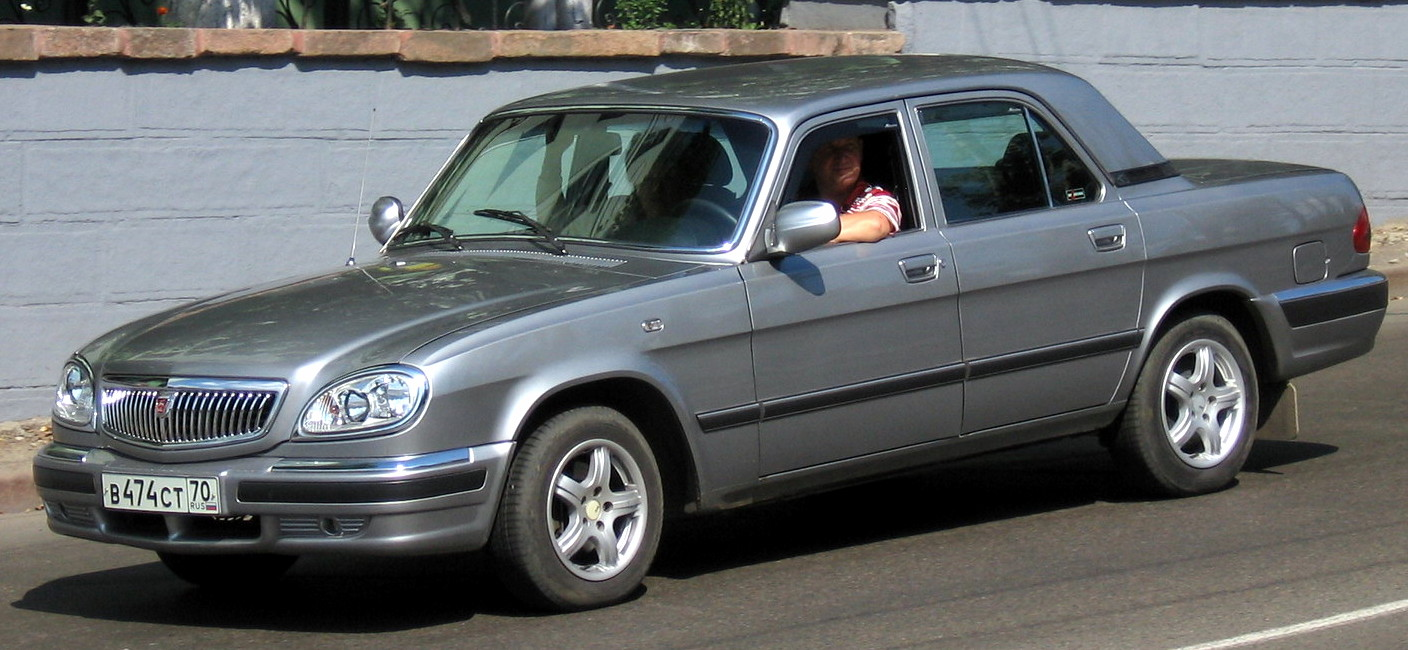
GAZ-31105 in Tomsk

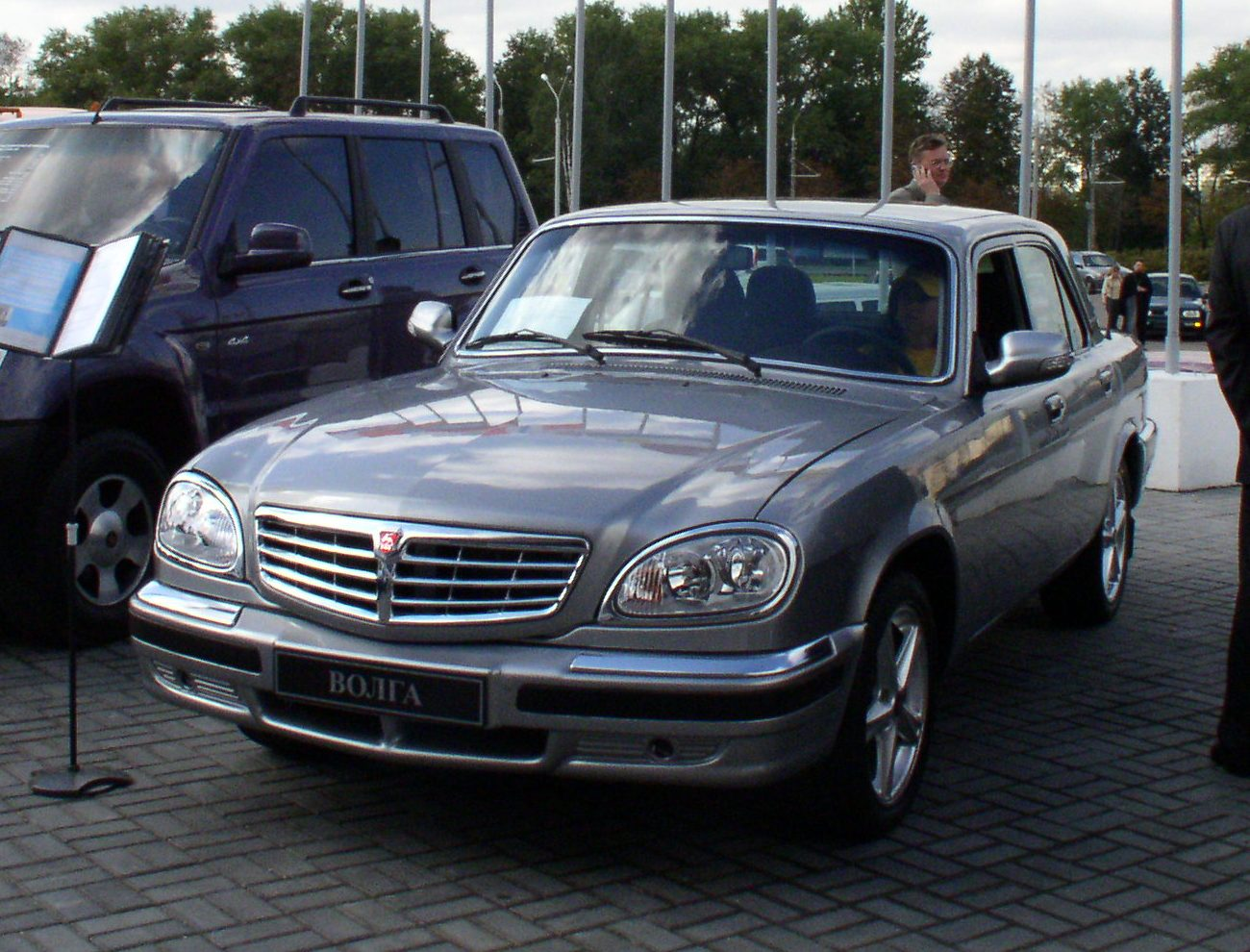
GAZ-31105 (2007 facelift)

== Limited production models ==
=== GAZ-3105 Volga (1992–1996) ===
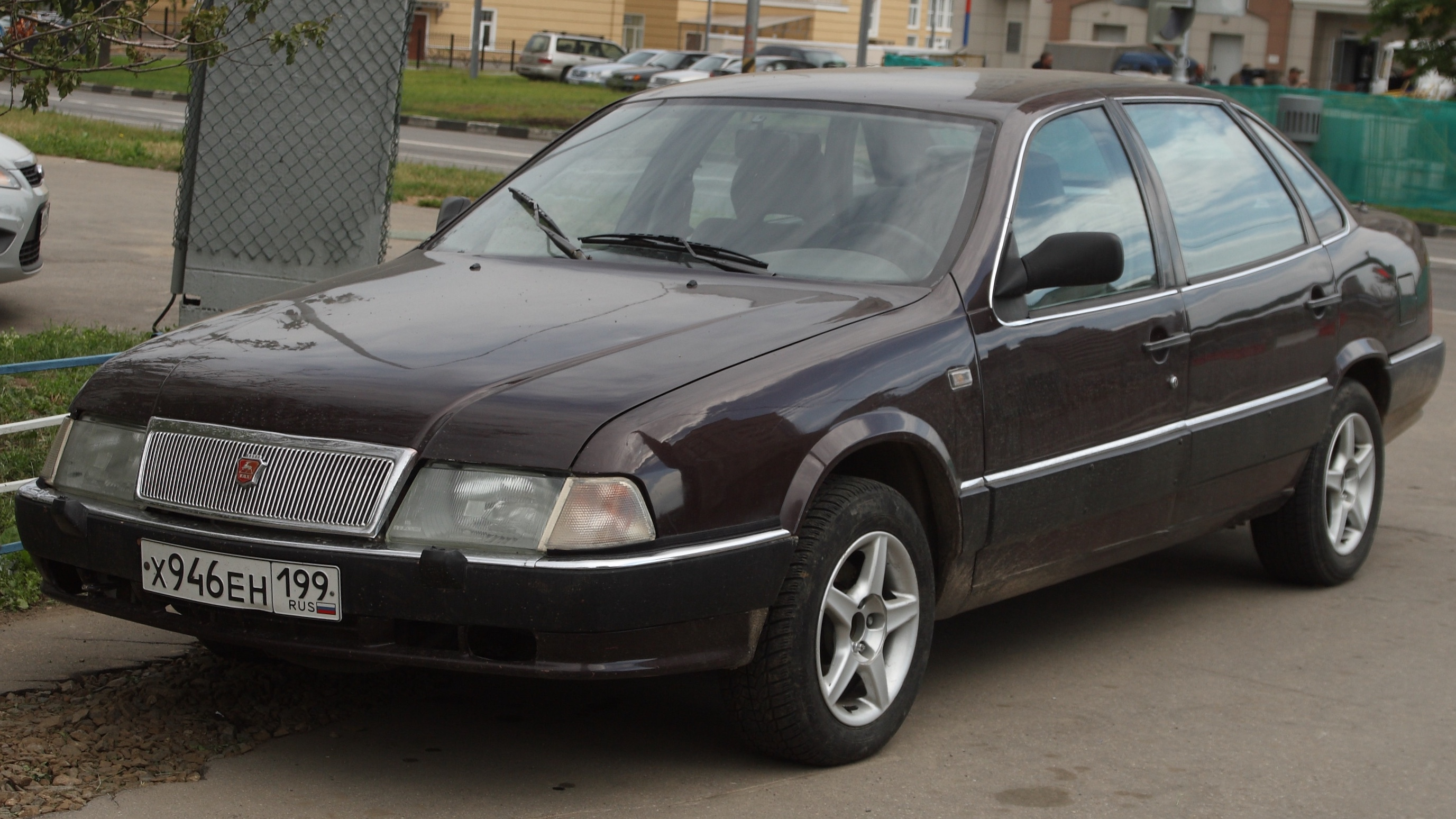
GAZ-3105 Volga (1992–1996)

During the late 1980s GAZ developed a concept car for a future replacement for both the executive car -3102 Volga and the luxury limousine GAZ-14 Chaika. However the resulting GAZ-3105, which was never to be part of the Volga family, as it would be produced on the Chaika's conveyor due to the economic problems never reached production.

=== GAZ-NAMI Volga Prestige (1995) ===
In 1995 NAMI designed a luxury model for GAZ based on the 3102 model, the concept was meant to compete with a variety of expensive Western cars widespread across the market followind the fall of Soviet Union. The concept featured a smoother exterior design, white leather interior, air conditioner, electric windows and adjustable rearview mirrors. Due to the production upgrade being too expensive for the factory Volga Prestige has never entered a serial production.

=== GAZ-3103/3104 Volga (1997) ===
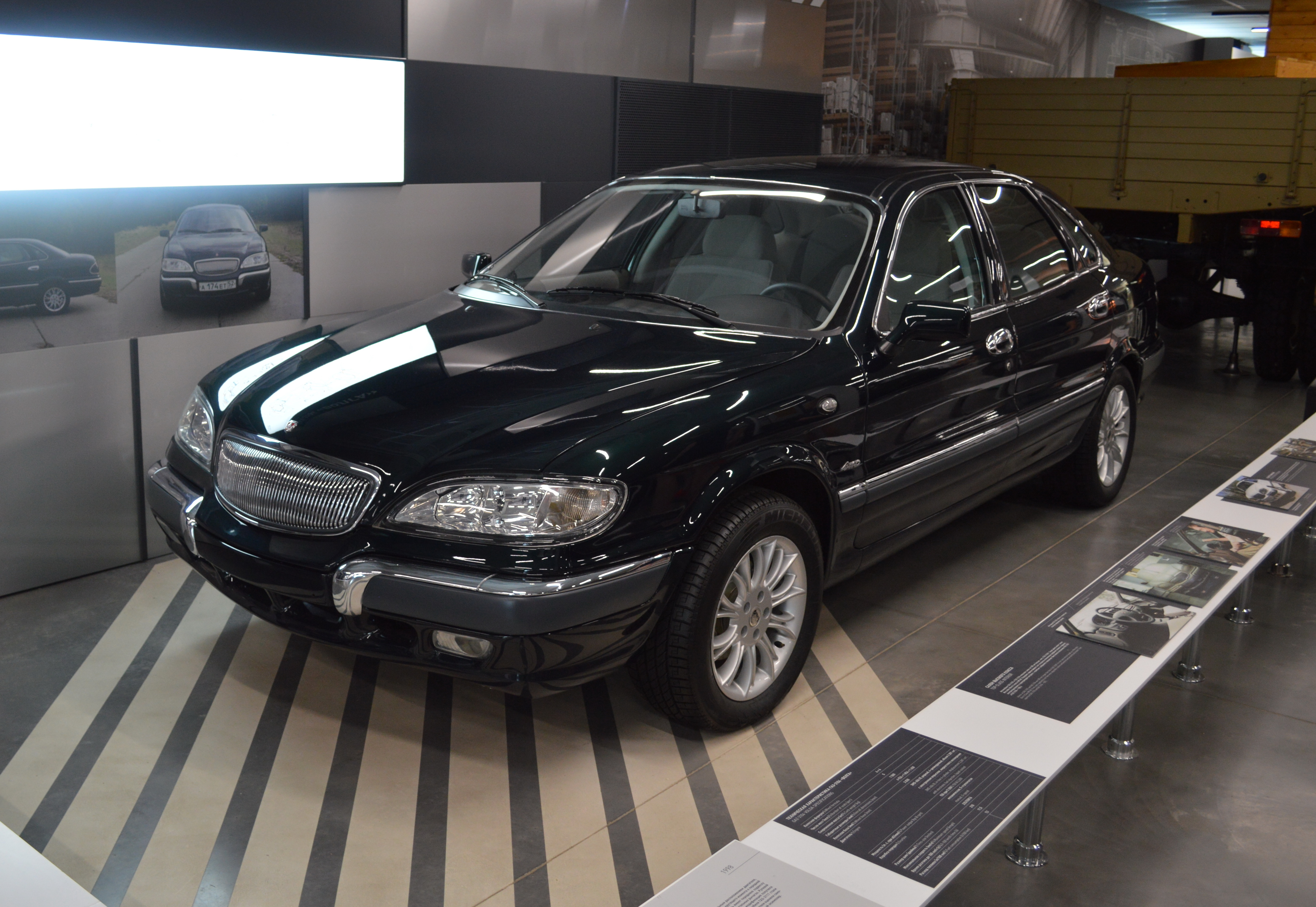
GAZ-3104 Volga (1997)

The cheaper replacement for 3105 was revealed at MIAS-1998 where it received the Design-98 award. To make the car shorter the engine was moved further in which resulted in car getting an extended asymmetric gear carter on the left side. The interior design was inspired by Audi, despite the car being an economy model it was large and was equipped with various electronics. It was planned to assemble two trims, 3103 with front-wheel drive and 3104 with all-wheel drive. Only a small number of cars was made since the economic situation didn't allow a full-scale production.

=== GAZ-3111 Volga (1998–2004) ===
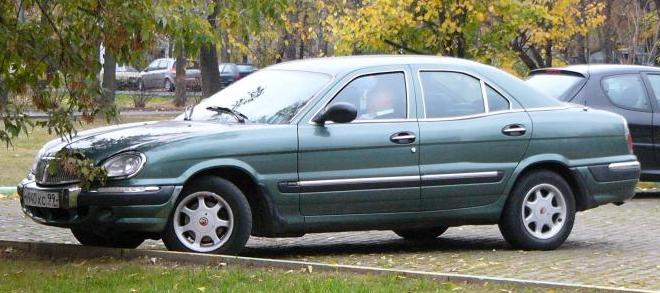
GAZ-3111 (1998–2004)

The GAZ-3111 was intended as a replacement for 3110 and had a design heavily inspired by GAZ-21, following the recent retro-style design trend. The car featured ABS, power steering, climate control, automatic gearbox, leather interior and V6 and V8 engines as standard. The start of production was scheduled to 2000, but the factory's new owner Oleg Deripaska was unimpressed with the vehicle visually and once again, the high price of the car prevented any interest to sales. As a result, only 428 cars were built as part of the pre-production batch.

=== GAZ-3115 Volga (2003) ===
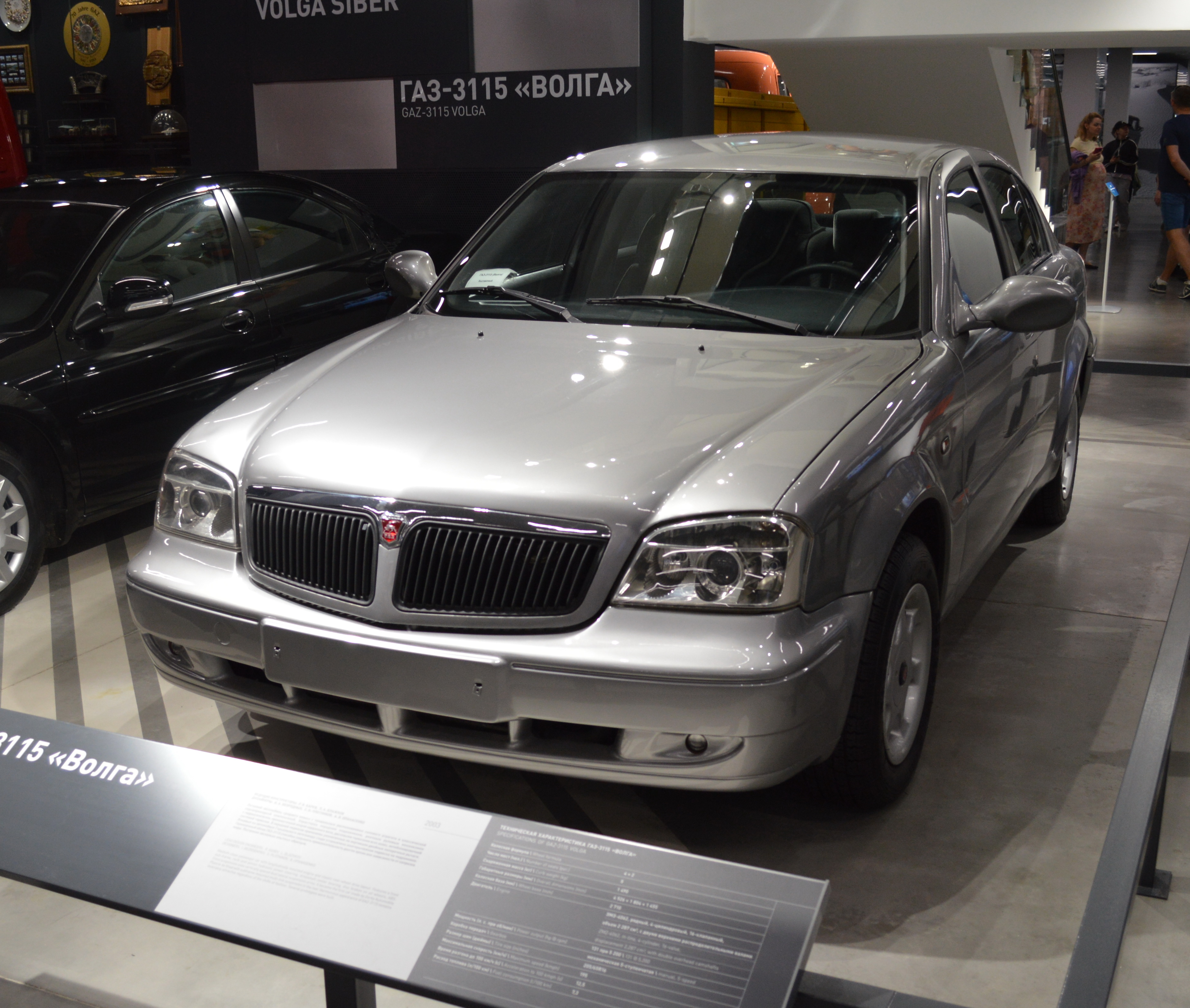
GAZ-3115 Volga (2003)

With Moskvitch going bankrupt in 2002 Russia was left without any domestic D-segment cars. GAZ decided to fill in the gap on the market by developing the GAZ-3115. The car was the smallest in the Volga family, it had sharper design and a multi-link independent rear suspension. The car had disc brakes and ABS but lacked any other electronic safety systems and automatic transmission to cut the cost. GAZ direction expected car price to be around $9000-$10000 however soon it began to doubt weather the model an compete with European cars or not. Eventually the production was cancelled in favor of truck assembly.

=== Volga Siber (2008–2010) ===
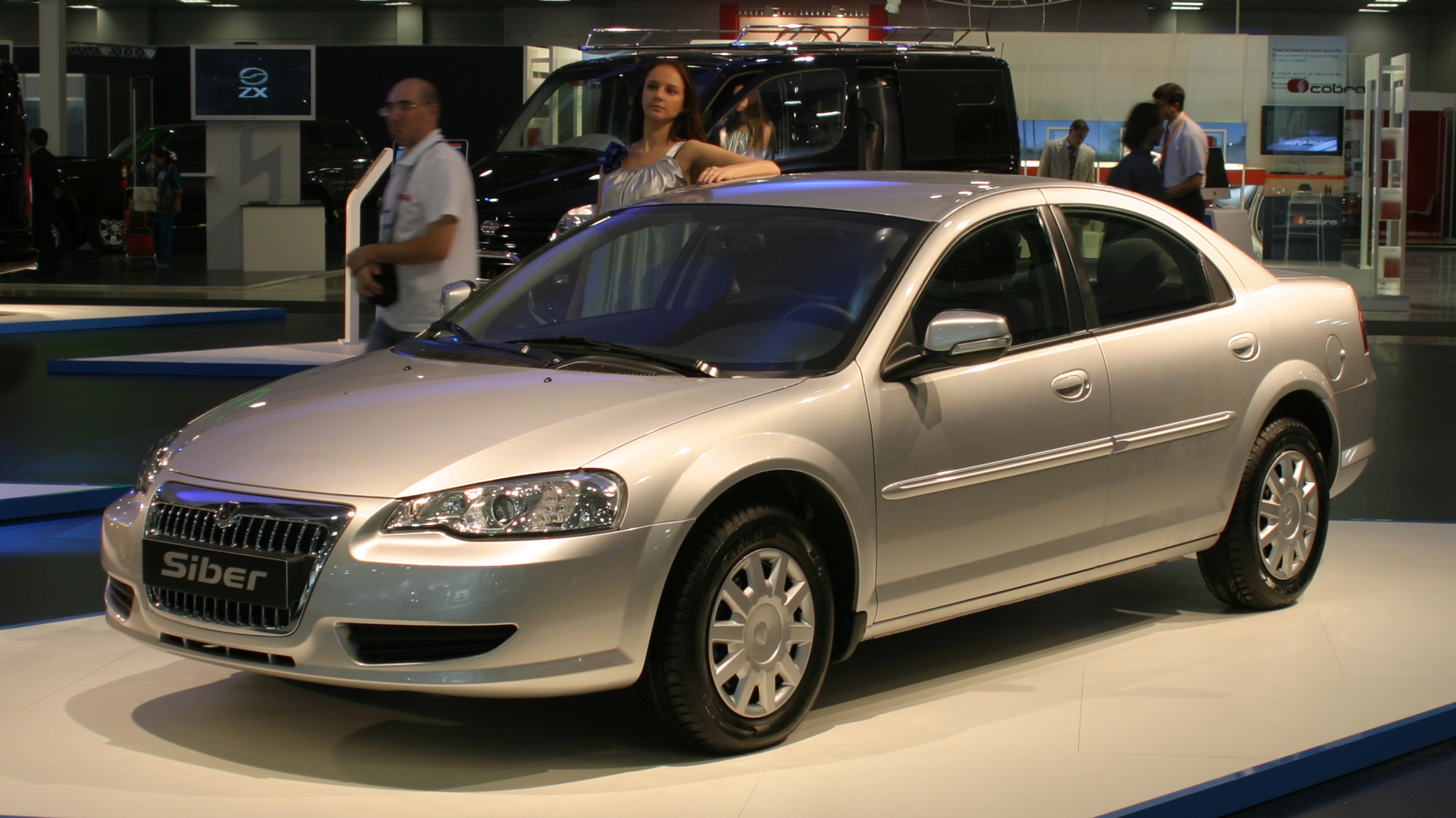
Volga Siber (2008–2010)

Although GAZ was developing a "spiritual successor" to the 3111, the front-wheel drive Volga 3115, in December 2005 RusPromAvto, the parent company of GAZ, announced that production of Volga passenger cars would be phased out over a 2-year period, with production to end in 2007. GAZ stated that they would instead concentrate on their more profitable truck, bus, and commercial vehicle businesses. At the same time the announcement was made, GAZ also introduced the Volga 311055, a long wheelbase derivative of the 31105. However, in the summer of 2006, GAZ reversed its earlier decision, announcing that further investments would be made in upgrading the styling and technology of the Volga saloons, keeping them in production as "retro" or "historical" vehicles. In early 2006, GAZ signed a deal with DaimlerChrysler to acquire the tooling and intellectual property rights for the Chrysler Sebring mid-size car design. GAZ stated that the new car would not carry the Volga brand.

When GAZ acquired the Chrysler Sebring license, it decided to further modify the car, and the Volga Siber was the result. The Volga Siber was unveiled in August 2007, and production began in July 2008, with a goal of producing 20,000 units the first year. However, sales figures were not met and only 2,500 Sibers were built in all of 2009.

In total, about 9,000 cars were produced during the 2008–2010 production run.

== Chinese revival ==
=== Volga C40/K30/K40 (2024) ===
After the Russian invasion of Ukraine in 2022, most foreign brands left the country which limited options in the Russian automobile market. This led to rumors about GAZ looking for Chinese partners to assemble their cars under the Volga brand, confirmed in 2023 by First Deputy Prime Minister Denis Manturov.

In March 2024 GAZ revealed the Volga C40 sedan based on Changan Raeton Plus, thr K30 crossover based on Changan X5 Plus, and the K40 SUV based on Changan UNI-Z. GAZ planned to assemble 100,000 cars per year. The production was planned to start by the end of 2024 but was postponed and eventually cancelled. Plans went far enough that in December 2024 the prototypes received temporary number plates for testing.

=== Volga C50/K40/K50 (2026–present) ===
After the Changan-based project was ultimately canceled before entering mass production, in September 2025 industry reports surfaced indicating that the partnership had shifted toward another Chinese manufacturer. In February 2026, GAZ restructured the revival program by signing a ten-year Special Investment Contract (SPIC) with the Ministry of Industry and Trade, pivoting to a licensing partnership with Geely and committing over 60 billion rubles toward localization.

On June 2nd, 2026, GAZ revealed the Volga C50 sedan based on Geely Xingrui, the K40 crossover based on Geely Boyue L, and the larger K50 crossover based on Geely Xingyue L.

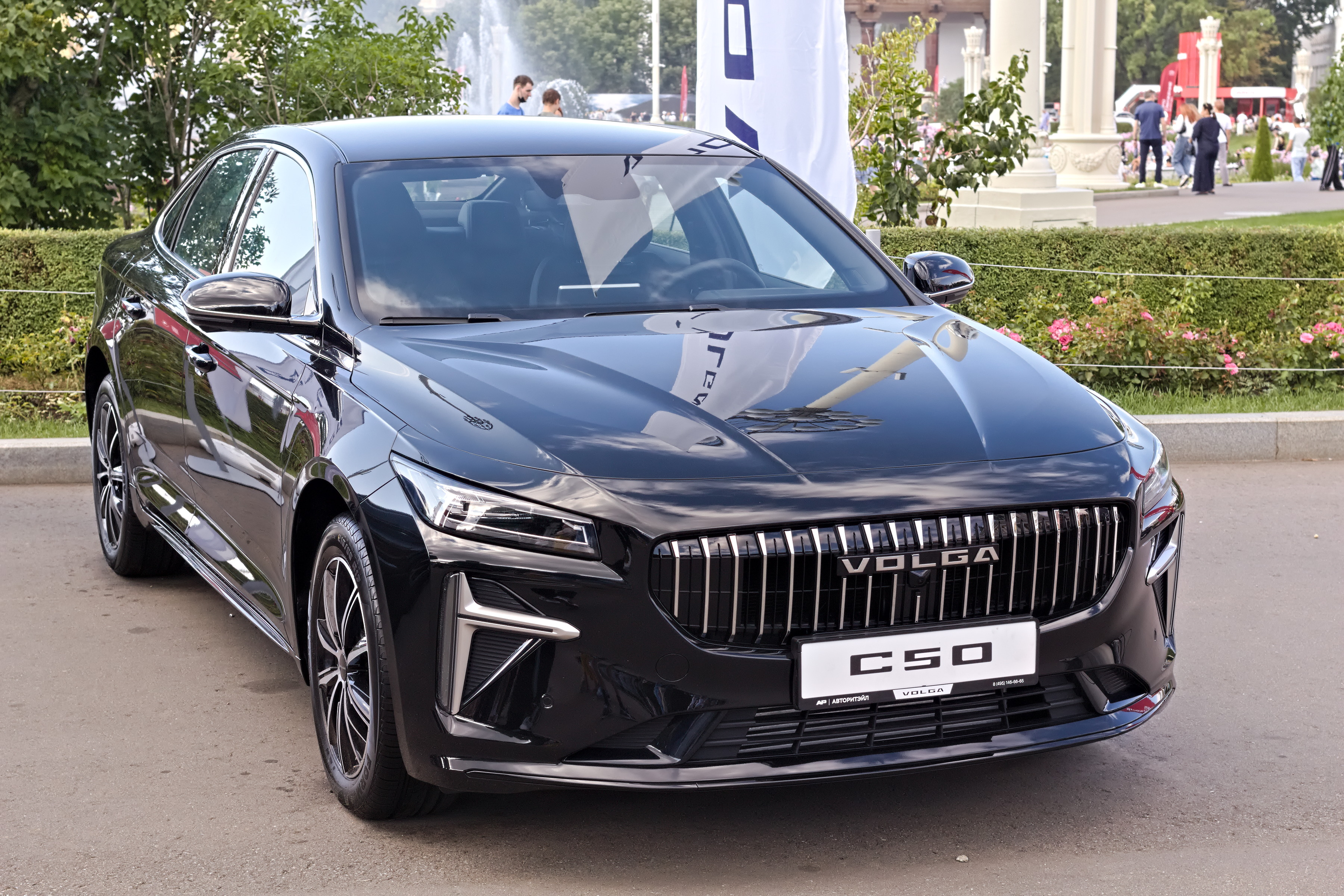
Volga C50 (2026–present)

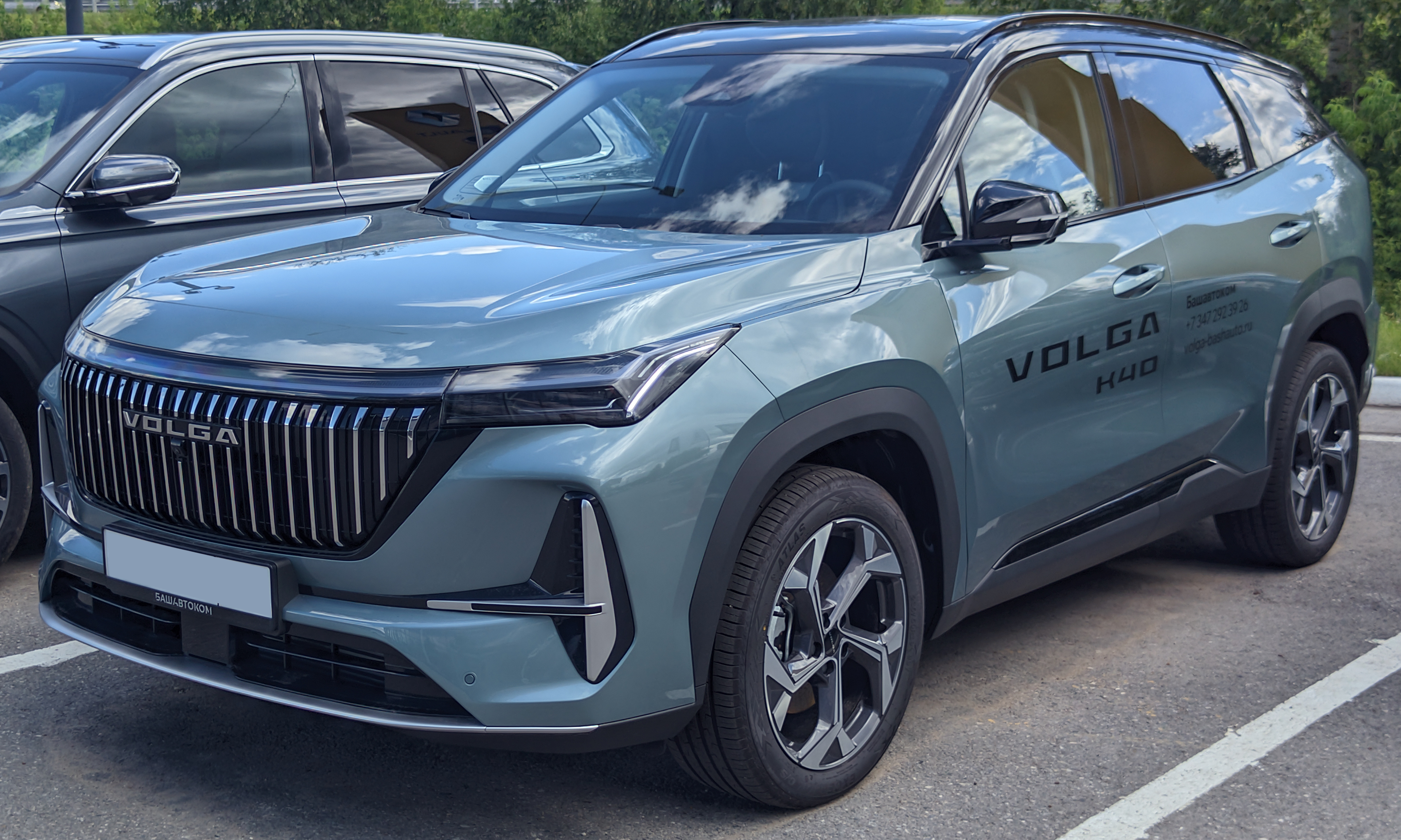
Volga K40 (2026–present)

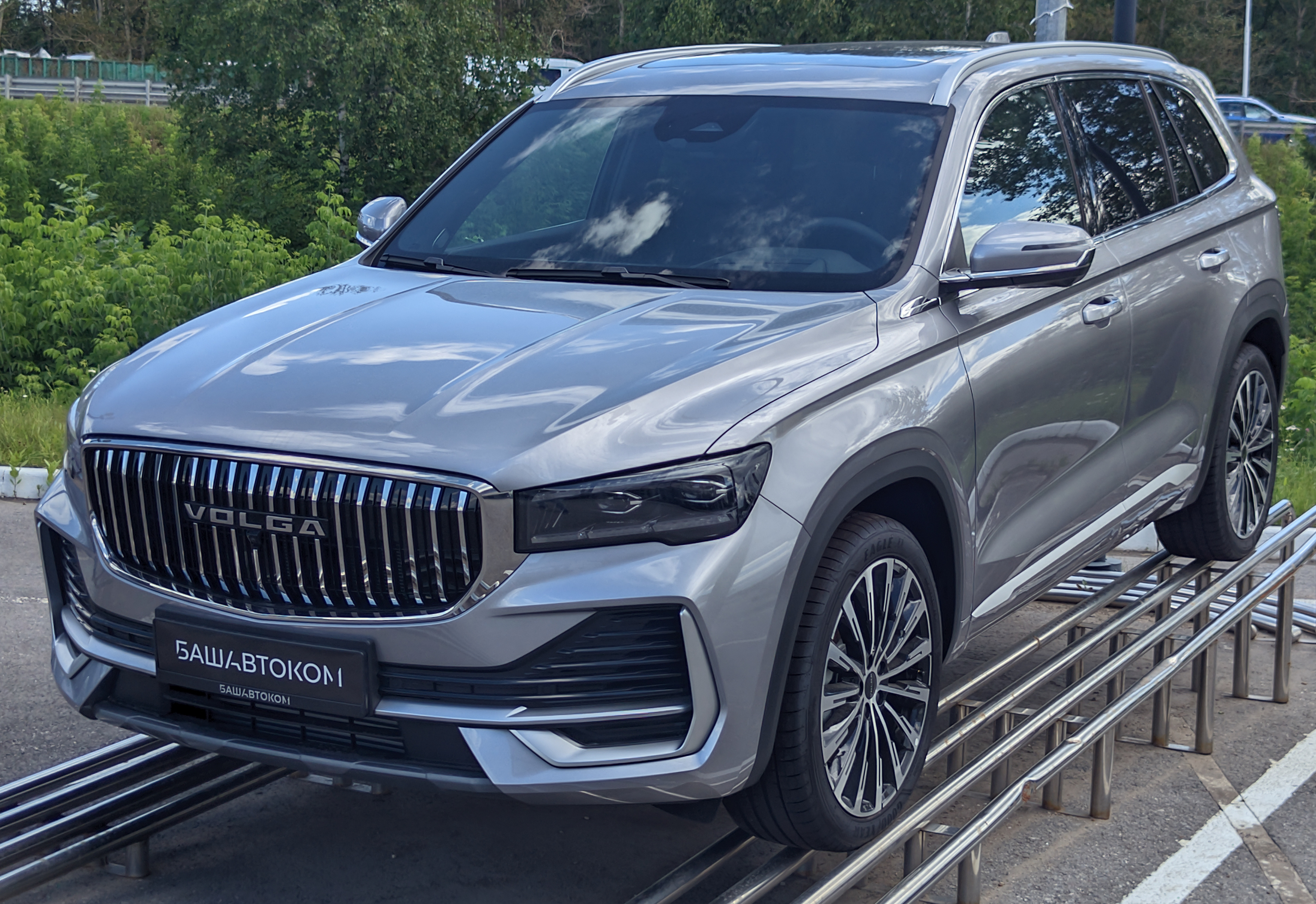
Volga K50 (2026–present)

== See also ==
- Black Volga
- Hongqi CA770
