= Changan Raeton =

Chinese mid-size sedan

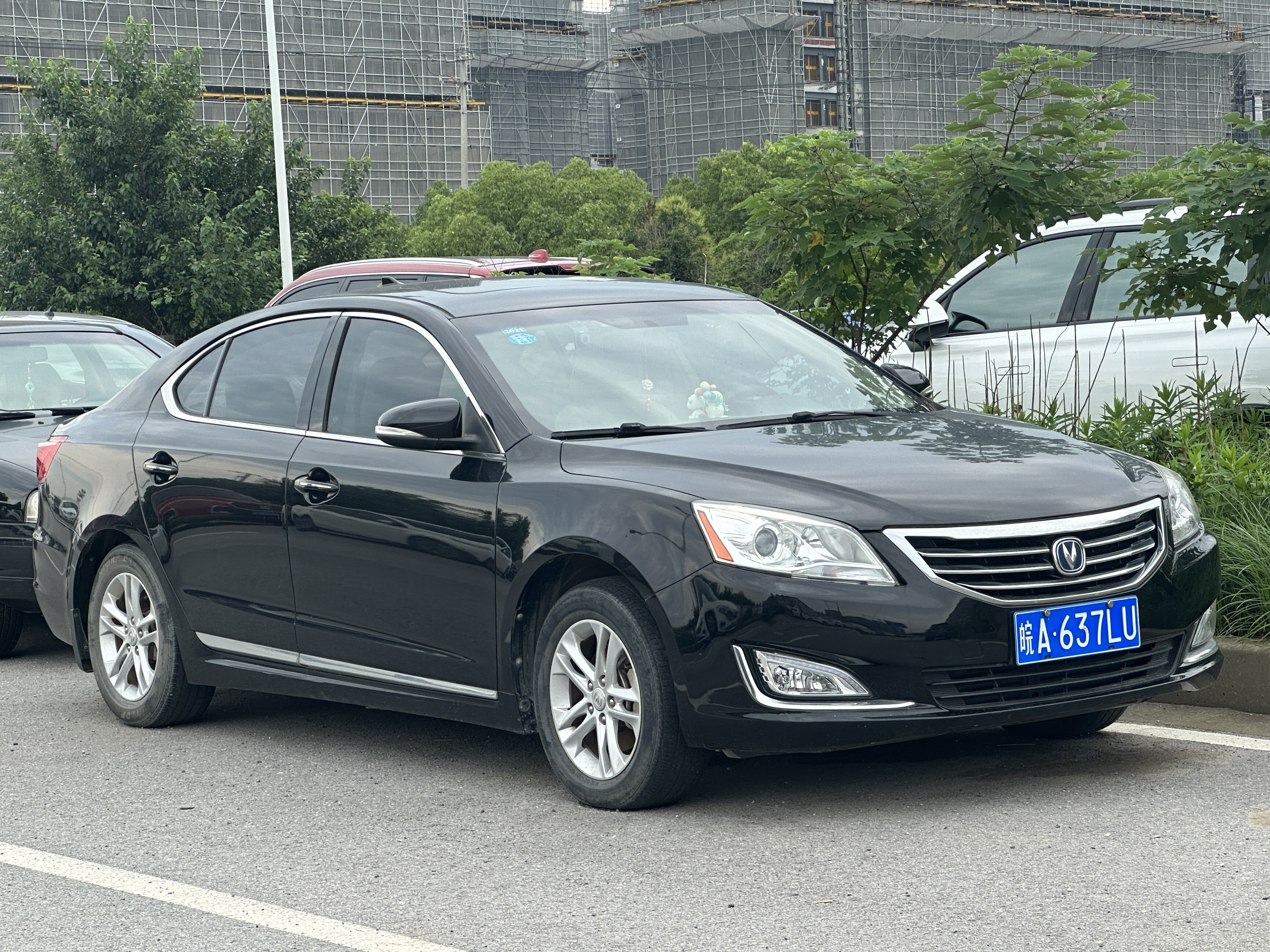

Overview
- Manufacturer: Changan Automobile
- Also called: Changan CD101
- Production: 2012–2019
- Model years: 2013–2019

Body and chassis
- Class: Mid-size car (D)
- Layout: Front-engine, front-wheel drive
- Related: Changan Raeton CC

Powertrain
- Engine: 1.5 L JL476ZQCA I4 (turbo petrol); 1.8 L Blue Core I4 (turbo petrol); 2.0 L Blue Core I4 (petrol)
- Transmission: 5-speed automatic; 6-speed automatic

Dimensions
- Wheelbase: 2,810 mm (110.6 in)
- Length: 4,900 mm (192.9 in)
- Width: 1,860 mm (73.2 in)
- Height: 1,500 mm (59.1 in)
- Curb weight: 3,516 lb (1,595 kg)

The Changan Raeton (Chinese: 睿骋) is a mid-size sedan produced by Changan Automobile. The Raeton is Changan's flagship and largest sedan.

== Overview ==
Changan Raeton debuted at the 2012 Beijing Auto Show and was launched on the Chinese car market in 2013.

During the 2013 Auto Shanghai, a stretched version of the Raeton was unveiled while the production Raeton sedan is powered by a 1.8-liter turbo engine producing 175 bhp (130 kW).

According to the updated official website in 2018, the pricing of the post-facelift Changan Raeton ranges from 120,800 to 150,800 yuan RMB. The Raeton is designed by the Changan design center in Turin, Italy, just like the CS35 CUV and Eado sedan.

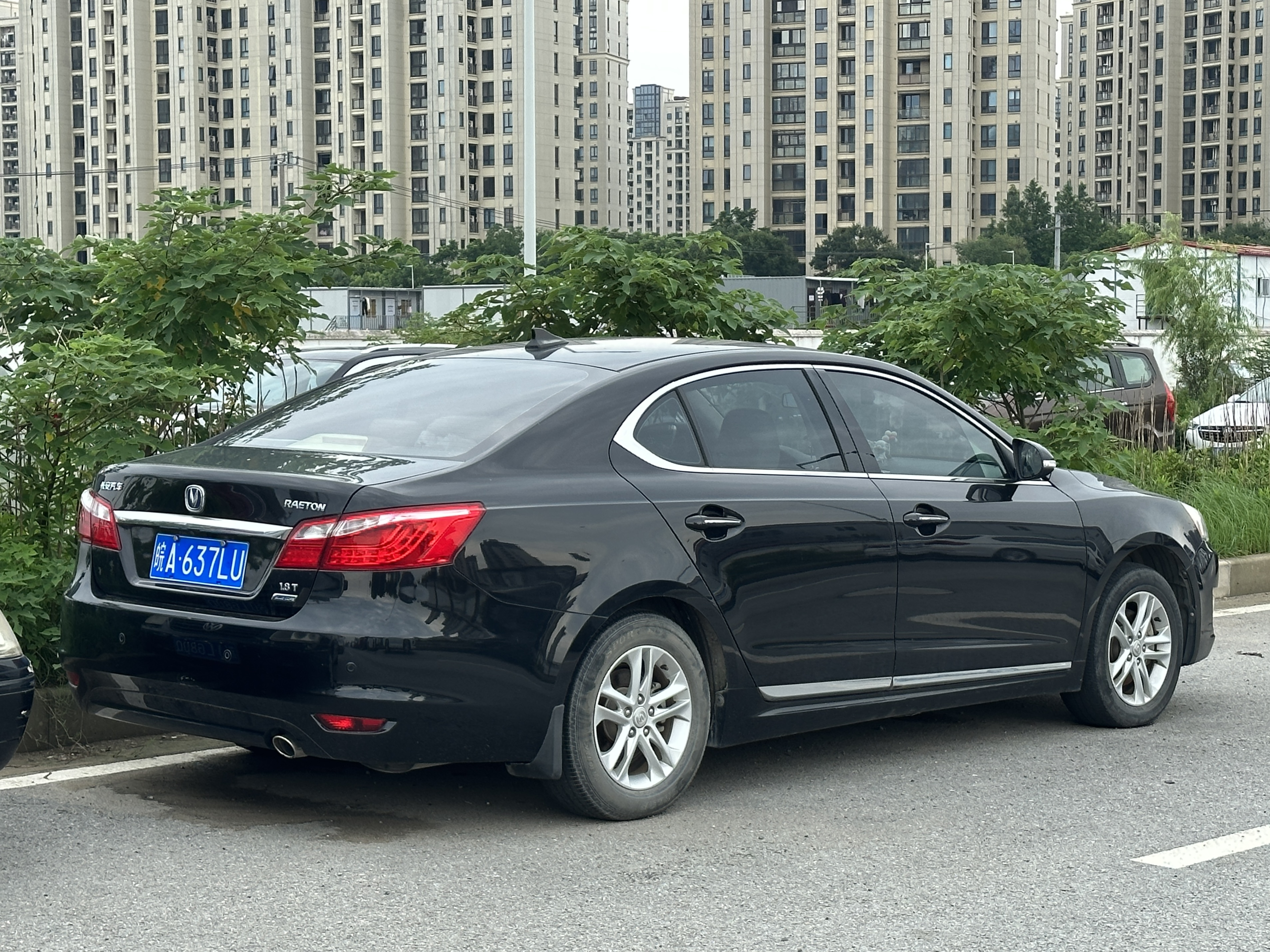
Changan Raeton rear
