= Alexander Uzlyan =

Russian Photojournalist

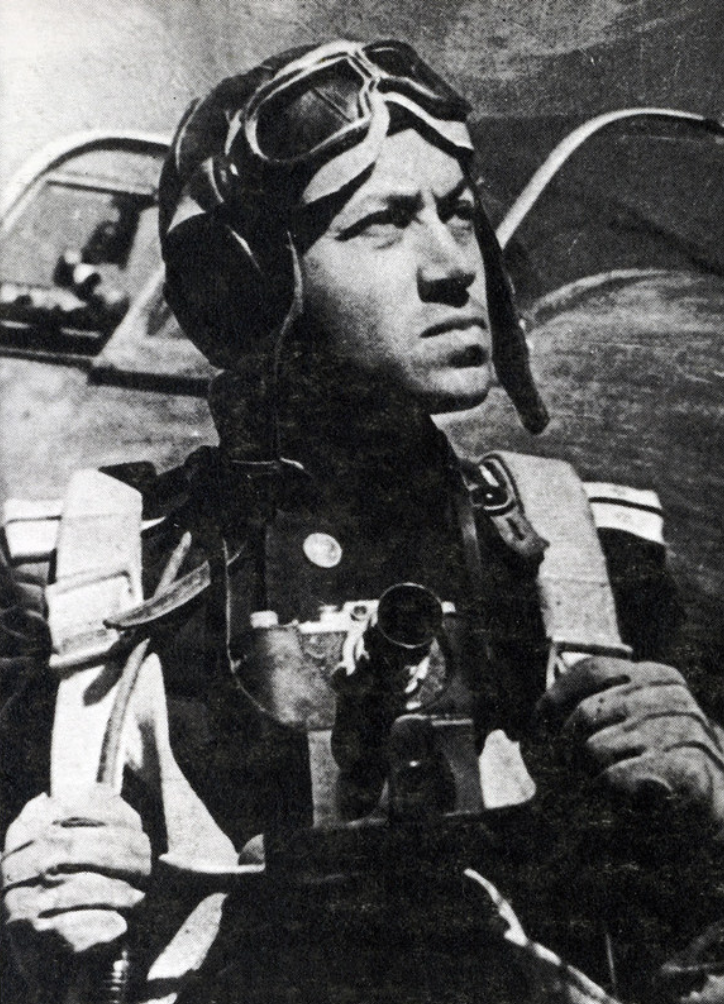
- Alexander Uzlyan, 1940s
- Born: 1908; Rostov-on-Don, Russian Empire
- Died: 1980s United States
- Known for: Photography

Alexander (Aleksandr) Arkadyevich Uzlyan (Russian: Александр Аркадьевич Узлян; 1908–198?) was a Russian news photographer, photojournalist and war photographer who migrated to the United States in later life.

== Life and work ==
Alexander Uzlyan was born in Rostov-on-Don in 1908. He graduated from the Soviet Higher State Institute of Cinematography. In the 1930s he joined the staff of Komsomolskaya Pravda, the newspaper of the Young Communist League.

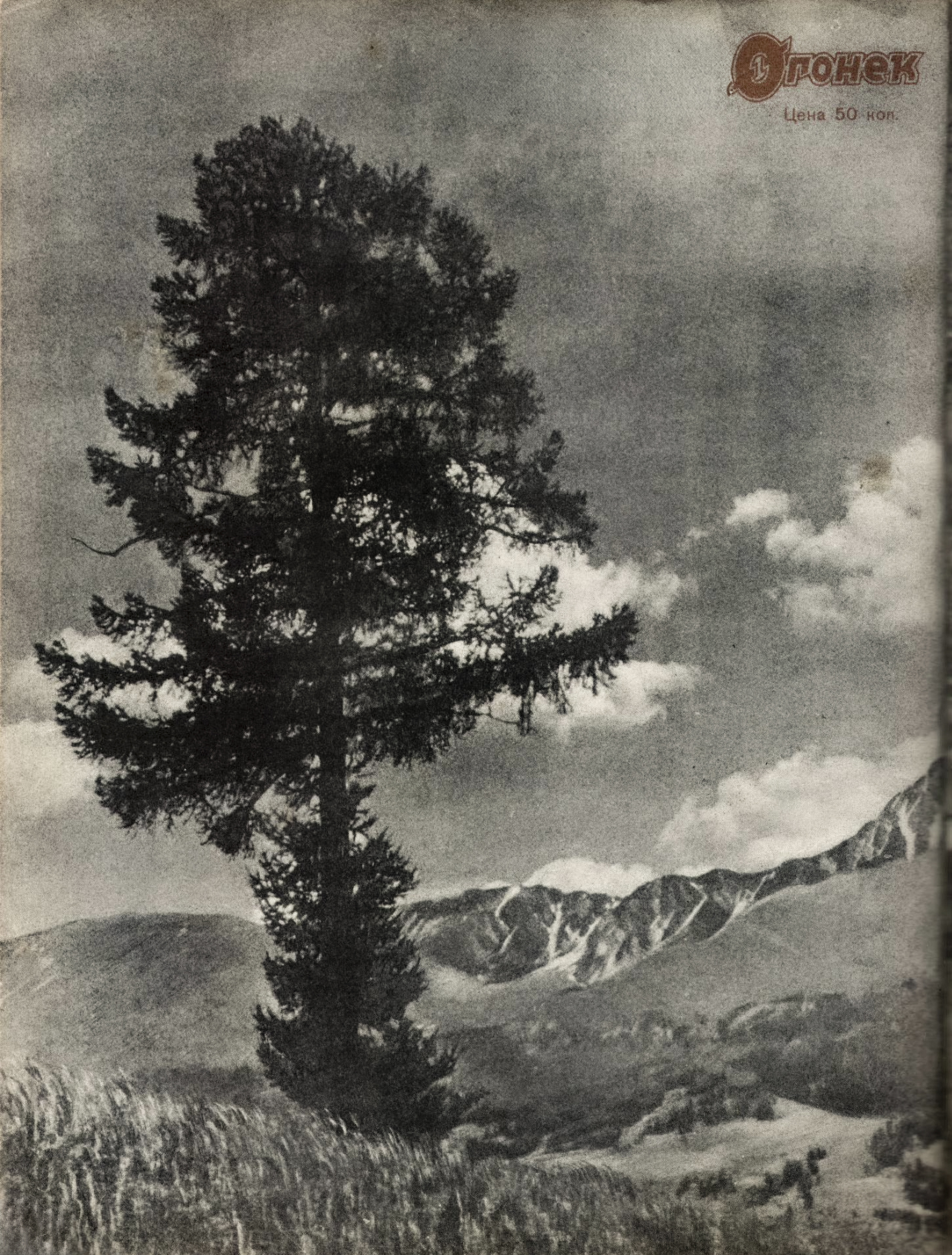
Alexander Uzlyan (1940) Ogoniok, back cover, 10 September 1940 issue #25

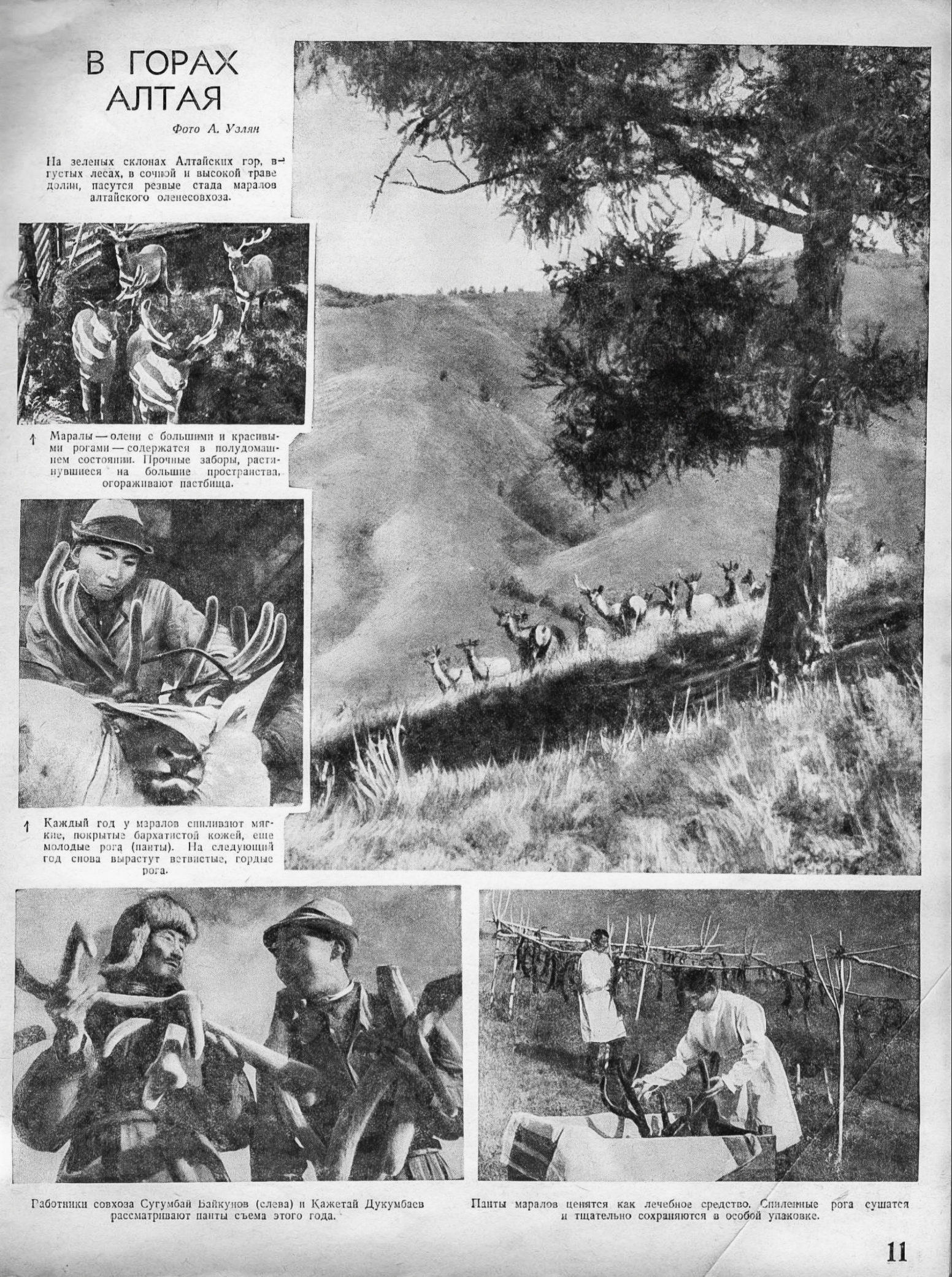
Alexander Uzlyan (1940) 'In The Atlai Mountains' single-page spread from Ogoniok No. 27 (714) Monday, September 30, 1940

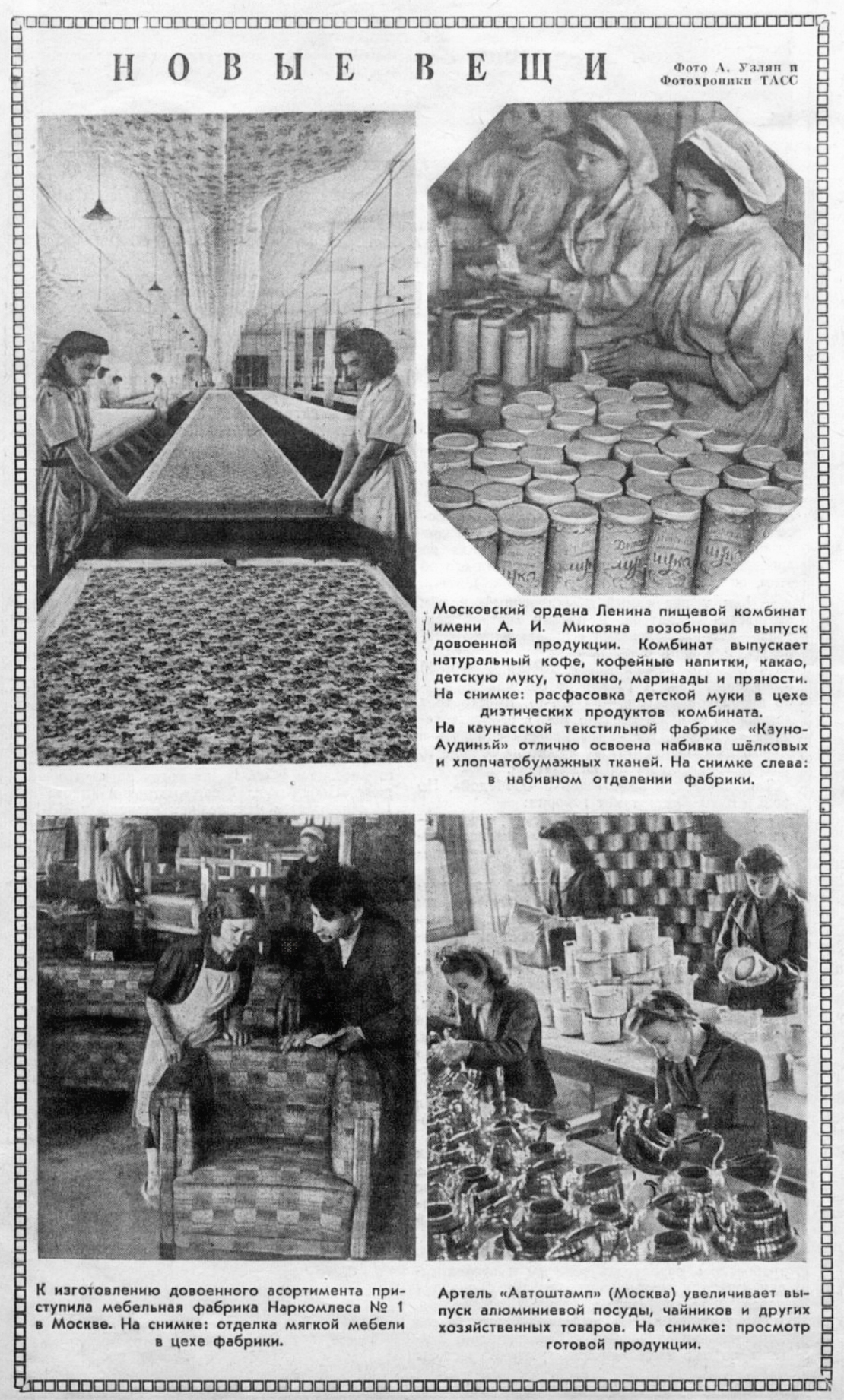
A. Uzlyan for TASS Photo Narkomles furniture factory and Order of Lenin Food Processing Plant, Moscow

Uzlyan went on to work as a photojournalist for various Russian news organisations, including Izvestiya, Pravda, Literaturnaya Gazeta, and Ogonyok.

During World War II he accompanied the Black Sea Fleet, documenting its activities for the Soviet Information Bureau. His photographic record of Soviet naval exploits during the war, which illustrate several histories including The Russian War: 1941-45, have been described as giving "an impression of movement that is almost like a motion picture." Uzylan creatively applied the use of slow shutter speeds and panning, as his colleague Lev Nisnevich recalled of his promotional photography of factory workers in 1973, made when Uzylan was white-haired and sixty-five years old:

In this case Uzlyan is theatrical director. We find some workers who look basically all right, then Uzlyan goes work on them. He tells one guy roll his sleeves. And he's giving another one a paper ... before he rehearsed them walking into the frame.

Post-war, his picture stories appeared in such publications as the English-language USSR: Soviet Life Today, and from the mid-1960s, he photographed for the Literaturnaya gazeta and documented various Russian cities for tourist articles. One of his heroic industrial images featured in a 1970 Pravda photo competition. In 1971 Uzlyan explained his process:

The subject, its precise selection, and its significance are very essential factors in the work of a photojournalist. A broad public information base assists in the search and selection of a subject. One must always be aware of the latest news from newspapers, radio, and television, not out of a desire to borrow and repeat of course, but the information obtained in this way serves as a means of "guidance" and approach to the material. It allows me to correctly determine the place and significance of the subject.

And yet, the main source of information in the broadest sense remains life itself, in all its infinite diversity. Everything I see, hear, and "discover" myself brings valuable qualities such as spontaneity, originality, and a personal vision.

It's not only the significant and large-scale that can be of interest to a journalist. Often, a characteristic detail or touch that can't be immediately used is deposited in the collection of observations...first and foremost, people. Behind phenomena and events, it is important and essential to see the individual—with their multicoloured palette of feelings, their inner world...And now, when I think about new series of photographs dedicated to people in unremarkable and everyday professions—a rural pharmacist, an accountant, a watchmaker, a bus driver, a nurse—I primarily seek means that would support my desire to accurately and clearly convey to the reader at least a modicum of human warmth.

== Later life ==
In 1974 G. Кovalenko writing in Sovetskoe Foto, rated Uzlyan among several "grandmasters" of photography alongside Dmitry Baltermants and Mark Redkin.

Uzlyan emigrated from the Soviet Union to Israel in 1972, then to the United States in 1975, and in 1980 was living in Silver Spring, Maryland, with his wife and daughter..By the time he emigrated from the Soviet Union his archive consisted of over 40,000 photos, but he was only allowed to bring 1,000 with him.

== Legacy ==
His photograph (credited only to 'Sovfoto') of a father and son doing calisthenics indoors in their underwear was sourced by Wayne Miller for MoMA's world-touring 1955 exhibition The Family of Man curated by Edward Steichen. Examples of his work, among that of more than 400 photographers from whose work Novosti editors selected the 1,200, were included in the exhibition USSR Photo-70, the first showcasing photographs from the Soviet Union. Directed by Yevgeny Ruzhnikov, it toured Washington, New York, Chicago, San Francisco, San Antionio, and New Orleans and was seen by 103,000 visitors in Chicago, and 47,000 in San Francisco. Uzlyan's photographs are still being distributed through Sovfoto and Rosfoto agencies.
