= Yuri Eremin =

Russian painter and photographer (1881–1948)

- Born: 1881; Kazanskaya, Don Host Oblast, Russian Empire
- Died: 1948 (aged 66–67); Moscow, USSR
- Known for: Photography
- Movement: Pictorialism
- Awards: Award in multiple national and international competitions

Yuri Eremin (Russian: Юрий Ерёмин; 1881, Kazanskaya, Voyskoy Donskoy Oblast — 1948, Moscow) was a Russian and Soviet artist and photographer, a representative of pictorialism.

Eremin studied at the Moscow School of Painting, Sculpture and Architecture in the class of Apollinary Vasnetsov, attended drawing classes at the private Julian Academy in Paris, and after the October Revolution at the Higher Art and Technical Studios in Moscow. In photography, Eremin emerged as a creative personality before the Revolution, but became widely known in the 1920s and 1930s as a master of architectural and landscape photography, as well as for his nude photographs. During this period, he was an active participant in national and international exhibitions and professional discussions. From the late 1920s, his work was repeatedly criticized, but he continued to teach at universities and in Moscow photographic circles, held important positions in the civil service, and published photographs in major Soviet publications.

Interest in Yuri Eremin's work continued in Soviet art history even after his death in 1948. In 1966, a monograph on the photographer's life and work was published, and in the 1970s and 1980s, a number of articles appeared in prestigious professional and socio-political publications. Interest in his work intensified at the end of the 20th and the beginning of the 21st century, when personal exhibitions of Eremin's photographs were held in Paris and Moscow.

== Biography ==
=== Childhood and youth ===
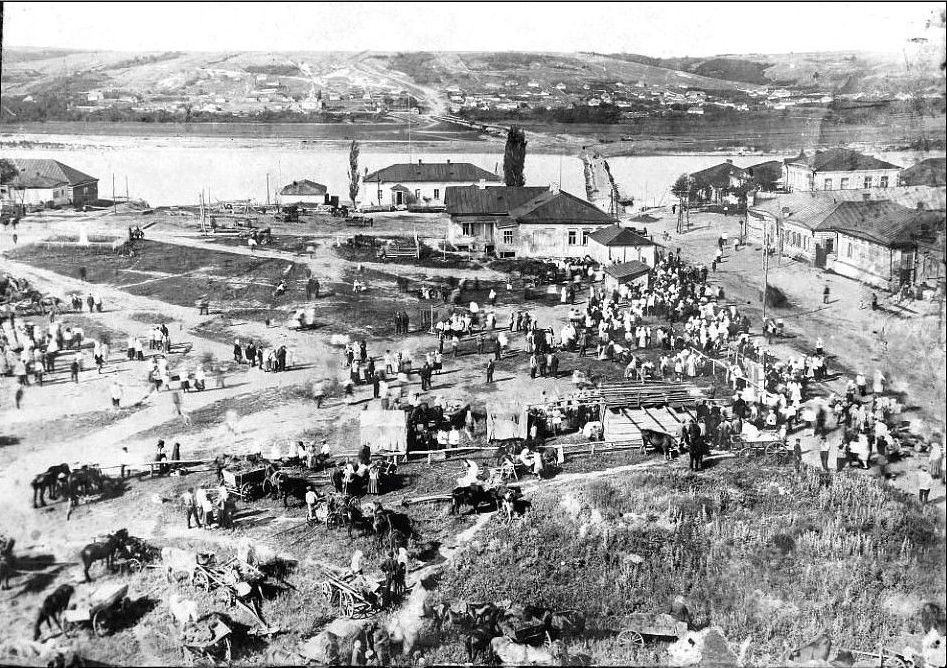
The Kazanskaya village in the early 20th century. View from the church to the Market Square.

Yuri Eremin was born in 1881 in the village of Kazanskaya in the Don Host province, in a poor family of a Cossack peasants. At a young age he lost his parents, and from the age of two his education was taken over by his grandfather Pavel Petrovich Besschetnov. According to one version, Eremin is the illegitimate son of a Don Cossack and an Italian painter, who came as part of an artel to paint the Stanitsa church. After the boy's birth, his father and comrades fled, fearing reprisals from the mother's compatriots. The child's surname was invented and he received his patronymic from his great-grandfather.

Eremin studied at the local two-class school and was successful in all subjects. At that time, he began to draw secretly. As a young man, Eremin attended a short course for drawing teachers at the Novocherkassk Teachers' Seminary. For some time after that he worked in a small school on the Verkhnechirsky farm in the village of Migulinskaya stanitsa. The salary was low, and he took papers for rewriting, moonlighted as a reader for the local landowner, and in the summer worked in the coal mines of Donbass. According to Valery Stigneev's version, Eremin used this money to go to Moscow for education. In 1900, the young man entered the Moscow School of Painting, Sculpture and Architecture in the class of Apollinarius Vasnetsov. Simultaneously with his studies, Eremin collected and edited works of oral folk art, composed poems and stories.

According to some sources, Yuri Eremin graduated from the school in 1905, received the title of independent artist, and then worked professionally in the Crimea: he made commissioned portraits, painted rich mansions, and designed sets for an amateur theater. According to others, he was forced to leave the school due to lack of funds for his studies (the historian and theorist of photography, Honored Cultural Worker of the RSFSR Sergey Morozov in his book Artistic Photography gives another reason — illness, although in an earlier book, published in 1955, he wrote that Eremin graduated from the school) and began to work as an office clerk on the Moscow-Kursk railway.

=== First steps in photography ===
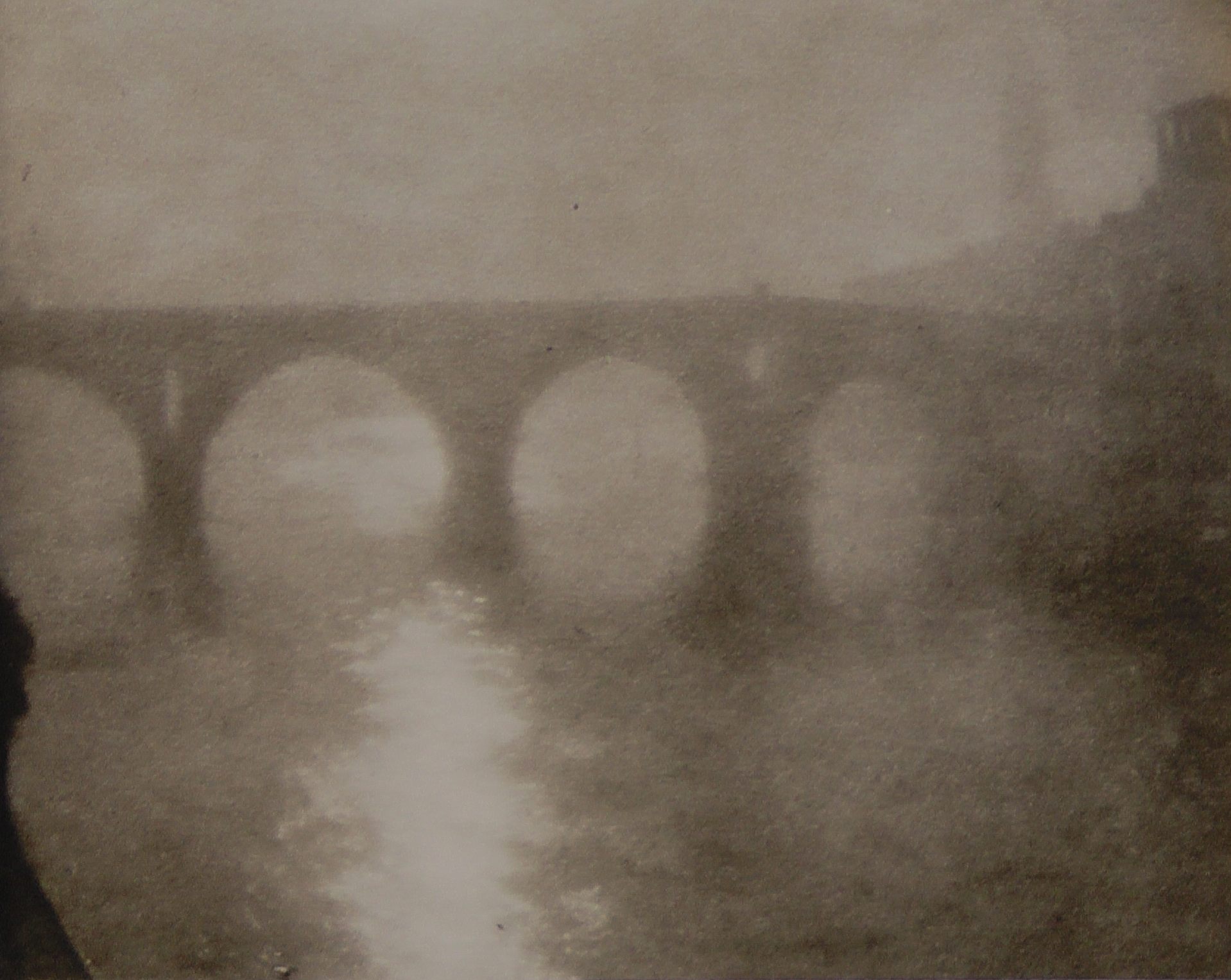
Yuri Eremin. Bridge in Verona, 1907

In 1909, Yuri Eremin successfully married, and thanks to his dowry he received funds for traveling in Europe. In 1910–1914, (there is an opinion that he made his first trip in 1907) he traveled through Germany, Austria, Belgium, Switzerland, France, Italy, Greece. During his travels he practiced self-education. In Paris, Eremin took drawing classes at the private Académie Julian and philosophy classes at the Sorbonne. He visited archaeological sites, museums, and exhibition halls. He was seriously impressed by the paintings of Nicolas Poussin, Jacques-Louis David, Titian, Paolo Veronese, but his greatest admiration was for the paintings of the French impressionists.

During his travels, Eremin took many photographs (Valery Stigneev dates the beginning of his passion for photography to 1905). Among the pictures was a technically difficult photograph Bridge in Verona, taken during a heavy fog. He showed this photo to Apollinary Vasnetsov. On his recommendation, the photograph was sent to the International Exhibition of Art Photography in Nice in 1907, where it received the highest award — the Honorary Diploma. Later the photograph was shown at exhibitions in Antwerp, Rome, Berlin and Moscow. Sergei Morozov wrote about this photograph: "Almost devoid of subject matter, it created a mood. Yuri Eremin's landscape was perceived by the heart much warmer than carefully executed architectural photos with an abundance of details".

In 1908, on his own initiative, Eremin presented his photograph the Calm, stylized as a graphic, at the International Photographic Exhibition in Naples. In 1910, he became a member of the Russian Photographic Society (Note: Anatoly Popov details the activities of the Russian Photography Society in the pre-revolutionary period in his monograph.) where he initially joined the formalist group.

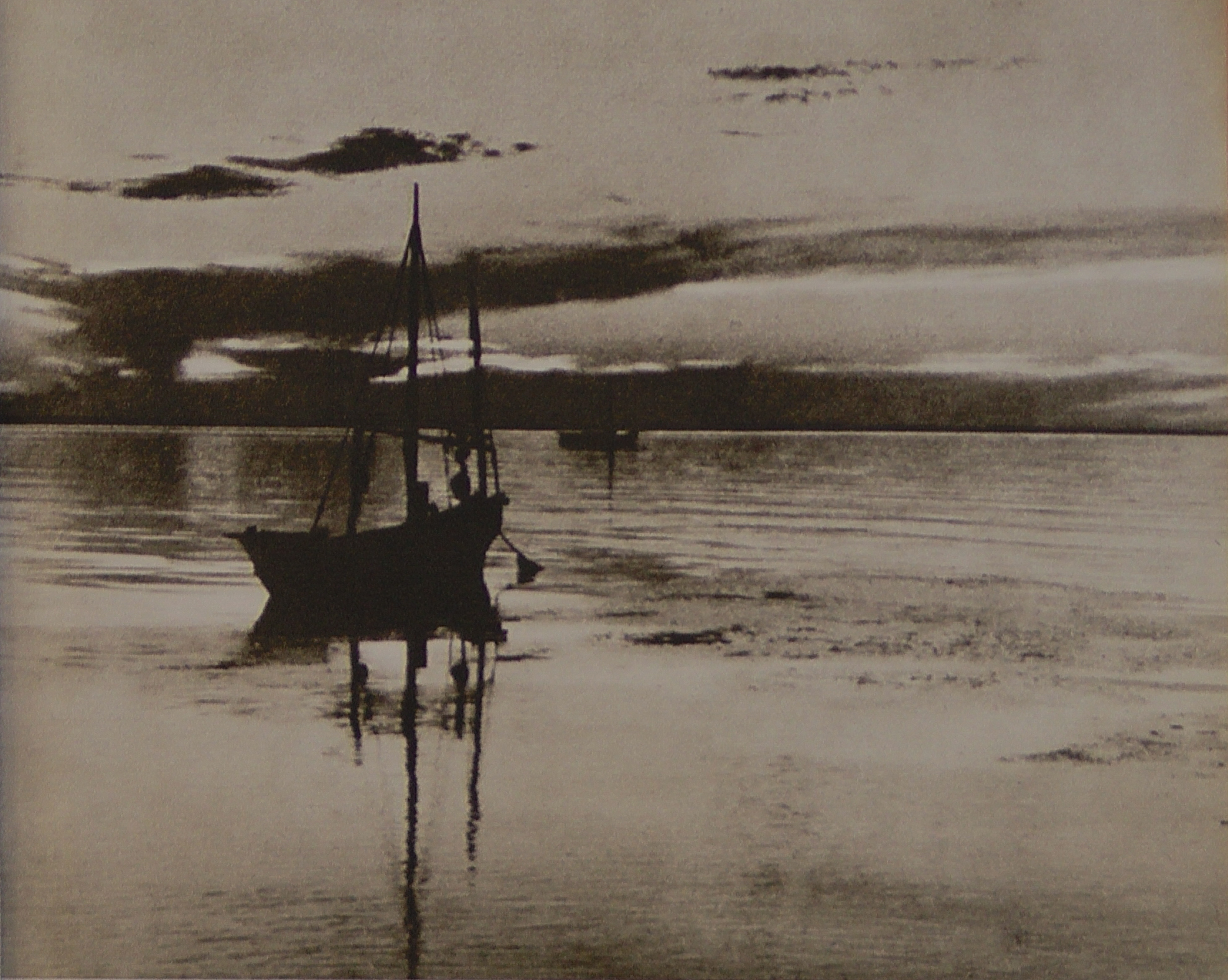
Yuri Eremin. The Calm, 1908

Eremin's teachers at the Russian Photographic Society (RPS) were the photographers Anatoly Trapani and Sergei Savrasov (nephew of the painter Alexei Savrasov). They adhered to the pictorialist direction in art photography and were active participants in a small creative group called Molodoye Iskusstvo (Young Art). Its members saw the quality of the pictures in their closeness to painting. Eremin regularly attended the meetings of this group. From Trapani he learned how to stylize a photograph under the artist's brushstrokes, charcoal drawing, gouache, etching. From Savrasov, Eremin learned the simplicity and wholeness of the composition of photography. At that time he considered photography to be "the art of small forms", so he paid great attention to the careful finishing of the print and its external design. In 1913, Eremin took a course in copper and zinc engraving; he turned some of his photographic landscapes into etchings. In 1914, Eremin opened a photographic studio in Moscow called Secession, which was engaged in the creation of artistic pavilion portraits. (Note: Stigneev and Chulkov date this studio differently in a 2013 paper. According to them, Yeremin opened Secession in 1918, and the studio existed until 1922.)

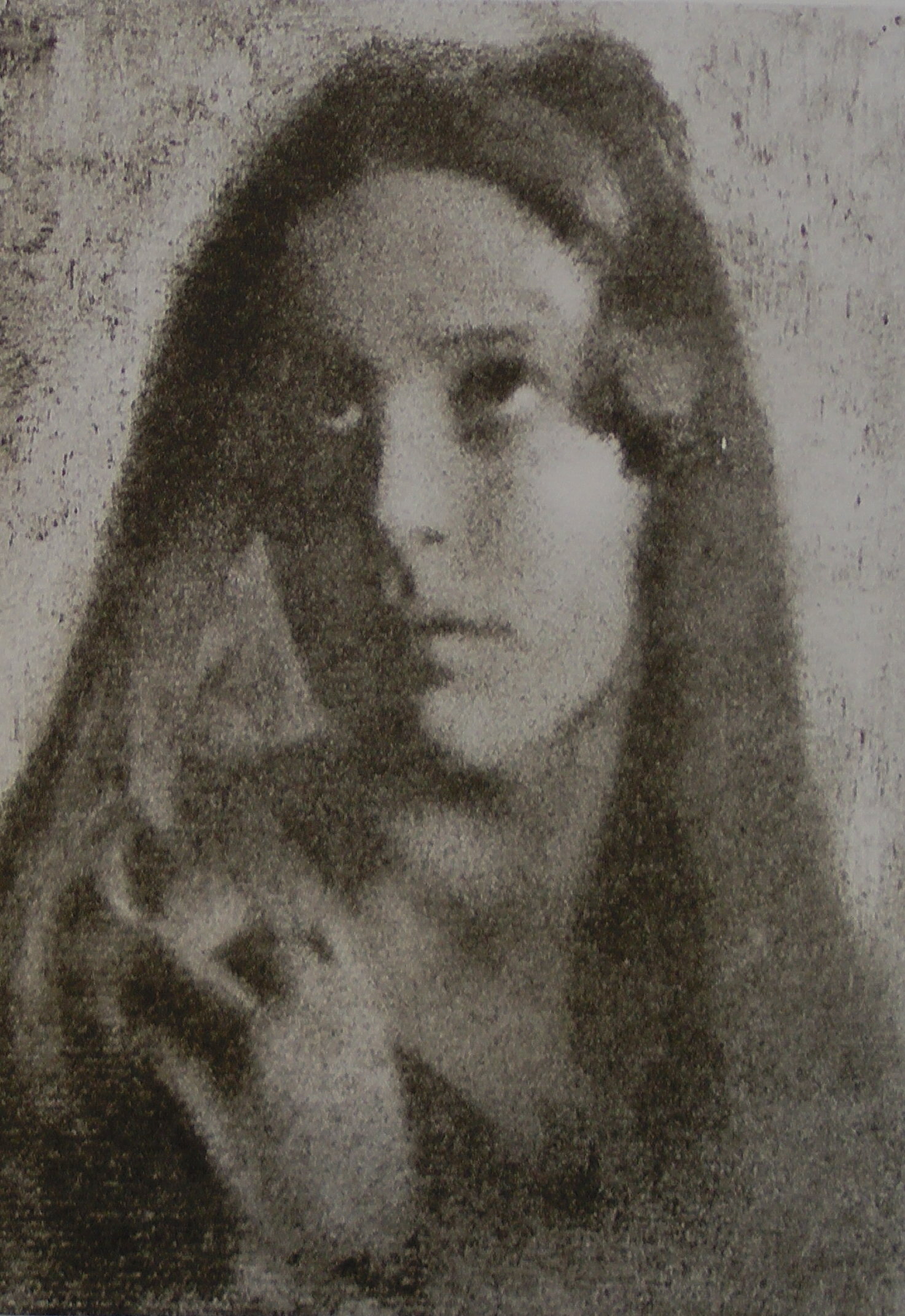
Yuri Eremin. Madonna, 1914

According to Anatoly Fomin, Yuri Eremin was recruited into the active army in 1915 as a photo correspondent for the Third Army. During this time, he was forced to abandon his poetic view of the world around him and emphasize the documentary character of photography. After the October Revolution, Eremin was demobilized and returned to Moscow. He returned to his profession as a photographer and to his usual style of photography. The biography of photographer Valery Stigneev tells a different story. According to his version, Eremin worked as an X-ray technician in a Moscow hospital during World War I, and since 1915, in one of the organizations of the All-Russian Zemsky Union. (Note: Attempts have been made to reconcile the two versions. For example, the Russian Museum website reported that Eremin was first the head of the x-ray room at the free Soldatenkovskaya hospital, and then in 1915, he was drafted into the army (according to Valery Valran, he was drafted in 1916, and served until 1918, the same point of view adopted by Valery Stigneev in his 2016 book on the history of Soviet photography). Another sequence of events is presented in a 2000, article by Anatoly Chulkov: first Eremin serves in the army as a photojournalist, and from 1915 he works as a private radiographer.) Art historian, candidate of philosophy Valery Stigneev was surprised that the only mention of Eremin in connection with photography in the press at that time was his election as a member of the board of the RPS for the period 1915–1918. Eremin's surname, he says, had not appeared in the pages of Vestnik Photographii (Photography Herald) before, and his pictures were not published in the following period. He did not participate in the monthly competitions of the RPS and did not appear on the lists of the winners of the photographic competitions.

=== After the October Revolution ===
In 1918, Eremin worked as a photographer for the Moscow Provincial Commission for the Protection of Antiquities. From 1919 to 1928, he was head of photography at the Moscow Criminal Investigation Department. He organized the photographic museum of the MUR. He also studied for some time at Vkhutemas (according to Valrand, Eremin did not graduate), worked at the Press-Klishe Agency (the predecessor of TASS Photochronicle), at Exportizdat, and was on the editorial board of Photographer magazine (1926-1929). After that, Eremin became a teacher of photography at universities. Among them: Leningrad Higher Art and Technical Institute, Moscow Polygraphic Institute, and Moscow Architectural Institute.

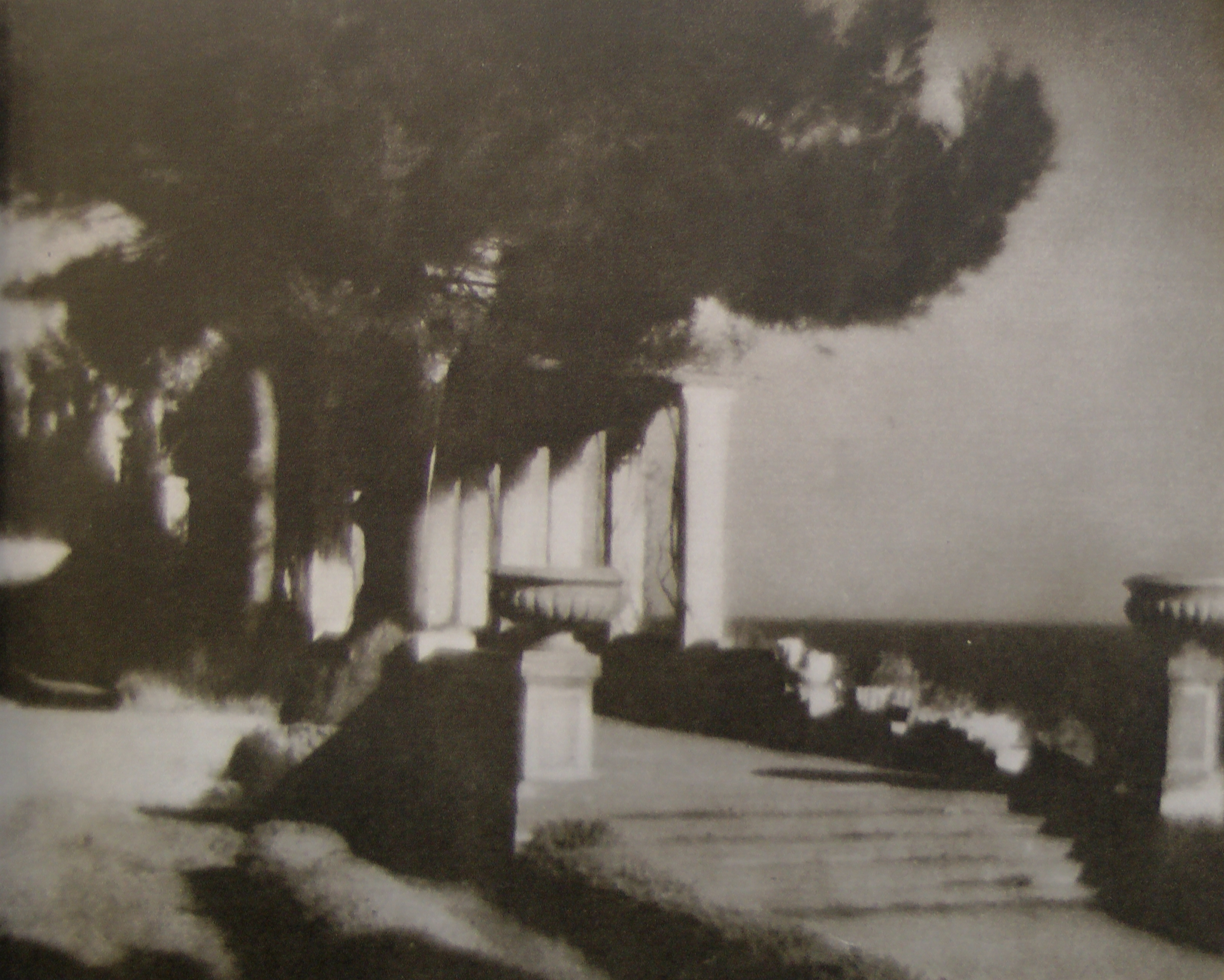
Yuri Eremin. Crimea. Villa on the seashore, 1914

In 1924, Eremin traveled to the Crimea, and from then on the peninsula became a favorite subject in his work. As a member of the photographic section of the All-Union Society for Cultural Relations with Foreign Countries, Eremin regularly sent his works to foreign photo salons and exhibitions. As late as 1928, Eremin took part in seven international exhibitions in Europe and America. In 1926, he became the chairman of the art photography section of the Russian Photographic Society. In 1925–1928, he took part in four Art of Movement exhibitions. In the 1920s, Eremin created cycles of photographs: Russian Estates, Old Moscow, Crimea, Caucasus, and Volga. They were shown at the exhibition Soviet Photography for Ten Years in 1928, where 135 photographs by Eremin were presented. He was awarded the diploma of the 1st degree. The press was highly critical of the exhibition, and publications spoke of "aesthetic counterrevolution" and "artists who take the stand of the bourgeoisie". Both landscapes and nudes by Yuri Eremin were severely criticized. In the article "On 'right-wing' influences in photography" (Soviet Photographic Almanac, 1929), the art critic L. Mezhericher wrote: "I would strongly attribute nude pictures to the legacy of bourgeois pictorial art. This motif turns out to be a favorite of those photographers who are furthest removed from the image of modern reality". In this article, in the list of "right-wing" photographers, Yuri Eremin's name was in fourth place.

Despite criticism, the major Soviet magazines USSR on Construction, Ogoniok, Our Achievements, Thirty Days, and Sovetskoe Foto continued to publish Eremin's photographs in the late 1920s and the first half of the 1930s. In the late 1920s, Eremin traveled to the Volga, the Urals, the Altai, and Central Asia. In 1932, together with Alexander Grinberg, he led the work of enlarging portraits of Lenin and Stalin and images of the largest construction sites of the time to decorate 25-meter high facades of buildings in the center of Moscow for the May Day holiday, for which he was awarded the gratitude of SOYUZPHOTO.

In 1935, at the Exhibition of Masters of Photography each master had the right to exhibit no more than 20 pictures. Eremin's works were criticized for ideological reasons (neutrality, formalism, distortion of national life). At the same time, he was praised in connection with the return to the classics. After the exhibition, three of its participants —Alexander Rodchenko, Anatoly Skurikhin, and Yuri Eremin— were invited to Izvestia for a conversation with its editor-in-chief, Nikolai Bukharin. Rodchenko did not show up for the meeting; he spoke with the party figure the next day. After a two-hour conversation, Bukharin offered Eremin a one-month trip from the newspaper to Dagestan, and then a three-month trip to Svaneti and Armenia. Photographic historian Vladimir Levashov pointed out that the three photographers invited by Bukharin represented different and contradictory trends of the time: Rodchenko was a "left" radical, Skurikhin a representative of documentary photo reportage, and Eremin a "right" conservative.

In 1936, during a discussion on formalism and naturalism in photography, the photographer was again criticized. The main complaint against Eremin was that he "photographed the old life in such a way that the viewer felt sorry for this life and went back in time"; other accusations were a preoccupation with landscape, which allegedly "distracted from Soviet reality", a fascination with Asian exoticism, and a predilection for depicting landowners' estates. The photographer was forced to admit his mistakes and promised to improve.

In 1937, together with 29 other photo correspondents, Eremin traveled along the Moscow Canal. The pictures were presented at an exhibition in the Central House of Journalists. After that, Eremin retired from practical work and devoted his activities to other spheres: A photographic club at the Moscow House of Scientists of the USSR Academy of Sciences (he was its head from 1928 until his death, at different times Eremin led similar circles at the House of Press, at the Trichogornaya Manufactory, at the House of Pioneers, at the Russian Society of Voluntary Air Fleet), selection of negatives for the design of the All-Union Agricultural Exhibition, reviewing the text and selecting illustrations for a book about it. Dr. Olga Sviblova, director of the Moscow House of Photography, wrote about Eremin's photographic work at that time: "Despite... persecution, the masters of Russian pictorial photography continued their creative activity. For example, Yuri Eremin, locked in the bathroom of a huge communal apartment, secretly printed copies of his favorite pictures in microformat. Any one of them could become sufficient evidence for repression". Valery Stigneev claimed that in the late 1930s, Eremin's photographs were not included in print publications or sent to exhibitions.

In December 1944, the photographer sold more than 2,500 negatives of his photographs to the Main Department for the Protection of Monuments in Moscow. The collection was valued at 10,000 rubles. It is currently stored in the Shchusev Museum of Architecture. In 1947, Eremin became a photo correspondent for TASS; according to Valery Stigneev, after the war he served as an inspector for the Main Department for the Protection of Cultural Monuments.

He died of a heart attack in Moscow in 1948. He was buried by the staff of the House of Scientists of the USSR Academy of Sciences.

== Artistic features ==
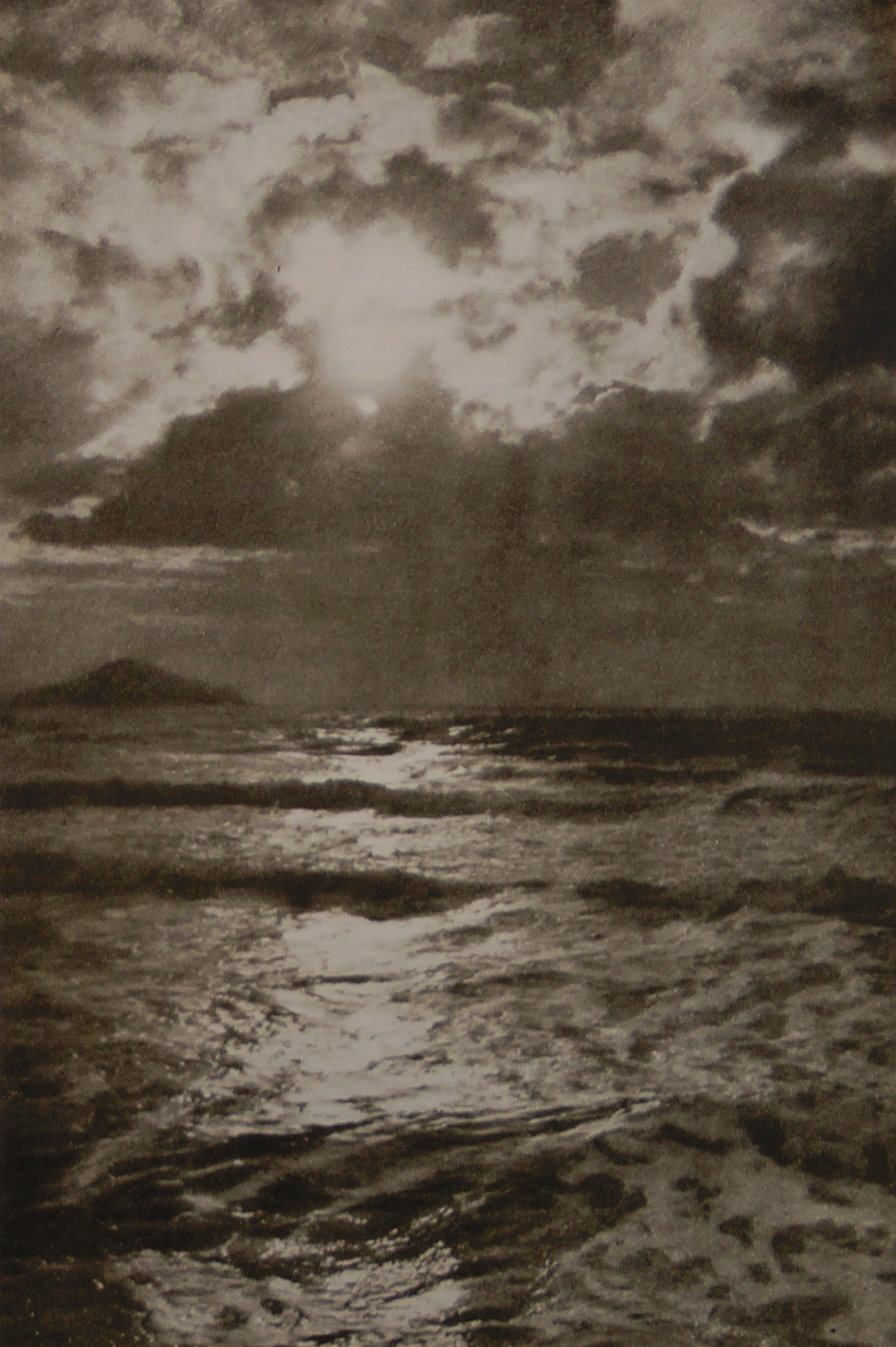
Yuri Eremin. Evening in Bayeux, 1909

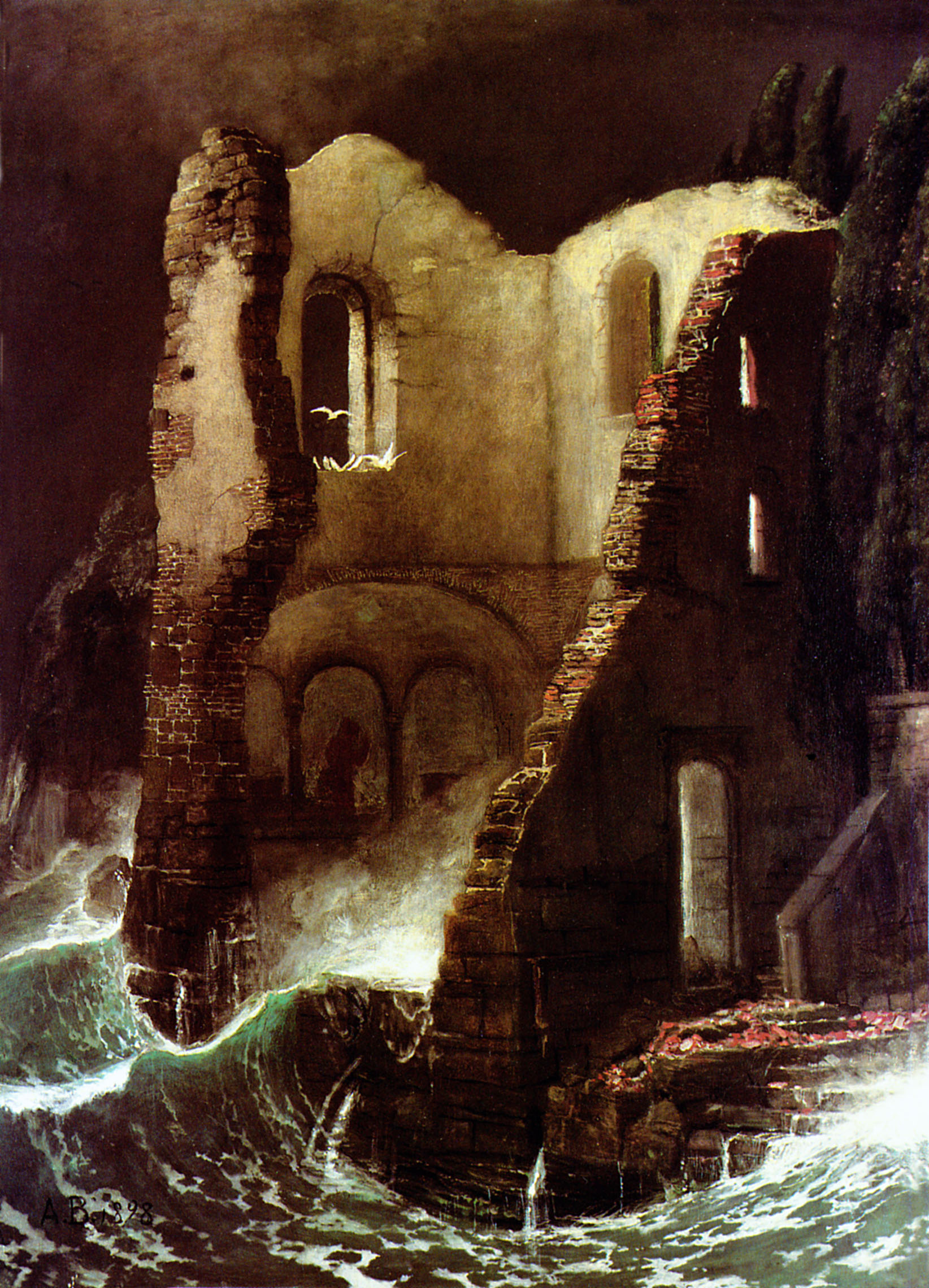
Arnold Böcklin. Chapel, 1898

Unlike many other contemporary photographers, Yuri Eremin did not write any theoretical articles or programmatic manifestos (among the few articles published during his lifetime is On Surrogates in Photography 1935). Kira Dolinina, associate professor at the Faculty of Art History of the European University in St. Petersburg, based on their close acquaintance and participation in the publication of the album Moscow in Berlin in 1926, compared the work of two Russian pictorialists: Alexander Greenberg and Yuri Eremin. In the latter's work, she found similarities with the paintings of Arnold Böcklin and Vasily Vereshchagin as opposed to the neorealism of Greenberg, statics instead of dynamics, "sadness and longing" instead of "iron hand," poetry instead of "stamped step”.

In the 1910s, Eremin worked with generalities: he stopped working with the small details in the photo, that accurately indicated the time and place of the shot, the surroundings, and tried to focus the viewer's attention on the subjective experiences and impressions of the author. According to Fomin, this was his way of fighting against the documentary nature of photography. His work of this period is characterized by moods of sadness and anxiety, he was attracted by the intricate weave of branches, unusual shape of clouds, reflections in mirrors and water surfaces. His photographs were dominated by dark tonality and the contours of the subjects were blurred. Flares or spots of light allowed the photographer to emphasize the main element of the image. In Eremin's pictures, romantic moods prevailed, landscapes were sometimes decorative, and the photographer was fond of techniques that created an abstract, ideal beauty. Fomin called these features of his work decadent. At this time, the photographer was fascinated by the technical side of negative manifestation. He used bromoleum, gum arabic, the "radiant gum arabic" invented by Anatoly Trapani, sputtering.

The mid-1920s marked a turning point in Eremin's work. He began to lean more toward the natural means of expression of photography. This is evidenced by the realistic photographs of architectural monuments in Moscow and the Moscow suburbs that he began to take. Along with the refinement of the frame during printing, he began to work on the construction of the image during the shooting itself. From then on, he paid special attention to natural lighting, linear and tonal perspective. In pictures of architectural monuments, he tried to trace the architect's idea, its relationship with the surrounding nature, the weather on the day of the shooting. The works retained their emotionality but acquired a documentary character. At the same time, they continued to have an intimate and aesthetic character.

Some historians of photography have urged not to exaggerate the changes in the photographer's work. Sergei Morozov, for example, wrote: "Only sometimes his work approaches the new, documentary-reportage approach to photography, they [Yuri Eremin and Sergei Ivanov-Alliluev] generally remained true to themselves: they did not part with their attachment to the picturesque, pictorial photography of the beginning of the century". However, despite his own statement, he later writes in the same book about Eremin's abrupt change of style: "[Eremin] borrows from the rebels the technique of a bold combination of the first and the distant plan. He picks up a watering can with interchangeable lenses. His images take on the freshness of a new vision". At the same time, in an earlier book published in 1955, the same Morozov expressed a completely different point of view. While acknowledging that the photographer was influenced by Impressionism, he argued that even before the revolution". Eremin and Andreev remained realists in their best works. Eremin, although he allowed in landscapes abstraction or stylization under some "invented", "ideal" nature, and understatement sometimes passed in his landscapes in a mystery, — it was a short-lived passion. A passionate tourist who traveled thousands of kilometers with his camera, Eremin could not remain within the narrow confines of "conventional photography" for long. He also claimed that in Soviet times the photographer was able to "decisively overcome decadent influences" and was a consistent realist.

Galina Orlova, a contemporary sociologist, wrote that the Soviet authorities had long perceived Eremin as a person who was unable to "perceive reality through the prism of ideologically arranged knowledge about it. He was therefore declared blind because he had long been unable to see "our wonderful life, our joyful country. After Eremin went to the Moscow-Volga Canal with other masters of photography and took "beautiful, epic photographs," "the political-ophthalmological diagnosis was removed from him. According to Orlova, Yuri Eremin "not only saw the known (the beauty and greatness of the Soviet land) himself, but also made it visible to others". In her opinion, with his photographs, he made it possible "to see the realization of the main goals of the Soviet utopian project — a new man and a transformed reality".

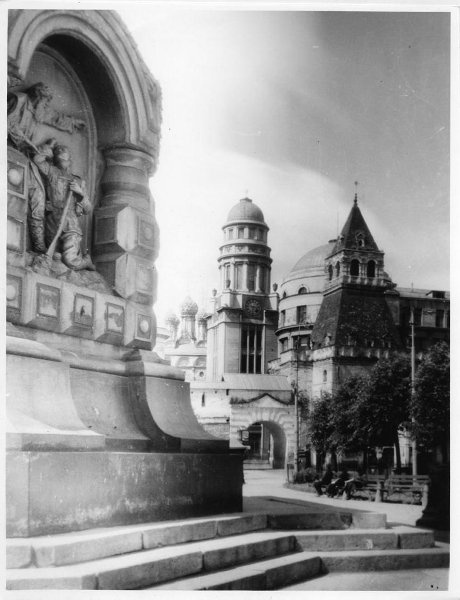
Yury Eremin. View towards Ilyinsky Gates of Kitay-gorod from the monument Plevna Chapel, early 1910s. MAMM / MDF

Anatoly Fomin in his book about Yuri Eremin's work emphasized the following two main themes of his work:

- Architectural monuments: Between 1919 and 1947, the photographer took about 200 pictures of Moscow, many of the monuments he photographed have not survived to this day. He managed to photograph some unique events, such as the flooding of the Moscow River, which rose from its banks to the walls of the Kremlin. He also photographed about 130 estates of the Moscow region (about 2000 negatives). Each time Eremin collected maximum information about the building and the architect who built it, the features of its architectural style, which allowed to create a correct idea of the monument in the public. He familiarized himself with the photographs of his predecessors and the paintings of Russian artists who depicted it. He inspected the building at different times of the day, carefully made a shooting plan and thought about each frame in detail.
- The pictures taken on behalf of the Izvestia editorial staff as the newspaper's photo correspondent in the USSR's national periphery are both views of landscapes and sketches of folk life. Often, the photographer's subject was national handicrafts. These images were usually accompanied by a small text commentary. Valery Stigneev and Valery Valran wrote in their books that this was caused by the beginning of the persecution of pictorial photography: "Eremin tried to fit into the reportage style of the time. However, this attempt failed, his work remained lyrical and poetic, and the Party needed "cheerful collective optimism and propaganda posters". Eremin's work was not successful.

At the same time, Valery Valran and Valery Stigneev noted that Eremin showed himself in all genres of photography: genre painting, nude, (Note: A significant number of Yuri Yeremin's works in the nude genre were published in the album-catalogue Nudes for Stalin. Soviet Photography of the 1920s-1940s.) portrait (still life, marinism)... He was particularly interested in the nude genre, to which he returned periodically: "The nudes in his photographs —chaste and romantic— are masterfully integrated into the landscape and become part of it". According to Valrand, the stylistics of Eremin's work were also diverse — impressionism, symbolism, expressionism, and constructivism. He used a variety of cameras, including a Leica. Eremin shot with a monocle lens and also designed his own lenses. He invented a special photographic enlarger and used various techniques to print positives.

== Famous photographs ==
=== Gurzuf ===
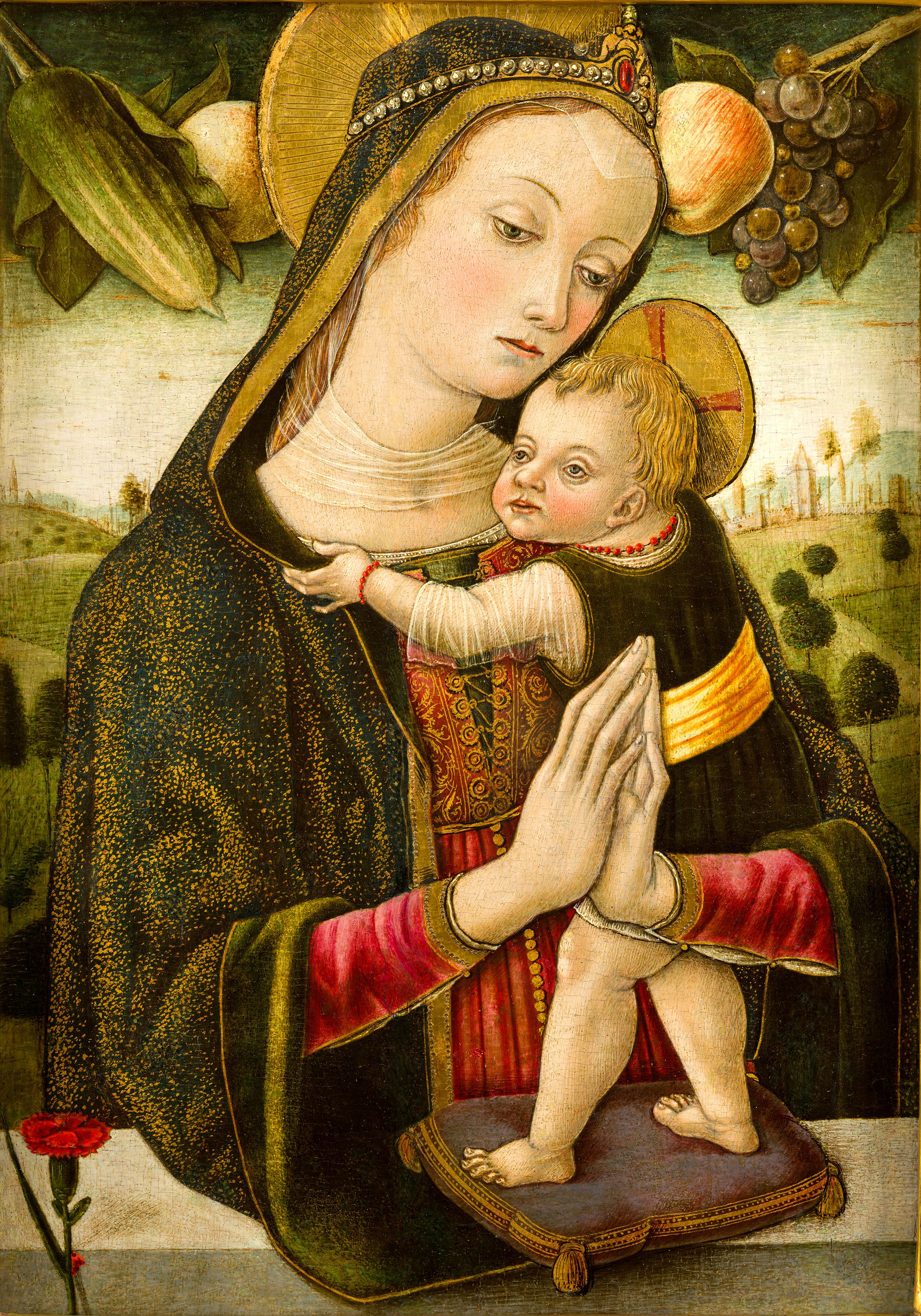
Vittore Crivelli. Madonna and Child, last quarter of the 15th Century (49×35.3 cm, tempera and gilding on wood). Wawel Castle (Inventory No. 7959). The technique used by Jeremin was employed by Renaissance artists

According to Anatoly Fomin, the photograph Gurzuf, taken in 1927, is considered the first in which Eremin departed from his previously familiar pictorialist style. It is one of Eremin's best-known photographs and has been reproduced many times in books on photography. It has also been published as a postcard. According to Fomin, it won a total of about fifty awards at photo exhibitions in different countries at different times. He wrote that this photo became a benchmark of Eremin's artistic style and a classic in the history of Soviet photography. The photo was taken without the stylization of Impressionist paintings. Fomin wrote that the photographer was able to convey "misty air" and "sunlit distance". Eremin placed a branch in the foreground that seems to overhang the viewer's head, gradually leading the eye into the distance, "where the sky and the sea merge in a transparent mist".

Valery Valran, an art historian, artist, and candidate of psychological sciences, wrote differently about the creation of photography. In 1924, the Russian Photographic Society sent Yuri Eremin on a photographic expedition to the Crimea. According to him, it was a moment when Eremin took this picture. A year later, there was an exhibition and discussion of the works of Soviet photographers in the Crimea. Eremin read his report Crimea in Art Photography. According to Valran and Stigneev, the photo Gurzuf was exhibited in 27 countries and received 14 awards. They wrote that the branch in the foreground in Soviet photography "became a kind of stamp", and the technique introduced by the photographer was called the Eremin branch.. He brought to the foreground a certain detail — a column, a branch, or a part of a building, while photographing the architectural scene from a window or through an archway, which became a kind of framing of the scene.

The photographer recalled that fog was not common in Crimea, and he had to wait a long time for such weather to take a picture. When the fog finally came, it lifted so quickly that the photographer had time to take the only picture that turned out to be successful. Eremin's friend G. Y. Artyukhov confirmed that the photographer once saw Gurzuf in the fog by chance, when he did not have a camera with him. After that, Eremin climbed the rock every morning for ten days in order not to miss the moment he needed.

The size of the positive of the photograph Gurzuf — 10 × 14 cm (the mat: 16 × 22 cm). At an auction in Moscow in April 2018, the photograph was offered for bidding for 5000-7000 rubles.

=== Su-Azu Waterfall ===
In 1935, Eremin traveled to the North Caucasus on behalf of the Izvestia editorial staff. He carefully planned his clothing and equipment, made his own tent and sleeping bag, and bought mountaineering boots. On the trip he took a German camera Leica, which was then little known in the USSR. In Dagestan, he was fascinated by scenes from the national life and aulas - anthills. He then visited the Kabardino-Balkarian Autonomous Region. There he focused on pictures of mountain pastures and waterfalls. He was very impressed by the Chegem Gorge and the waterfalls cascading down its cliffs. He wrote: "I photographed one of the Su-Azu waterfall, falling from a dizzying height, and a swirling lake covered with water foam, opening the way for new waterfalls. How much energy there is in this giant! The place is begging for a power plant".

Yuri Eremin has repeatedly admitted that he loved to photograph water:

It is an extremely fertile material for creativity. It can be smooth as a mirror or wrinkled and twisted; it splashes up from the surf and sparkles in the sun; in the mountain stream, it curls into an intricate brown harness; it can reflect the sky, forest and mountains; it can draw dazzling moon and sun paths. By depicting it, you can create wonderfully poetic pictures.

This photo shows a full-frame image of a rock riddled with streams. Thousands of tons of water are falling down. When it hits the sharp protrusions, it turns into tiny drops. According to Anatoly Fomin, "water dust swirls over the rock, creating a white haze. At the bottom of the photo, torrents of whipped foam rage. Fomin wrote that "the viewer almost physically feels the air saturated with moisture and hears the deafening roar of the water", so authentic is the dynamic of the element.

Anatoly Fomin noted that the convincing image of the waterfall is created first of all by a successfully found detail of the landscape. Eremin noticed and managed to capture in his photo the process of "the very atomization of the water cascade, reminiscent of a winter snowstorm". This was the result of the photographer's correct choice of lighting and precise choice of shutter speed.

== Memories and researches ==
Interest in Yuri Eremin's work continued after his death. In 1957, the magazine Sovetskoe Foto published the article "How to prepare for exhibitions": it was a verbatim record of a conversation Eremin had with photographers on March 27, 1946, on the eve of the All-Union Photo Exhibition, recorded by G.Y. Artyukhov, who was present. In 1966 the publishing house Iskusstvo published a book by Anatoly Fomin Photographer Y.P. Eremin. 1881-1948. In the 1970s and 1980s, a number of articles appeared in reputable professional and socio-political publications. In 1982, for example, a new section Masters of Light Painting appeared in the magazine Sovetskoe Foto. The first photographer to receive an article in this section was Yuri Eremin.

In 1998, the Moscow House of Photography, together with the Committee for Culture of the Moscow City Government, held an exhibition of Yuri Eremin's works in Paris, entitled Intimate. In 2014, the Multimedia Art Museum presented a retrospective of the photographer's work to Muscovites. The exhibition was widely covered by the press. Such publications as Izvestia and the weekly Kommersant Weekend devoted articles to it.

Yuri Eremin is a minor character in the novel Horse Dose, published by the Eksmo publishing house and written by Sergei Zverev, who is behind a whole group of contemporary Russian detective writers. The action takes place in Moscow in the 1920s, when Eremin was actually working in the Moscow Criminal Investigation Department.

== Eremin's personality ==
Valery Stigneev, candidate of philosophical sciences, researcher at the State Institute of Art History, author of several books on the history of Russian photographic art of tsarist Russia and the USSR in the 1920s and 1930s, called him "the most colorful (both in life and in his work) personality among photographers" of his era. Little is known about Yuri Eremin's family life. His biographers usually mention only the fact of his marriage in 1909 and his wife's large dowry, which allowed the young man to make six trips to Central and Western Europe in the next five years.

Already during his lifetime Yuri Eremin's personality began to be covered with rumors, myths and legends. He was accused of aesthetics, perceived as a sybarite and epicurean. In his apartment, which was located at the intersection of Stoleshnikov Lane and Petrovka (Eremin lived at 11 Petrovka, apartment 4, phone 3–63–21), meetings of artists, photographers, painters, sculptors and scientists took place. Among his close friends were the physicist Anatoly Mlodzeyevsky and the astronomer Boris Vorontsov-Veliaminov.

=== Eremin as a teacher ===
Eremin's students noticed his teaching method. His lectures were problematic in nature. "In love with life, the enthusiastic Eremin had the ability to ignite others with his inspiration," they said of him. Eremin's classes included lectures, laboratory classes, and field trips not only to the Moscow region, but also tourist trips to the Crimea, the Volga region, and the Caucasus. During these trips, he spoke in detail about each object chosen for photography. Each academic year ended with a creative report — an exhibition of photographic works by the master's students (he himself presented his pictures). After two or three weeks there was a discussion of the exhibited photographs in which everyone took part. Such events served not only to consolidate the friendly relations between the mentor and his students, but also allowed them to learn in an unobtrusive way the style, method, compositional methods and techniques taught by Eremin.

Eremin taught his students to analyze photographs, emphasized the need for a photographer to have "artistic culture," which he understood as knowledge of the theory, history, historiography, and methodology of fine art. The author of the book about Eremin's work, Anatoly Fomin, attended some of the photographer's classes and wrote that he saw in them "people in love with photography, people obsessed with photography, who spend all their free time working in the circle", and quoted the words of Eremin's student Zakhar Vinogradov, who "came to classes as if it were a holiday".

== Bibliography ==
=== Sources and catalogs ===
- Eremin, Yu. P. (1957). Как готовиться к выставкам [How to prepare for exhibitions] (in Russian). Советское фото: журнал. pp. 37–39.
- Eremin, Yu. P. (1935). О суррогатах в фотографии [On photography surrogates] (in Russian). Советское фото: журнал. pp. 13–15.
- Eremin, Yu. P. (1929). Кино-справочник [Movie Guide] (in Russian). М.: Теакинопечать. p. 421.
- Loginov A., Khoroshilov P. V., Grois B. E. (2004). Обнажённые для Сталина. Советская фотография 1920—1940-х годов [Nudes for Stalin. Soviet photography of the 1920s-1940s]. Каталог выставки (in Russian). М.: Пунктум. p. 128. ISBN 978-5-89480-070-7.

=== Non-fiction and researches ===
- Valran, V. (2018). Советская фотография. 1917—1955 [Soviet photography. 1917-1955] (in Russian). М.: Издательство К. Тублина, Мультимедиа Арт Музей. p. 352. ISBN 978-5-8370-0852-8.
- В Мультимедиа Арт Музее соединили пикториализм и модернизм. Фотографические шедевры Юрия Ерёмина и Аркадия Шайхета хорошо дополнили друг друга [The Multimedia Art Museum combined pictorialism and modernism. Photographic masterpieces by Yuri Yeremin and Arkady Shaikhet complemented each other well] (in Russian). Известия: газета. 2014.
- Danilova, I. E. (1984). О композиции картины Кватроченто // Искусство средних веков и Возрождения. Работы разных лет [On the composition of Quatrocento painting // Art of the Middle Ages and Renaissance. Works of different years] (in Russian). М.: Советский художник. pp. 52–64.
- Dolinina, K. (2014). Политическая фотоблизорукость. Выставка Юрия Ерёмина в ММАМ [Political Photoblindness. Yuri Yeremin's exhibition at MMAM] (in Russian). КоммерсантЪ Weekend: еженедельник. pp. 34–35. ISBN 978-5-457-70644-6.
- Konstantinova E.V., Lando S. M., Pleshanov P. A. (2015). Советская фотография начала XX века // История мирового фотоискусства: электронный учебник [Soviet photography of the early XX century // History of World Photography: electronic textbook] (in Russian). СПб.: СПбГИКиТ. pp. 465–506.
- Levashov, V. (2012). Лекции по истории фотографии [Lectures on the photography history] (in Russian). М.: Treemedia. p. 482. ISBN 978-5-903788-16-3.
- Misalandi, Е. (2016). Ерёмин Юрий Петрович // Тихое сопротивление. Русский пикториализм 1900–1930-х гг [Yuri Petrovich Eremin // Quiet Resistance. Russian Pictorialism 1900-1930s.] (in Russian). М.: ГУК г. Москвы «Мультимедийный комплекс актуальных искусств». pp. 185–186. ISBN 978-5-93977-019-4.
- Morozov, S. A. (1986). «Золотой век» светописи настроения // Творческая фотография [“Golden Age” of mood lighting // Artistic Photography] (in Russian). М.: Планета. pp. 125–148.
- Morozov, S. A. (1955). Художественный фотопейзаж // Русская художественная фотография. Очерки из истории фотографии 1839—1917 [Artistic photographic landscape // Russian art photography. Essays from photography history of 1839-1917] (in Russian). М.: Искусство. pp. 145–158.
- Moskvicheva, М. V. (2014). Москве открыли Донского гения [The Don genius was unveiled in Moscow] (in Russian). Московский комсомолец: Газета. p. 7. ISBN 978-5-457-73423-4.
- Orlova, G. (2009). Карты для слепых: политика и политизация зрения в сталинскую эпоху // Визуальная антропология: режимы видимости при социализме [Maps for the Blind: Politics and the Politicization of Vision in the Stalinist Era // Visual Anthropology: Regimes of Visibility under Socialism]. Библиотека Журнала исследований социальной политики (in Russian). М.: Вариант, ЦСПГИ. pp. 57–104. ISBN 978-5903-3602-53.
- Popov, A. P. (2010). Русское фотографическое общество в Москве // Из истории российской фотографии [Russian Photographic Society in Moscow // From the History of Russian Photography] (in Russian). М.: Издательство Московского университета. pp. 38–43.
- Sviblova, O. (2016). Русский фотографический авангард 1920—1930-х годов // Тихое сопротивление. Русский пикториализм 1900–1930-х гг [Russian photographic avant-garde of the 1920s-1930s // Quiet Resistance. Russian Pictorialism of 1900-1930s] (in Russian). М.: ГУК г. Москвы «Мультимедийный комплекс актуальных искусств». pp. 4–5. ISBN 978-5-93977-019-4.
- Stigneev, V. T. (2015). Век фотографии 1894—1994: очерки истории отечественной фотографии [Century of photography 1894-1994: sketches of the history of national photography] (in Russian). М.: Издательский дом «ЛИБРОКОМ». pp. 66–74. ISBN 978-5-397-04665-7.
- Stigneev, V. T. (2016). Зарождение советской фотографии: 1920-е годы [The emergence of Soviet photography: 1920s] (in Russian). М.: ЛЕНАНД. p. 240. ISBN 978-5-9710-2477-4.
- Stigneev, V. T. (2013). Фотохудожник с «Лейкой». Юрий Ерёмин (1881—1948) // От пикториализма к фоторепортажу. Очерки истории отечественной фотографии 1900—1950 (in Russian). М.: Государственный институт искусствознания. Арт Бридж. pp. 66–74. ISBN 978-5-98287-054-4.
- Fomin, A. A. (1966). Фотохудожник Ю. П. Ерёмин. 1881—1948 [Photographer Y. P. Yeremin. 1881-1948] (in Russian). М.: Искусствo. p. 139.
- Chulkov, А. (1998). Его работы крали с выставок [His work was stolen from exhibitions] (in Russian). Огонёк: журнал. p. 17.
- Chulkov, А. (1982). Известный и неизвестный Ерёмин [Known and unknown Eremin] (in Russian). Советское фото: журнал. pp. 34–38.
- Chulkov, А. (2000). Светопись Юрия Ерёмина [Light painting by Yuri Eremin] (in Russian). Наше наследие: журнал. pp. 132–139.

=== Fiction ===
- Zverev, S. (2016). Лошадиная доза [A horse dose] (in Russian). М.: Эксмо. p. 184. ISBN 978-5699-9185-22.
