= Sovfoto =

Soviet photo agency in America

Sovfoto was established in 1932 as the only agency to represent Soviet photojournalism in America. It continues today as a commercial entity Sovfoto/Eastfoto. Collections from its archive are held also at MacLaren Art Centre in Barrie, Canada which in 2001 was donated 23,116 vintage gelatin silver prints dating from 1936 to 1957, while University of Massachusetts Amherst holds the Tass Sovfoto Photograph Collection, 1919–1963, the majority being from 1943–1963.

== Establishment ==
Sovfoto agency was originally established by the USSR in New York in the early 1930s to distribute Soviet press photography throughout North America.

== Clientele ==
All were printed, and often retouched, in the USSR with English captions as they were intended for a North American audience. Associated Press and International New Services and other major wire agencies paid a subscription fee to license the material, and offered it to illustrated magazines like Life, Time and Newsweek and Look, to newspapers, school textbook publishers, and also to communist-aligned and communist-sympathetic publications, as well as selling to the State Department and various branches of the Armed Forces as the only source of regular visual reportage on the Soviet Union.

Three Sovfoto pictures appeared (credited to the agency) in MoMA's 1955 exhibition curated by Edward Steichen, The Family of Man. Sponsored by America's own propaganda unit the United States Information Agency, it toured the world and was attended by 9 million visitors. It was included in the Moscow trade fair at Sokolniki Park, the scene of Soviet Premier Nikita Khrushchev and United States Vice President Richard Nixon's 'Kitchen Debate' over the relative merits of communism and capitalism.

== New York office ==
After World War II, Sovfoto continued, adding imagery from Eastern European countries of the Communist bloc as well as China. The agency started doing business as Sovfoto/Eastfoto in the late 1940s, moving offices several times under a series of American owners, including Helen Black (at 11 West Forty-second Street, New York City 18, then 15 West 44th Street) up to 1952, Edwin S. Smith to 1964 (at 24 West 45th Street), then Liuba Solov at 25 West 43rd Street. Solov managed the business until 1974 when Leah Siegel took ownership, moving in 1987 to 225 West 34th Street Suite 1505, and employing Victoria Edwards who bought the company in the early 1990s. Edwards’ son Vanya took over upon her retirement and is the current owner/manager.

== McCarthy-era suspicions ==
As a Communist bloc agency, Sovfoto came under suspicion during the McCarthy era. When Sovfoto released photographs of purported biological warfare committed by the Americans, the then-owner Edwin Smith was brought before the House Un-American Activities Committee to testify on his role in their publication. At the time of his ownership as ‘Foreign Principal’, the Report of the Attorney General to the Congress of the United States on the Administration of the Foreign Agents Registration Act of 1938 as Amended June 1951, for the Calendar Year 1955, notes that ‘Propaganda photographs (for the U.S.S.R.) are distributed by Edwin S. Smith, doing business under the name of Sovfoto Agency’ as well as ‘propaganda material from Communist China’. Smith (1891–1975) was owner and manager of Am-Rus Literary and Music Agency, also Sovfoto and Eastfoto Agency from 1952–64, and represented legations and press and photo agencies Mezhdunarodnaja Kniga, Moscow; Czechopress, Prague; China Photo Service, Peking; Agerpress, Bucharest; Zentral Bild, East Berlin; Hungarian Review Photo Service (formerly Hungarian Bulletin), Budapest; Legation of the Hungarian People's Republic; Czechoslovak Embassy; Legation of the People's Republic of Rumania; Polish Embassy; Czechoslovak Life, Prague; Cartimex (previously Centrul de Librarii Si Difuzare a Cartii "IMEX"), Bucharest; and Artia, Prague. The agency received $40,872.75 from sale of photographs in 1955.

== Current operation ==
Until the fall of the Communist/Soviet bloc, Sovfoto remained the exclusive legitimate source of news photography from the Communist countries and it continues to represent ITAR-TASS in Russia and Xinhua in China and others, while maintaining the historical archive. The Agency continues to operate from 263 West 20th St. #3 New York 10011 under the management of Vanya Edwards.

== Archive ==
The Sovfoto archive holds the largest collection of photographs of Stalinist USSR outside of the state archives in Moscow. Furthermore, it includes images of Russia from the time of the Tsars, through Lenin, Stalin, Khrushchev, Gorbachev, and Yeltsin, World War II and Militaria, the space program, and a wide range of areas from Soviet society. Dr. Margarita Tupitsyn, curator and author of The Soviet Photograph, 1924–1937 wrote:

"The Sovfoto archive is of unquestionable status....Many of the photographs stand out as artistically remarkable and strong images as well as documentation of the human experience... The Sovfoto archive presents a visual depository for rich interdisciplinary studies, including photography, sociology, psychology and history...The annotations on the back of each photograph further enables the researcher to delve into invaluable historical layers of knowledge that would require a long time to find in other sources...The Sovfoto archive is the only one of its kind in North America."

For anthropologists, for example, the archive provides visual evidence; in Ruth Benedict's study 'Child rearing in Eastern European Countries,' Sovfoto imagery showed the prevalence of swaddling.

The Sovfoto photographs present the state-sanctioned, propagandistic promotion of the progress and achievements of communism. In 1950 Newsweek generated controversy around a Sovfoto picture of 70-year old Prime Minister Stalin casting his ballot for the March 12 Soviet elections; they showed that a head shot of Stalin from years before had been 'simply pasted' into the news photo. Conversely, in 1956, Stewart Alsop in The Courier-Journal demonstrated how reliable information on Soviet weapons programs could be obtained from Sovfoto images. The magazine Aviation Week was called to The Pentagon for publishing 'top secret' photographs of flights over Moscow by the new Soviet heavy bomber, the Bison, the existence of which had been denied as 'fake' by Secretary of Defense Charles E. Wilson, to which charge the Aviation Week editor protested that they had simply obtained the pictures from Sovfoto.

Nevertheless, they also constitute historical record. When Lillian Hellman was writing the screenplay for The North Star she relied on Sovfoto location pictures for the recreation of Ukrainian cooperative Kamenetz Podolsk.

At the outbreak of World War II, many Soviet photographers became war correspondents, incorporating the photographic invention of the revolutionary avant-garde in documenting the lives and deaths of Soviet troops, conflict, destruction and German atrocities. Sovfoto coverage of the Red Army's advance produced by Russian photographers turned war correspondents arrived at Associated Press offices in New York by radio from Moscow as early as August 1944. These were the first evidence of the Holocaust; one showing residents of Lublin surrounding a pit filled with bodies of those killed by the Germans who occupied the city; another, according to the Sovfoto caption accompanying it, showed: "The Lublin camp of annihilation. In their well-built cremation ovens, the Hitlerites daily burnt the bodies of those whom they tortured to death in the camp." During the Korean War, Eastfoto images of American POW's distributed by Sovfoto led to the identification of at least two of the US combatants pictured.

== The photographers ==
The archive contains images taken by many anonymous photographers, as well as foremost Soviet photographers, documenting a period of history in the twentieth century which has had a very lasting impact. After the crackdown of 1932, many of the Soviet Union's leading avant-garde photographers found that their only available means of expression was press photography. The Sovfoto archive includes images from many Soviet photographers who have become historically important:

Photographer	birth	death	work	
Max Alpert (Maks Al'pert)	1899	1980	for "Pravda", made portraits of major Soviet and many foreign politicians, military and writers; during the Great Patriotic War was a TASS correspondent and Information Bureau in the rear and at the front, in a combat situation. His most famous photograph "Combat" became a symbol of the Soviet war. Postwar years contributed to various publications and was the lead photographer for the press agency "Novosti".	
Dmitri Baltermans	1912	1990	official Kremlin photographer, worked for Izvestia, picture editor of Ogonyok; in World War II, covered the Battle of Stalingrad, and the battles of the Red Army in Russia and Ukraine. Twice wounded."Grief", depicts village women as they search for the bodies of their relatives after a 1942 Nazi massacre of the civilians near the Crimean city of Kerch.	Dmitri Baltermants (1942 ) Grief
D. Samson Cernov	1887	1929	Balkan War and World War I 1912–18, Serbian Retreat.	
Mark Markov-Grinberg	1907	2006	first worked on Sovyetski Yug ('Soviet South') 1925, freelancer for Ogonyok, then in Moscow, on numerous trade union newspapers.	
Samary Mikhailovitch Gurary (Samarii Gurarii)	1916	1998	portrait of Stalin, Roosevelt and Churchill at the Yalta Conference appeared on the front page of Pravda 13 Feb 1945	
Boris Vsevolodovich Ignatovich	1889	1976	press photographer on Bednota, appears in Sovetskoe Foto, Sovremennaia arkhitektura, Radioslushatel and Illiustrirovannaia rabochaia gazeta. Cinematographer during 1930s. In WW2, Western and Bryansk fronts, Potsdam Declaration, military photographer until 1950 then worked for Ogoniok, Pravda, Izogiz, Stroiizdat, and Zhurnal mod.	
Yevgeny Khaldei	1917	1997	Dnieper Dam project and its worker hero Alexey Stakhanov, covered World War II throughout, including "Victory Banner over the Reichstag", liberation of Sevastopol, the storming of Novorossiysk, Potsdam Conference, Nuremberg trials	
Oleg Knorring	1907	1968	contributor to magazine Наши достижения ('Our achievements'), and other publications and during World War II for newspaper Red Star.	Oleg Knorring (1 November 1941).Western front. Gunner comrade Kravchenko fires at enemy tanks. Red Star.
Nikolai Dzhemsovich Kolli (not to be confused with Nikolai Kolli, architect)	1894	1966	USSR in Construction	
Vladimir Musinov			Vladimir Musinov authorised to photograph Stalin, in Moscow and travelling from Vladivostok to Middle Asia via the Arctic from 1941 to 1942. LIFE 29 Mar 1943 (p. 114) special edition on Russia, and in an article in the 11 Jan 1943 edition. Apprentice master to Dmitri Baltermans.	
Vladimir Savostyanov	1903	?	J. Nehru and I. Gandhi in Moscow metro, 1955; Shah of Iran Mohammed Reza Pahlavi and Soraya Pahlavi at Exhibition of Economic Achievements, Moscow, 1956	
Arkady Shaikhet	1898	1959	worked on Ogonyok, a founder of Soviet Photo in 1926, contributed to USSR in Construction, in WW2 Battle of Stalingrad, liberation of Kiev, Ukraine.	
Shakhovskoy			work was collected by Philippe Halsman	
Major David Sholomovich			cameraman for the Moscow Newsreel Studios, he mastered the duties of gunner and navigator in order to fly to record the dive-bombing and strafing of Nazi troops by Soviet planes.	
Abram Petrowitch Shterenberg (or Sterenberg)	1894	1979	As a soldier he attended a school of art and design, worked in Red Army photographic department. Postwar in B. Kapustianskii’s photo atelier in Tashkent, Uzbekistan. Professional photographer in Moscow and was active there as a photojournalist and portraitist, contributed to exhibition “Ten Years of Soviet Photography”, mostly portraits.	
Viktor Antonovich Temin	1908	1987	from 1922 worked for Izvestia, photographing Maxim Gorky in 1929, expedition to the North Pole in 1930, Russian-Finnish War (1939–40), RIA Novosti in WWII, photographing the Battle of Moscow	
Alexander Uzylan	1908	198?	staff photographer for Izvestia, Pravda and Ogoniok magazine. During the Second World War, assigned to the Black Sea Fleet as correspondent for the Soviet information Bureau.	
Alexander Vorontsov	1919	1991	photographs and film of rescue of children at the liberation of the Auschwitz-Birkenau camp by the Red Army, January 27, 1945	
Boris Borisovich Zeitlin (a.k.a. Tseitlin)			"a fearless and indefatigable film-photographer."	
George Anatolievich 'Zelma' Zelmanovich	1906	1984	photojournalist on Izvestia, Ogonyok, Red Star 1920s and 30s; military photographer on "Izvestia" newspaper at the front in Moldavia, Odessa and Ukraine particularly during Battle of Stalingrad. After WW2, worked for "Ogonyok" magazine, and from 1962 for the agency "Novosti".	
