= Senbu =

Japanese psychological warfare operations

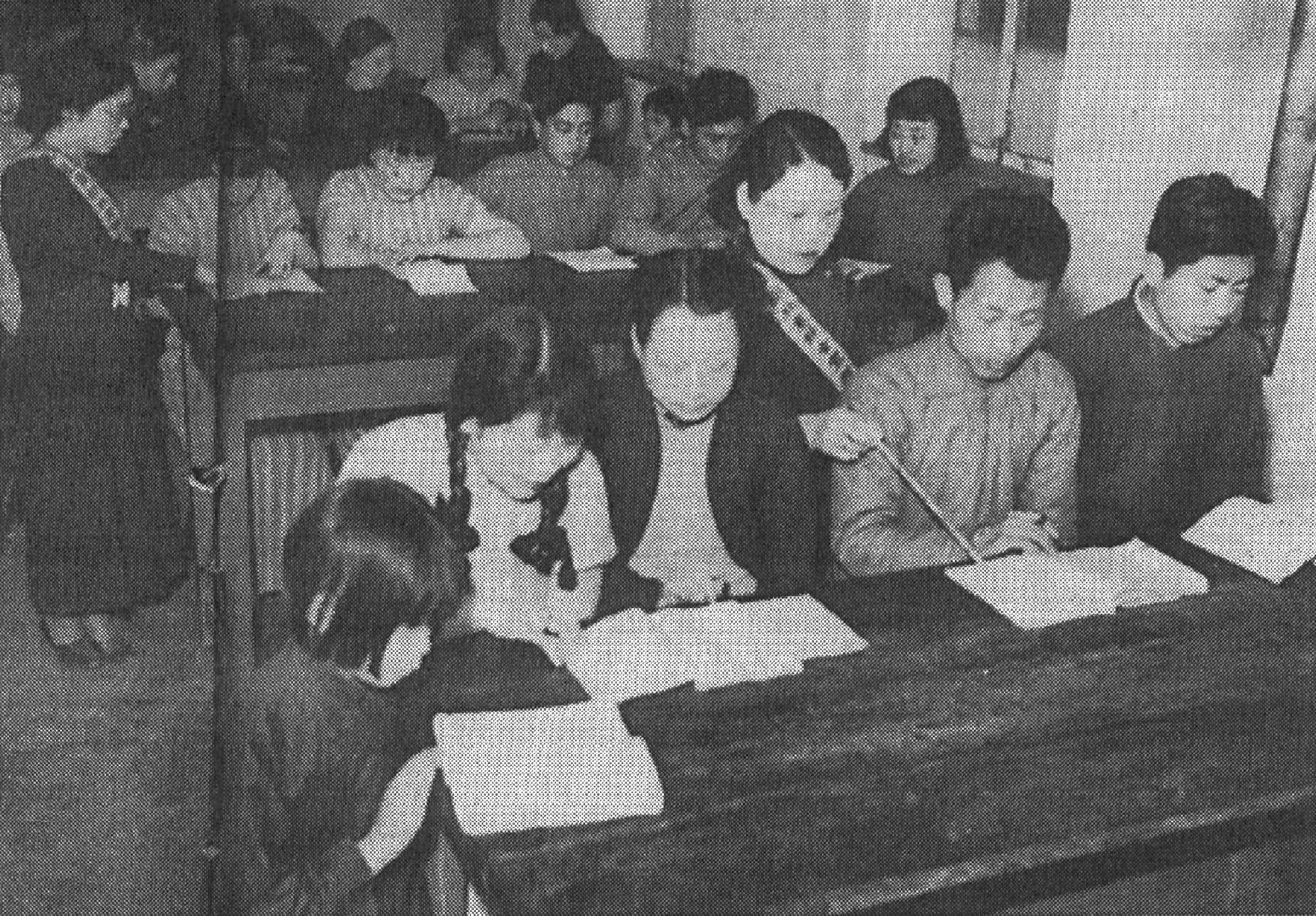
A Japanese language school in Beijing with courses taught by female senbu operatives, c. 1938.

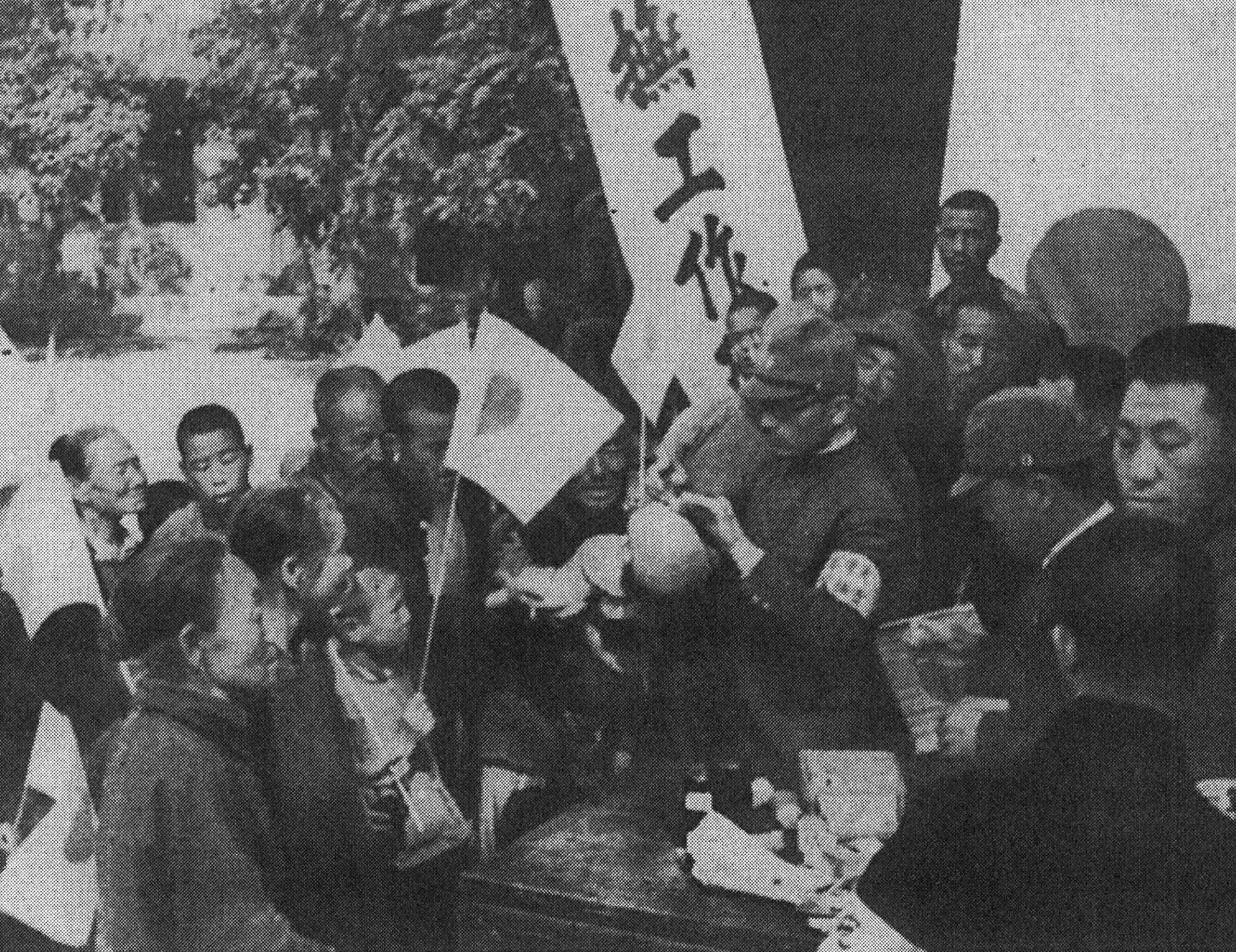
A senbu medical team (施療班, seryōhan) providing free medical treatment to Chinese civilians, c. 1938. The banner in the background reads "senbu project" (宣撫工作, senbu kōsaku).

The term senbu (宣撫) was used by the Imperial Japanese Army to refer to psychological warfare operations intended to pacify local populations and accelerate the process of Japanization.

== Summary ==
The first senbu team was organized in 1932 by Yaginuma Takeshi (1895–1944), a civilian employed by the Kwantung Army, as part of the preparations for the Battle of Rehe. The term comes from the xuanfushi (宣撫使) envoys dispatched in ancient times by Chinese states to maintain control over regions destabilized by war.

Remnants of defeated Chinese armies frequently broke apart into marauding gangs of honghuzi who terrorized the rural population. This, combined with reports of violence against civilians by Japanese forces as well as the general chaos that followed the fires of war, contributed to panic and brought about a collapse of functioning society as masses of civilians fled to urban areas where they could expect protection by garrisoned Japanese troops. According to the scorched earth policy (jianbi qingye, 堅壁清野) of the National Revolutionary Army, retreating Chinese forces routinely destroyed the homes, property, and food supplies of local people. It was not uncommon for Chinese soldiers to simply murder locals in order to prevent them from assisting the Japanese.

In the aftermath of this, senbu teams following the main Japanese force would, through the distribution of humanitarian aid and the implementation of Japanese-funded social development projects, attempt to win the hearts and minds of the populace while also restoring the economic strength and social cohesion of society. By building a relationship of trust with the local people, the senbu projects also had the effect of gaining their voluntary cooperation, including the provision of labor and human intelligence. Continuing to fight a different kind of battle after the shooting had stopped, senbu operatives were praised as "soldiers without weapons" (武器なき戦士). Athletic events were also organized to improve relations with locals.

By restoring the fabric of society, the self-defense ability of rural settlements from bandit raids would be improved. This allowed citizens to better protect themselves from loss of life or property, and at the same time cut the bandits off from their rapport with the apathetic and poorly-educated Chinese populace, who had long since become accustomed to their presence, and their supply of food, "thus bringing about [their] self-annihilation ...".

Senbu operatives operated as forestry and logging supervisors to ensure Chinese guerillas could not hide in densely forested areas. Teams were also deployed to uncover and wipe out cells of Communists, arrest Soviet military spies, and infiltrate the Chinese Communist Party in order to make arrests and assassinations.

According to senbu progenitor Yaginuma Takeshi, "[The principles of] senbu ought to apply also to our Imperial Army. We must reform our own soldiers who behave cruelly toward the Chinese before [it will be possible for us to] reform the Chinese themselves" (大日本軍宣撫官とは大日本軍に対する宣撫官という意味でもあるのだろう。我々は支那人自身を善導する前に、支那人に粗暴に振舞う日本の軍人をまず教育せねばならない).

"Tōhikō" (討匪行; "Setting Out to Strike Down the Wicked"), a gunka describing a senbu team's exploits against Chinese communists in the Khingan Mountains, was commissioned by the Kwantung Army. The lyrics were written by Yaginuma Takeshi and it was recorded by Fujiwara Yoshie.

== The scope of senbu operations ==
The scope and objective of senbu operations were summarized as:

- stabilization and reassurance of the public psyche
- restoration and maintenance of social order
- eradication of communist and anti-Japanese ideologies
- supervision in the development of local industry, economy, transportation, and culture
- cooperation with local authorities in the establishment of a "sound" (i.e. pro-Japanese) government in China

== See also ==
- Front (Japanese magazine)
- Manchuria–Mongolia problem
- Pacification of Manchukuo
- Perception management
- Social engineering (political science)
- Three Girls Revitalizing Asia
- White propaganda
