= Maria Osten =

Soviet writer (1908–1942)

Maria Osten (born Maria Emilie Alwine Gresshöner; March 20, 1908 – August 8, 1942) was a German and Soviet journalist.

She was born in Lemgo, Germany, but grew up in East Prussia. She took a pen name, Osten (German for "East") to indicate her pro-Soviet sympathies.

== Biography ==
Osten was born Maria Emilie Alwine Gresshöner in Muckum bei Bünde, Westphalia, Germany, the daughter of Anna Maria (Pohlmann) and Heinrich Gresshöner. Her 1935 book Hubert in Wonderland is about her adoption, with Pravda journalist Mikhail Koltsov, of a 12-year-old boy who was the son of a German Communist from the Saar region of Germany. They took the boy to the Soviet Union in 1935; his arrival there was highly publicized, as it was considered a demonstration of the cooperation of fellow Communists to save a young boy from having to grow up in Nazi Germany. The boy was toured all around the country and taken to visit Marshals Mikhail Tukhachevsky and Semyon Budyonny in the Kremlin.

The family's fate, however, changed, when Joseph Stalin began to purge the party ranks. Koltsov was arrested in December 1938 following a denunciation filed by André Marty and executed about a year later, and the book disappeared from circulation. Hubert then refused to recognize his adoptive parents and told his adoptive mother to leave him. In 1941, Osten was arrested in the hotel Balchug; she was executed in Saratov prison on September 16, 1942.

Hubert was deported to the Kazakh SSR, where he became a shepherd. He was arrested in 1946 and freed only in 1955, two years after Stalin's death. He tried to return to Germany, but was unable to, dying in 1959 in a hospital in Simferopol after a poorly-performed operation for appendicitis.
