= Arkady Shaikhet =

Soviet photographer (1898–1959)

- Born: Avrom Shmulevitch; 12 September 1898; Nikolayev, Kherson Governorate, Russian Empire
- Died: 18 November 1959 (aged 61); Moscow, USSR
- Known for: photography, photojournalism

Arkady Samoylovich Shaikhet (Russian: Аркадий Самойлович Шайхет; 12 September 1898 – 18 November 1959) was a prominent Soviet photojournalist and photographer. In the history of Soviet photography, Shaikhet is known for a type of journalistic photography called "artistic reportage," and for photographs of industrialization in the 1920s and 1930s.

His first photographs were published in 1923 and in 1924 he joined the staff of the national magazine Ogonyok. His images were used for their covers from the magazine's first issue. Shaikhet was one of the founders (together with journalist Mikhail Koltsov) of Soviet Photo in 1926. Starting in 1930 he contributed to USSR in Construction, another Soviet journal.

During the Second World War he created a series of images of the Battle of Stalingrad and later of liberation of Kiev, Ukraine.

The Sovfoto agency, which from 1932 distributed Soviet photography in the West, holds examples of his photojournalism.

== Biography ==
Born on August 28 (September 9), 1898 in Mykolajiv (now Ukraine) into a poor Jewish family: his father sold draft beer, his mother ran a small sewing workshop.

Graduated from 4th grade of primary school. He was unable to enter the gymnasium due to the educational qualifications for his father that were formed in those years, so he began working as a mechanic’s assistant at the Nikolaev Shipyard.

During the Civil War he served in the Red Army in a brass band. During his service he suffered from severe typhus with heart complications.

== Awards ==
- Order of the Red Banner (19.5.1944)
- Order of the Patriotic War (20.9.1945; was nominated for the Order of the Red Star)
- Medal "For the Defence of Moscow"
- Medal "For the Defence of Stalingrad"
- Medal "For the Capture of Berlin"
- Medal "For the Victory over Germany in the Great Patriotic War 1941–1945"

== Exhibitions ==
- 2012, Arkadiy Shaikhet, Continuation 1928-1931, Multimedia Art Museum, Moscow
- 2014 — “Arkady Shaikhet. Photographs 1932-1941" Multimedia Art Museum, Moscow.
- 11.III—10.IV.2016 — “Arkady Shaikhet. 1945-1959. Episode 4” Multimedia Art Museum, Moscow.
