= Yevgenia Feigenberg =

Soviet editor

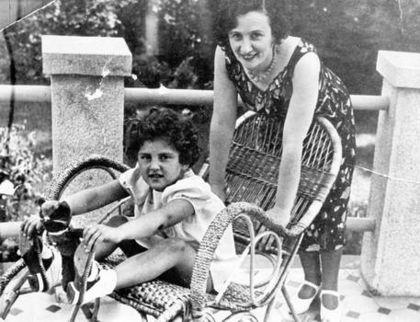
- Feigenberg with her daughter Natalia, whom she and Yezhov adopted
- Other names: Yevgenia Solomonovna Khayutina; Yevgenia Khayutina-Gladun; Yevgenia Khayutina-Yezhova; Yevgenia Gladun-Yezhova; Yevgenia Yezhova

Yevgenia Feigenberg (Russian: Евгения Фейгенберг), also known as Yevgenia Solomonovna Khayutina (Russian: Евгения Соломоновна Хаютина; 1904, Gomel – November 21, 1938, Moscow) was a Soviet editor, host of a literary salon, and the last wife of Nikolai Yezhov.

== Biography ==
Born in Gomel in 1904, she was the youngest child in a large Jewish merchant family of Solomon (Zalman) Leibovich Feigenberg and Esfiri Mikhailovna (Meilakhovna), née Krymskaya. She married for the first time at the age of 17 to Lazar Khayutin (1898-1948), with whom she moved in 1921 to Odessa, where she worked in the editorial office of the local magazine. During this period, she met Odessa writers Valentin Kataev, Yury Olesha, and Isaac Babel.

She married a second time to the former Red commander, Alexander Fedorovich Gladun, whom she met during one of his business trips to Odessa while serving as director of the Moscow publishing house “Economic Life”. She moved to Moscow with him in 1924.

In 1927, she accompanied Gladun when he was sent on diplomatic assignment in London as the second secretary of the USSR embassy in Great Britain. When Gladun was recalled to Moscow due to a spy scandal Yevgenia was sent to Berlin, where she worked as a typist at the Soviet trade mission. During this time she became intimately involved with the writer Isaac Babel. She returned to Moscow at the end of 1928.

She met Nikolai Yezhov at a sanatorium in Sochi in September 1929. They married in 1931.

In addition to working at the newspaper “Gudok”, she also worked on the “Peasant Newspaper” and as editor of the magazine USSR in Construction. By 1938 the editorial board members of the magazine were being arrested by the police and disappearing from the journal's masthead.

Her Moscow apartment and dacha hosted literary and musical evenings, which were attended by famous writers and cultural figures: the authors Isaak Babel, Mikhail Sholokhov, and Mikhail Koltsov, the filmmaker Sergei Eisenstein, the comedian and jazz musician Leonid Utesov, as well as General Semyon Uritsky and members of the Soviet nomenklatura.

Feigenberg's activities did not go unnoticed by Stalin, who twice told Yezhov about the need to divorce his wife. When challenged by Stalin, Nikolai first tried to rid of people who posed problems related to his wife, but then he became angry when he learned that Feigenberg had spent time with her fellow editor, Mikhail Sholokhov.

Feigenberg’s mental health started to deteriorate in 1938, and in October of that year she was admitted to the Vorovsky Nerve Clinic. On November 19, 1938 she died, and her death was described as possibly a suicide. She was 34 years old.

== Personal life ==
The Yezhovs did not have any children of their own, and in 1933 they adopted a five-month-old girl, Natalya, from an orphanage.
