= Mark Redkin =

Soviet photographer

- Born: Missing required parameter 1=month! 1908; Astrakhan, Russian Empire
- Died: 1987 (aged 78–79); Moscow, USSR
- Known for: photography, photojournalism

Mark Stepanovich Redkin (Russian: Марк Степанович Редькин; 1908 – 1987) was a Soviet photographer.

He worked for the Kommunist (1928–1932) and later for the TASS. During World War II he was correspondent of Krasnaia Zvezda and covered many important events, from Soviet invasion of Poland in 1939 to the fall of Berlin and surrender of Japan in 1945. Later he worked for the Planeta publishing house.

Redkin is renowned for his participation in two separate around-the-world expeditions, the first of which took place in 1933 and the second in 1961.

== Biography ==
Mark Stepanovich Redkin was born in 1908 in the oldest economic and cultural center of the Nizhny Volga and Caspian region, the city of Astrakhan, in the family of a professional sailor Stepan Nazarovich Redkin, which largely predetermined his fate, in which the water element occupied a firm place. From an early age, he went with his father to fish in the Caspian Sea.

In the evenings, hereditary fishermen gathered in the parental home, among whom two father's brothers talked about the Volga and the sea, which formed Redkin's romantic worldview.

In the early years of industrialization, Mark joined a shipyard as an electric welder. The father gave his son a "Fochtländer" camera, with which Redkin took his first picture through a close-up of the propeller of the workers repairing the tug, and took it to the city newspaper "Kommunist" to the illustration department artist S.A. Ryabikov. The next day, the picture appeared in the newspaper on the front page.

At the same time, he met A. S. Shaikhet, who taught him the skill of shooting against the sun, this acquaintance grew into a long-term friendship.

The Astrakhan Art Gallery had a great influence on Redkin, in which he studied the work of G. G. Nissky, from whom he borrowed the scale of the epic landscape, and J. D. Romas.

In 1929, the factory committee of the Komsomol was sent to study at the Leningrad Phototechnical School, from which he graduated in 1932. Without leaving photojournalism, he worked as a welder at the Kanonersky plant in the Leningrad port on the reconstruction of the Aleut ship, on which he later went on a round-the-world ocean voyage for whale fishing across the Atlantic to Cuba, Jamaica, Costa Rica through the Hawaiian Islands to Japan and Vladivostok. This journey was reflected in the illustrations for the book by Professor B. A. Zenkovich “Around the World for Whales”.

After returning to his homeland in 1933, Redkin was called up for military service in Morflot in the Leningrad border detachment, where he became a correspondent-chronicler of his unit, the pictures taken there became his hallmark for receiving an invitation to work in the Krasnaya Zvezda newspaper. During this period, he became interested in photo windows, considering them the best expression of reportage. Working in the newspaper, Redkin participated in the campaigns of military courts, sailed on cruisers, destroyers, battleships, at the same time filmed combined arms exercises, parades, maneuvers; flew on military aircraft and balloons, took memoirs of famous people: K. E. Voroshilov, A. A. Zhdanov, N. G. Kuznetsova.

During his service in the "Red Star", he went for a walk on the sailing ship "Vega", where he filmed a crew consisting of student sailors at work, later he went to the commercial ships of Minrybhoz in the Barents Sea, from where he brought pictures of "Encounter in the Fog" (seagulls, filmed through the sea mist, the picture was awarded a gold medal at the exhibition of sailors in Bordeaux) and "Storm" (a silver medal at the exhibition in Buenos Aires). On the Baltflote, he photographed the famous cocker Nikolai Trushkin, who became one of the prototypes of Vasiliy Terkin; communicated with aviators, filmed M. M. Gromova, A. B. Yumasheva, S. A. Danilina.

== Awards and titles ==
- Order of the Red Star
- Order of the Patriotic War
- Medal "For the Victory over Germany in the Great Patriotic War 1941–1945"
- Honoured Cultural Worker of the RSFSR

== Publications ==
- Redkin, M. (1978). Избранные фотографии: Альбом (Featured Photos: Album). Auth. text Zaborsky, M.A. Moscow: Planet. (in Russian)

=== Articles ===
- Redkin, Mark (1987). "First peaceful frame". Sovetskoye Foto: 36.

== Exhibitions ==
- 1959-1966 — All-Union Exhibition of Art Photography "Seven-Year Plan in Action", "Our Youth"
- 1964 — World Press Photo-64
- 1969 — «ТАСС ФОТО-69»
- 1970-1976 — Annual foreign exhibition "USSR: country and people in artistic photographs"
- 1978 — Personal exhibition dedicated to the 70th anniversary (Astrakhan)

== See also ==
- Eastern Front
