= Dmitry Baltermants =

Soviet photojournalist

Dmitri Baltermants
- Born: 13 May 1912; Warsaw, Congress Poland, Russian Empire
- Died: 11 June 1990 (aged 78)
- Education: Moscow State University
- Occupation: Photographer

Dmitri Baltermants (Russian: Дмитрий Николаевич Бальтерманц; 13 May 1912 – 11 June 1990) was a prominent Soviet photojournalist.

== Early life ==
Baltermants was born on 13 May 1912 in Warsaw, then in Congress Poland, Russian Empire. His father served in the Imperial Russian Army and was killed in the First World War.

Baltermants graduated from the Moscow State University.

== Career ==
Baltermants planned to become a math teacher in a Military Academy, but he fell in love with photography and began a career in the field of photojournalism in 1939. Apprenticed to Vladimir Musinov, he became an official Kremlin photographer, worked for the daily Izvestia and was picture editor of the popular magazine Ogonyok.

During World War II, Baltermants covered the battle of Stalingrad, and the battles of the Red Army in Russia and Ukraine. He was twice wounded.

Just like his fellow photographers covering the Red Army during the war, Baltermants' images were censored by Soviet authorities because of irritating perspectives or works that otherwise weren't likely to boost morale. Some of his most captivating photos were suppressed, and became public much later, in the 1960s. His work gained attention in the West where it was distributed by the Sovfoto agency.

=== Grief ===
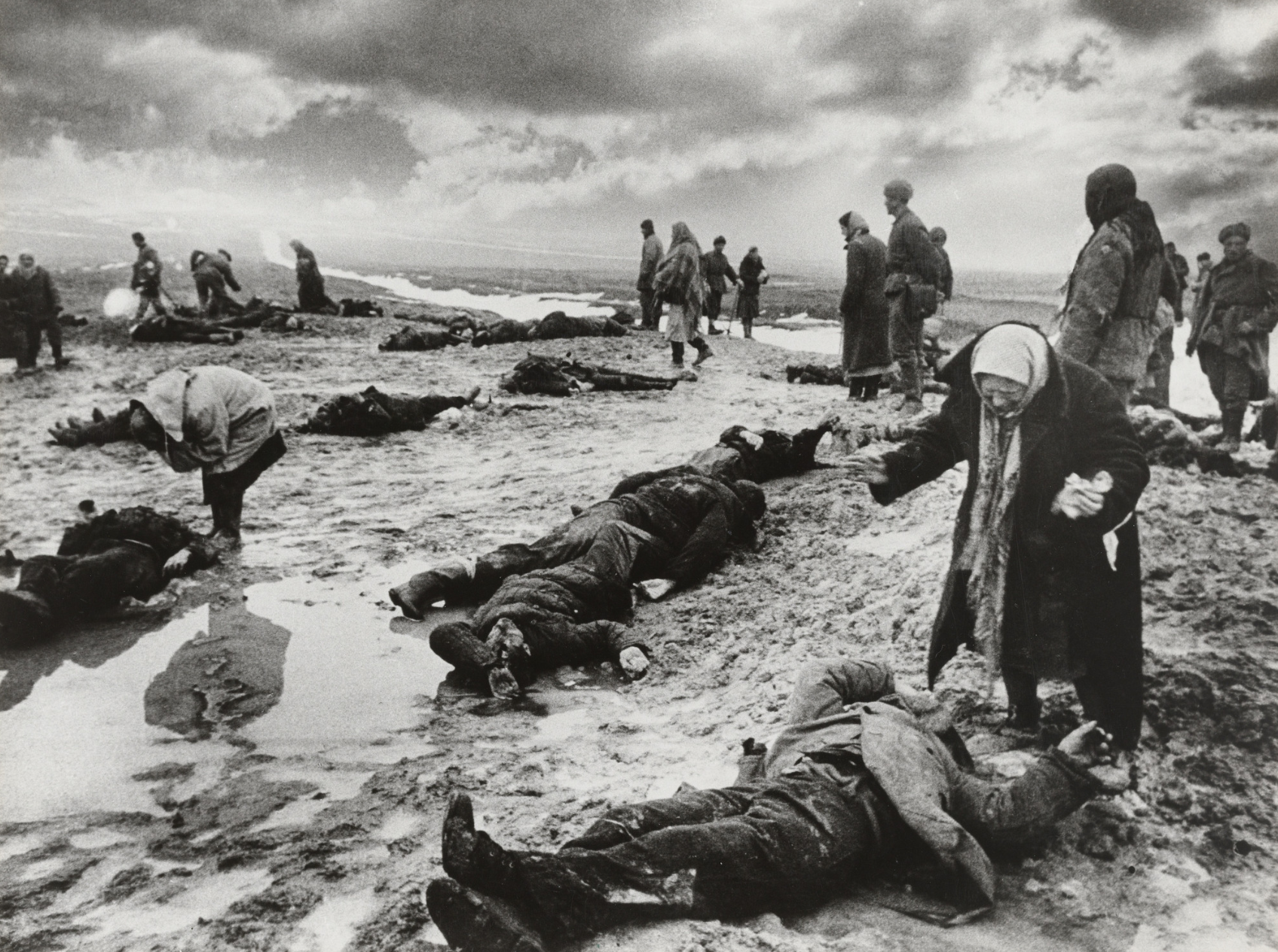
Grief

One of the more famous Baltermants images, titled "Grief", depicts a 1942 Nazi massacre of Jews in the Crimean city of Kerch. It shows the despair of village women as they search for the bodies of their loved ones. A powerful oversaturated sky above, burnt in during the printing of the photo, makes the image even more dramatic.

== Death ==
Baltermants died on June 11, 1990.

== Exhibitions ==
- 2004, Dmitri Baltermants. Images of The Soviet Union, Hatton Gallery, Colorado State University, Fort Collins, USA
- 2005, Dmitry Baltermants, Multimedia Art Museum, Moscow
- 2012, Retrospective, Multimedia Art Museum, Moscow

== Representative works ==
At the Utah Museum of Fine Arts:

- Soviet athletes at the International Peace Festival 2003 photograph Currently not on exhibition UMFA2014.20.28
- Inside the canning factory no date printed 2003, 1912-1990 gelatin silver print Currently not on exhibition UMFA2010.20.15
- Two women gossiping, Cuba 21st Century photograph Currently not on exhibition UMFA2013.11.7
- Pacific fisherman with his nets 1960s, 2003 gelatin silver print Currently not on exhibition UMFA2012.12.24
- Building the Komsomolskaya Blast Furnace, Zhdanov City no date printed 2003, 1912-1990 gelatin silver print Currently not on exhibition UMFA2010.20.19
- Bomber commander V. Kovalik and his men 2003 photograph Currently not on exhibition UMFA2014.20.18
- Agricultural workers no date printed 2003, 1912-1990 gelatin silver print Currently not on exhibition UMFA2010.20.18
- Khrushchev inaugurates a statute, early 1960s 1962 printed 2003, 1912-1990 gelatin silver print Currently not on exhibition UMFA2010.20.35
- Khrushchev seated with the Communist Party Central Committee, including Mikoyan, Brezhnev, Suslov, Gromyko and Furtseva (diptych, part two) 2003 photograph Currently not on exhibition UMFA2014.20.30B
