= USSR in Construction =

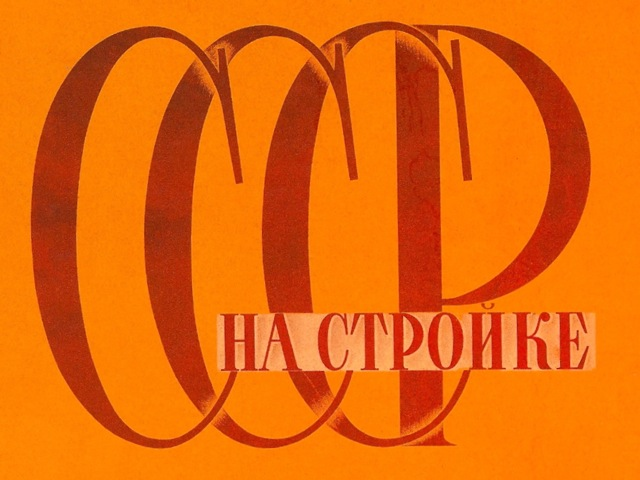
- Frequency: Monthly
- First issue: 1931
- Final issue: 1941 and 1949
- Country: Soviet Union
- Based in: Moscow

USSR in Construction (Russian: СССР на стройке) was a journal published in the decade of 1930 to 1941, as well as briefly in 1949, in the Soviet Union. It became a counter-current in the first year of socialist realism. With elements such as oversized pages and multi-page fold-outs, each issue exists as an elaborate artistic creation. The first issue of the journal was edited by Maxim Gorky.

The journal was published in Russian, French, English, German, and, from 1938, Spanish. The journal presented the industrialization of the Soviet Union. The self-proclaimed purpose of the magazine was to "reflect in photography the whole scope and variety of the construction work now going on the USSR”. Contributing artists focused on a single theme or project for each issue. The scope of the journal quickly expanded, however, with later issues focusing on different ethnic republics and regions, various building projects, new transportation routes, and themes of daily life such as children, the arts, and athletics, in addition to special political issues.

The journal was published over the course of eleven years and brought together articles by writers such as Alexander Fadeyev, Isaac Babel, and Sergei Tretyakov, with montages composed from images created by the Soviet Union's photo-journalists: Max Alpert, Arkady Shaikhet, Georgii Zelma, Boris Ignatovich, Semion Fridland, and George Petrusov. El Lissitzky and Sophie Lissitzky-Küppers designed the overall layout and cover arrangements for a number of issues, as did Alexander Rodchenko and his wife, Varvara Stepanova.

USSR in Construction first appeared not long after Stalin's denunciations of Constructivism as a bourgeois art form and the official proclamation of socialist realism as the only acceptable style of art. Many avant-garde artists thus turned to photomontage as an alternative mode of expression which could side-step around the censorship of painting. The last issue of the journal was published in December 1949. The magazine was succeeded by another one, Soviet Union, which was launched in March 1950. Japanese illustrated propaganda magazine Front was modeled on USSR in Construction.

== Editorial board ==
Apart from Gorky, the official chief editors in the 1930s were Georgy Pyatakov, Valery Mezhlak, Alexander Kosarev. The de facto editor-in-chief of the magazine in the late 1930s was Yevgenia Feigenberg, the wife of Nikolai Yezhov.

The first composition of the editorial board included Mikhail Koltsov, Fedor Konar, Artemy Khalatov and Semyon Uritsky. Separate issues were published under the editorship of Alexander Rodchenko, El Lissitzky and other editorial staff. The main artist was Nikolai Stepanovich Troshin.

== See also ==
- History of the Soviet Union (1927–1953)
- Propaganda in the Soviet Union
- Photomontage
