= Georgy Petrusov =

Soviet photographer

Georgy Grigoryevich Petrusov (Russian: Георгий Григорьевич Петрусов; 1903 – 1971) was a Soviet photographer. His photographs were exhibited at the Multimedia Art Museum, Moscow in 2010–2011.
