= Suslov =

Suslov (Russian: Суслов) is a Russian masculine surname, its feminine counterpart is Suslova (Russian: Суслова). Notable people with the surname include:

- Elena Suslova (born 1984), Russian football defender
- Iryna Suslova (born 1988), Ukrainian politician
- Kirill Suslov (born 1991), Russian football defender
- Mikhail Suslov (1902–1982), Soviet statesman
- Nadezhda Suslova (1843–1918), Russian physician
- Nikolay Suslov (born 1969), Russian film producer and writer
- Oleh Suslov (born 1969), Ukrainian football player
- Polina Suslova (1839–1918), Russian short story writer, sister of Nadezhda
- Tomáš Suslov (born 2002), Slovak football player
- Vladimir Suslov
  - Vladimir Antonovich Suslov (born 1939), Russian politician
  - Vladimir Vasilyevich Suslov (1857–1921), Russian architect
