= Front (Japanese magazine) =

Japanese photo magazine (1942–1945)

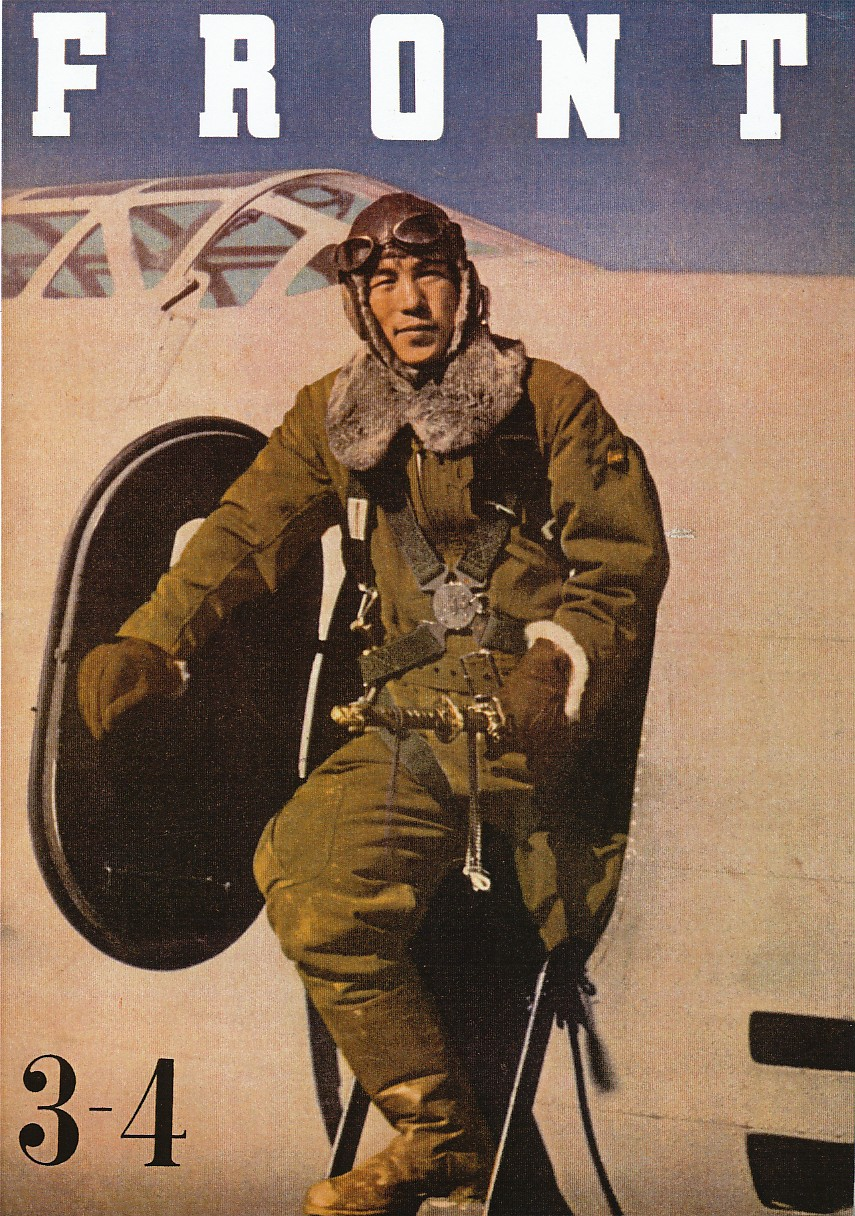
- Editor: Ihei Kimura
- Categories: Photo magazine
- Publisher: Tōhōsha
- Founded: 1942
- Final issue: 1945
- Country: Japan
- Language: Multilingual

Front, stylized as FRONT, was a propaganda photo magazine which featured photographs of Japanese war heroes between 1942 and 1945 during World War II.

== History and profile ==
Front was established in 1942. It was modeled on the Soviet propaganda magazine entitled SSSR na Stroike (Russian: USSR in Construction). The publisher of Front was Tōhōsha (Japanese: Far East Company) which was founded by Okada Sozo in 1941 to launch the magazine. The Japanese International Press Photography Association also involved in the publication of the magazine under the direction of the army general staff. The magazine had 15-language editions which were distributed by the Greater East Asia Co-Prosperity Sphere. Its format was large, and the magazine featured photos and photomontages for propaganda purposes. Major contributors of Front were Ihei Kimura who also edited the magazine and Hiroshi Hamaya. The magazine ceased publication in 1945.
