= Mikhail Koltsov =

Soviet journalist

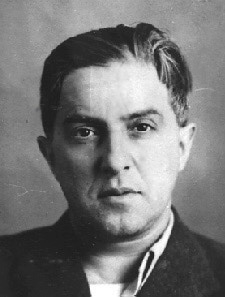
- Official photo NKVD after arrest 1938
- Born: Moisey Fridlyand; 12 June [O.S. 31 May] 1898
- Died: February 2, 1940 (aged 41)
- Resting place: Donskoye Cemetery
- Occupations: Writer, publicist, journalist
- Relatives: Boris Efimov (brother)
- Awards: Order of the Red Banner; Order of the Red Star

Signature
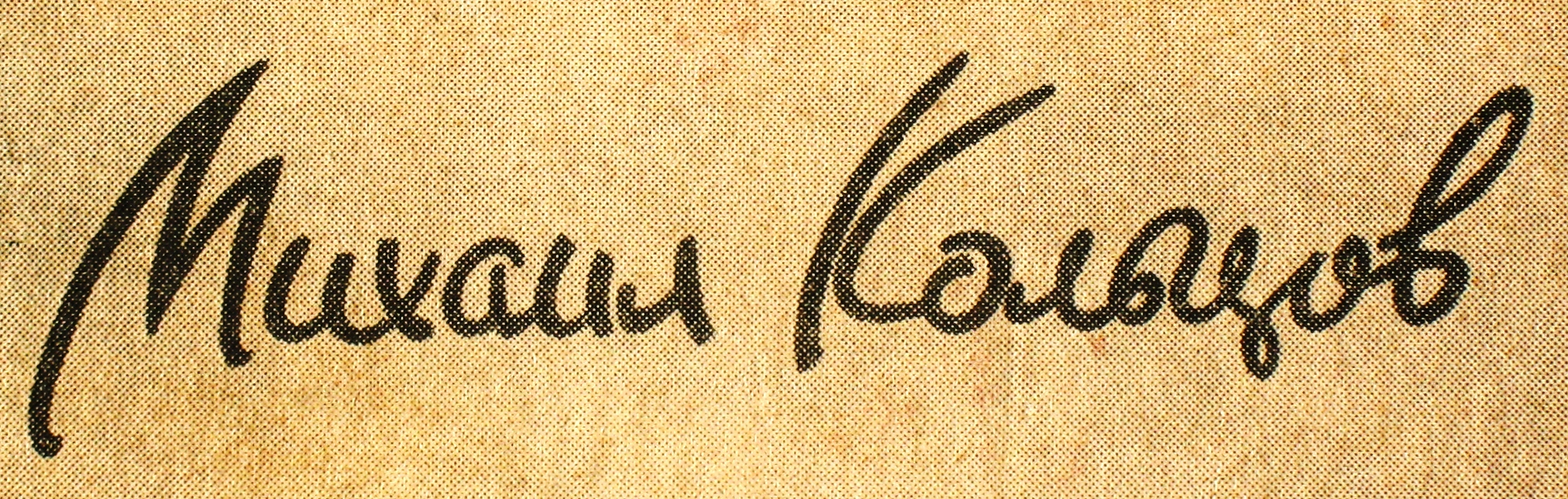

Mikhail Efimovich Koltsov (Russian: Михаи́л Ефи́мович Кольцо́в) (12 June [O.S. 31 May] 1898 – February 2, 1940), born Moisey Haimovich Fridlyand (Russian: Моисей Хаимович Фридлянд), was a Soviet journalist, revolutionary and NKVD agent. He served as the editor-in-chief of the satirical magazine, Krokodil.

== Biography ==
Born in Kiev, Koltsov was the son of a Jewish shoemaker Haim Movshevich Fridlyand and the brother of Boris Efimov. Koltsov participated in the Russian Revolution of 1917, became a member of the Bolshevik Party in 1918 and took part in the Russian Civil War. A convinced communist, he soon became a key figure of the Soviet intellectual elite and arguably the most famous journalist in the Soviet Union, chiefly because of his well-written satirical essays and articles in which he criticised bureaucracy and other negative phenomena in the Soviet Union. Koltsov edited and founded popular journals such as Krokodil, Chudak, Sovetskoe Foto and Ogoniok and was a member of the editorial board of Pravda. As a Pravda correspondent, he travelled to Spain to cover the Spanish Civil War while he worked for the NKVD. He also acted as military advisor to Loyalist forces on occasion. Koltsov is widely regarded as having been Joseph Stalin's chief reporter in the war, with speculation suggesting that he had a direct line from his hotel to the Kremlin.

The British communist journalist Claud Cockburn, who met Koltsov in Spain, described him as "a stocky little Jew with a huge head and one of the most expressive faces of any man I ever met.... He unquestionably and positively enjoyed the sense of danger and sometime – by his political indiscretions, for instance, or still more wildly indiscreet love affairs – deliberately created dangers which need not have existed". George Orwell, in Homage to Catalonia (1938), accused Cockburn of co-operating with Koltsov to produce false stories, which favoured Soviet objectives in Spain. Ernest Hemingway, in his novel For Whom the Bell Tolls, based on the war, represented Koltsov as the character Karkov. Koltsov described his experiences in The Spanish Diary, which was published in 1938.

Koltsov returned to the Soviet Union in November 1937 and became a close friend of Yevgenia Yezhova, the wife of the head of the NKVD, Nikolai Yezhov.

On 19 December 1937, Koltsov published an article criticising some aspects of the purges. The article asserted that, to protect themselves, some people had smeared the innocent. It called on the party, the government, the courts and public opinion to stop such "heartless liars who violated the rights of Soviet citizens".

He was arrested on 14 December 1938, four weeks after Yezhova had committed suicide and nine days after Yezhov had been removed from the chairmanship of the NKVD and replaced by Lavrentiy Beria. After Yezhov's arrest in 1939, he told his interrogators in May that Koltsov and Yezhova had been lovers and that "Yezhova was connected with Koltsov with respect to espionage work on behalf of England". He was included on a list of 346 "enemies of the people" marked for execution, submitted by Beria to the Politburo, on 16 January 1940. The list included Yezhov, at least 60 other former NKVD officers and at least two more of Yezhova's former lovers, one of whom was the writer Isaac Babel. Koltsov was shot on 2 February 1940. His third wife, Maria Osten, was also sentenced and shot.

He was rehabilitated in 1954.

== See also ==
- For Whom the Bell Tolls (Koltsov was the Karkov character in the story)
- Hemingway & Gellhorn
