= Sovetskoe Foto =

Cover of Sovetskoe Foto No.10, October 1927 featuring Aleksandr Rodchenko's portrait Mat’ ('Mother'), of 1924.

Sovetskoe Foto (Russian: Советское фото, English: 'Soviet Photography') was the sole specialist photography magazine in the Soviet Union. Founded by the writer and editor Mikhail Kotsov in April 1926, it was published in Moscow, Russia, from 1926 to 1991.

== The publication ==
Sovetskoe Foto's editorials, letters, articles, advertisements for photographic chemicals and equipment, technical instruction and photoessays catered to a broad audience from professional photojournalists to amateur photographers, 'worker–photographers' and the camera clubs established post-WWII at almost every industrial plant and Palace of Culture throughout Soviet Union, and promoted the 'worker photographer' and the official photographic culture of the USSR, though it also carried examples of state-sanctioned international photography.

It was published monthly with exceptions being double issues in some years and during 1929 and 1930, when it was published twice a month. In 1931 it was acquired by the Ogonek publishing company and briefly renamed Proletarskoe foto (Proletariat photography). It appeared only once in two months in 1934. It suspended publication between 1942 and 1956 because of the Second World War and the resultant postwar economic situation.

== Ethos ==
Koltsov launched Sovetskoe Foto as a forum for photojournalists across the country, Soviet in ethos, and distinct from Pictorialist art photography. In its first editorial it proclaimed:

In the USSR photography is still in the hands of a few. The uncoordinated 'art photography' of handicraft professionals, the narrow circles of refined photo artists, the 'gastronomes' of photography, the active and lively but quite modest in quantity group of photo-reporters, and the quite large but disorganised and unaided cadres of amateurs- here for the time being is our 'photographic society.".

The magazine recognised and promoted the value of photography to the communist cause; a photograph of a steel-worker was captioned: "In the USSR photography is one of the weapons of the class struggle and of socialist construction.” Its pages became the site of ideological battle. The cover of Sovetskoe Foto, no. 10, October 1927 (above) featured the well-known Aleksandr Rodchenko portrait Mat’ ('Mother'), of 1924, but by as early as April 1928, thus even before Socialist Realism was decreed in 1934 to be the official style of the Soviet Union, the works of avant-garde photographers, including Rodchenko’s, were denounced in a reader’s letter as ‘formalist’, foreign and elitist, ‘plagiarised’ from Western European photographers László Moholy-Nagy and Albert Renger-Patzsch. Rodchenko’s work was banished from the magazine and he had to use Novy Lef, a journal for alternative art and culture, to respond.

This conflict of avant-garde "Octoberist" photographers and photographers of and for the proletariat culminated in 1931 with the formation of the Russian Association of Proletarian Photo Reporters (ROPF), which promoted its mission to use photography as “a weapon for the socialist reconstruction of reality” in Sovetskoe foto. Throughout the 1930s the journal became increasingly conservative in valuing content over form, and by the mid-1930s Sovetskoe Foto's cover shots of workers and working photographers were being replaced by those of the leaders and apparatchiks, with Stalin gracing almost every cover.

== Influences ==
Though the Soviet regime isolated its population from outside influences, and though photography served a more directly propagandistic purpose than elsewhere, there are clear overlaps in the type of imagery in the magazine with counterparts in the West; its inter-war humanist tendency and subject matter has parallels in Western Europe in Vu and the United States in Life. By the 1970s and 1980s, contributors shared a fascination with abstraction, posterisation and optical effects with photographers whose work was found in the Swiss Camera of the same period.
