= Natalia Grigorieva-Litvinskaya =

- Григорьева Наталья Эдуардовна
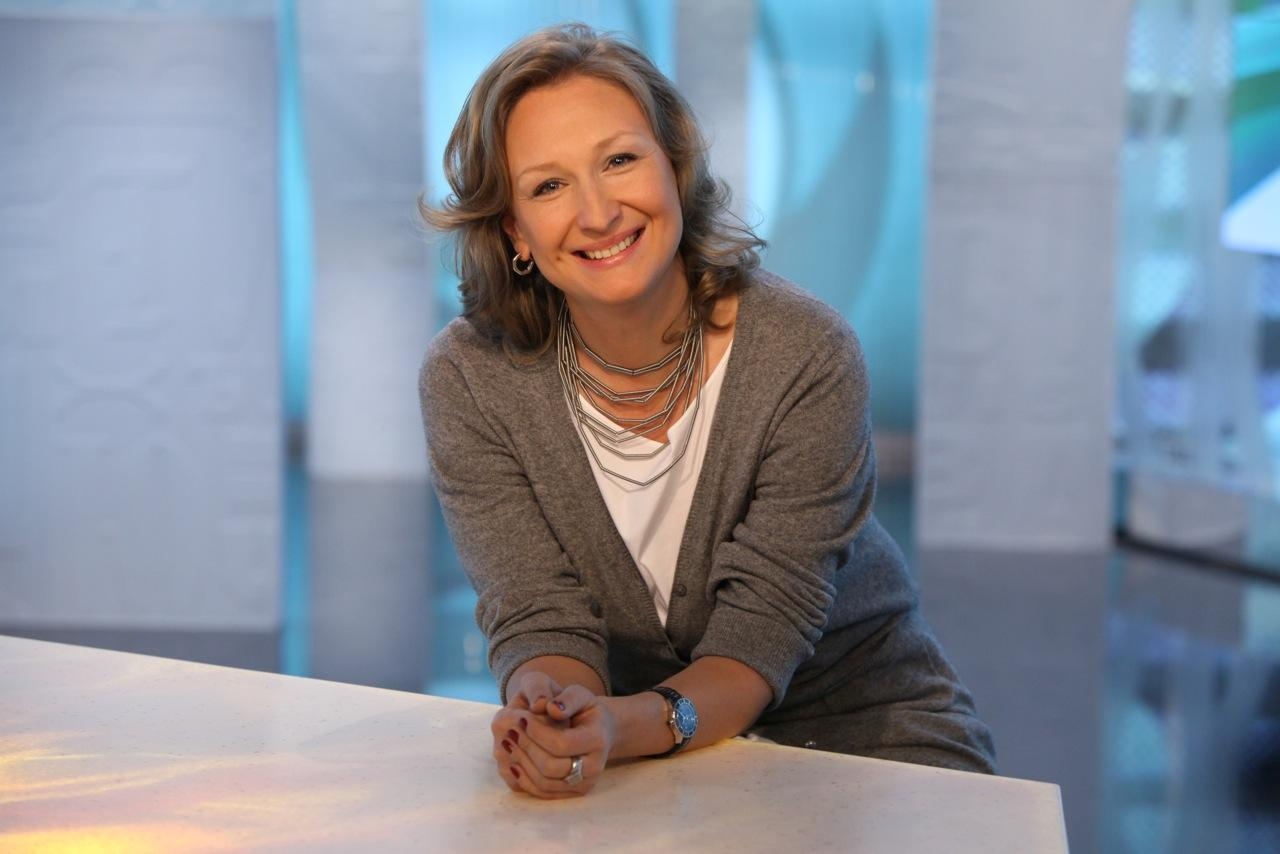
- Photograph of Natalia in the year 2013.
- Born: Natalia Eduardovna Grigorieva-Litvinskaya; October 1, 1970 (age 55)
- Education: Moscow Aviation Institute, international university of Moscow
- Known for: Founding art galleries

Natalia Eduardovna Grigorieva-Litvinskaya (Russian: Наталья Эдуардовна Григорьева-Литвинская; born October 1, 1970) is a founder and Chief Curator of The Lumiere Gallery (2001) – the first Russian photography gallery, aimed at encouraging promotion and sales of the finest Russian and European photographs in Moscow.

In 2010, Natalia founded the Lumiere Brothers Center for Photography. The Museum's exhibition program aims to provide a broad perspective on photography with a special emphasis on Russian 20th century artists. The program has been built around the center's collection and collaborations with contemporary photographers and private collectors.

In April 2021, Natalia opened the Lumiere Gallery's new venue in Moscow on Bolshaya Polyanka.

== Early life ==
In 1995, Natalia Grigorieva graduated from Moscow Aviation Institute; in 1998 - from International University in Moscow; In 2001, Natalia, together with her husband, Eduard Litvinsky, opened Lumiere Brothers Gallery at the Center House of Artists – first photography gallery in Russia.

== Career ==
In 2010, Natalia and Eduard founded the Lumiere Brothers Center for Photography, a private exhibition organization for 20th century Russian photography and highlighting acclaimed and emerging foreign artists. The Center possesses one of the largest collections of the 20th century Russian photography in the world.

She has developed relations with the Russian photography market. Natalia has closely worked with America, Europe and Asian artists, including recent participation as a portfolio reviewer at Lianzhou FotoFest 2015 and FotoFest Houston 2016.

=== Exhibitions ===
For the last 5 years Natalia has curated over 70 exhibitions, including:

- The Soviet photography 60-70: Yuri Abramochkin, Lev Borodulin, Igor Gnevashev, Naum Granovsky, Yakov Khalip, Vladimir Lagrange
- The Phenomenon of the Lithuanian photography school: Antanas Sutkus, Vitalijus Butyrinas, Aleksandras Macijauskas
- Josef Koudelka. Invasion 68: Prague
- Ruth Orkin. Retrospective
- Steve Schapiro. Living America
- Vivian Maier. Riddle
- Arno Rafael Minkkinen. Retrospective
- Arnold Newman. Portraits and Abstractions
- Sabine Weiss. Hommage à Sabine
- Elliott Erwitt. Elliott Erwitt's Kolor at Red October
- Robert Whitman. Mikhail Baryshnikov
- Giovanni Gastel. Canons of Beauty
- Ezra Stoller. Pioneers of American Modernism
- Sheila Metzner. The Magic Of Metzner
- Harry Benson. The Beatles and more
- Miles Aldridge. Taste of colour
- Alexander Rodchenko. From the Still Art Foundation Collection
- Guy Bourdin. Follow me

Having organized a number of monographic exhibitions of foreign artists, the Center aims to expand its international program by creating conceptual exhibitions that would become a meeting ground for works produced by different artists and covering various countries and periods.

Starting from 2017, Natalia is curating Moscow's first international contemporary photography and photobook festival. The focus of the festival is the issues of actual documentary and art photography, the transformation of the photographic image in post-digital time, alternative models of art and media markets.

== Bibliography ==
- Photo 60–70. Moscow: The Lumiere Brothers Center for Photography. 2008. ISBN 978-5-9901613-1-3.
- Moscow of Naum Granovsky. Moscow: The Lumiere Brothers Center for Photography. 2009. ISBN 978-5-9901613-2-0.
- Icons of the 1960s-1980s. Moscow: The Lumiere Brothers Center for Photography. 2010. ISBN 978-5-9901613-3-7.
- Icons of the 1990s. Moscow: The Lumiere Brothers Center for Photography. 2011. ISBN 978-5-905196-02-7.
- Soviet era by Markov-Grinberg. Moscow: The Lumiere Brothers Center for Photography / Damiani. 2012. ISBN 978-88-6208-227-3.
- Time of the Little Bells. Moscow: The Lumiere Brothers Center for Photography. 2013. ISBN 9785905196034.
- The Moscow Stories. Twentieth century. Moscow: The Lumiere Brothers Center for Photography. 2013. ISBN 978-5-98797-076-8.
- PROzavod. Industrial photography. The twentieth century. Moscow: The Lumiere Brothers Center for Photography. 2014. ISBN 978-5-905196-04-1.
- The Conquest. Yakov Khalip, Heir to the Russian Avant-Garde. Moscow: The Lumiere Brothers Center for Photography. 2016. ISBN 978-5-98797-129-1.
