= The Lumiere Brothers Gallery =

Russian art gallery

Coordinates: 55.7310°N 37.6222°E

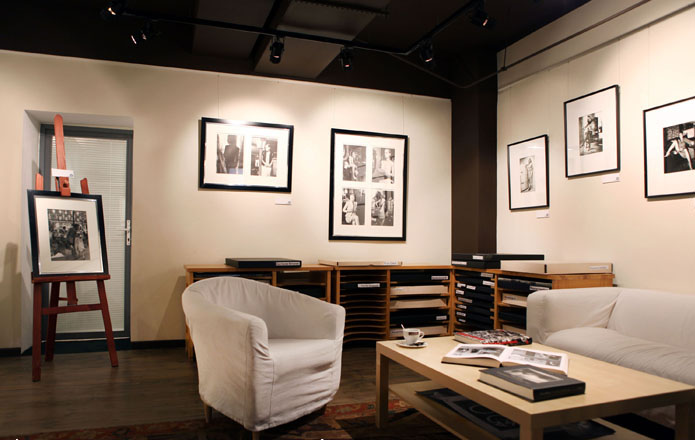
Lumiere Brothers Gallery

The Lumiere Brothers Gallery is a Russian art gallery founded in Moscow in 2001 by Natalia Grigorieva-Litvinskaya. The gallery specializes in 1930s soviet-era photography. The gallery has promoted works from the Khrushchev Thaw era of Soviet history; it also presents works from Lithuanian artists.

== Works ==
The gallery contains photography from the 1930s up until the 1980s.

Work from Soviet constructivist photographers Boris Ignatovich, Jakov Khalip, and Mikhail Prekhner is included in the gallery. Their techniques – unconventional angles, tilted horizons, stark contrasts of light and shadow – reveal the influence of their teacher and associate Alexander Rodchenko and recall the formal experiments of Moholy-Nagy Laszlo and the New Objectivity group led by Albert Renger-Patzsch.

The photography of Stalin’s era is represented by the socialist realism-style works of celebrated Soviet reporters such as Mark Markov-Grinberg, Emmanuil Evzerikhin and Arkady Shaikhet; architectural photography with iconic views of cityscapes, pioneered by the chronicler of Moscow life Naum Granovsky; and reports from battlefronts by war correspondents such as Alexander Ustinov and Robert Diament.

The gallery has been at the forefront of reintroducing and promoting the work of major photographers of the 1960s and 1970s, including Yuri Krivonosov, Yuriy Abramochkin, Lev Borodulin, Vladimir Lagrange, Igor Gavrilov, Lev Sherstennikov, Vladimir Bogdanov, Nina Sviridova, Dmitry Vozdvizhensky, Igor Gnevashev and others who, inspired by postwar optimism and liberal reforms, revived straight reportage and gave a fresh impetus to artistic photography, to which they were introduced in photographic clubs spread across the USSR.

The gallery has works by Romualdas Požerskis, a Lithuanian photographer whose work stands out from Soviet photography due to its distinctive national aesthetic and techniques, such as the use of wide angle lenses, close-ups, and sharp contrasts.

Postwar European and American art is represented by reporters of the golden age of photojournalism such as Steve Schapiro, Ruth Orkin and Sabine Weiss. They are noted for their unmanipulated self-portraits in landscape.

The gallery's Russian contemporary artists encompass a variety of styles which have appeared in Russian photography during the last three decades, including the 1980s underground artist Sergey Borisov, conceptualist Vadim Guschin, one of the fathers of the St Petersburg school of photography, Alexander Kitaev, and contemporary architectural photographers Vladimir Antoschenkov and Igor Palmin, who was centered on Moscow modernism.

== See also ==
- Lumiere Brothers Center for Photography
