= The Lumiere Brothers Center for Photography =

Private exhibition organization in Moscow

Coordinates: 55.7310°N 37.6222°E

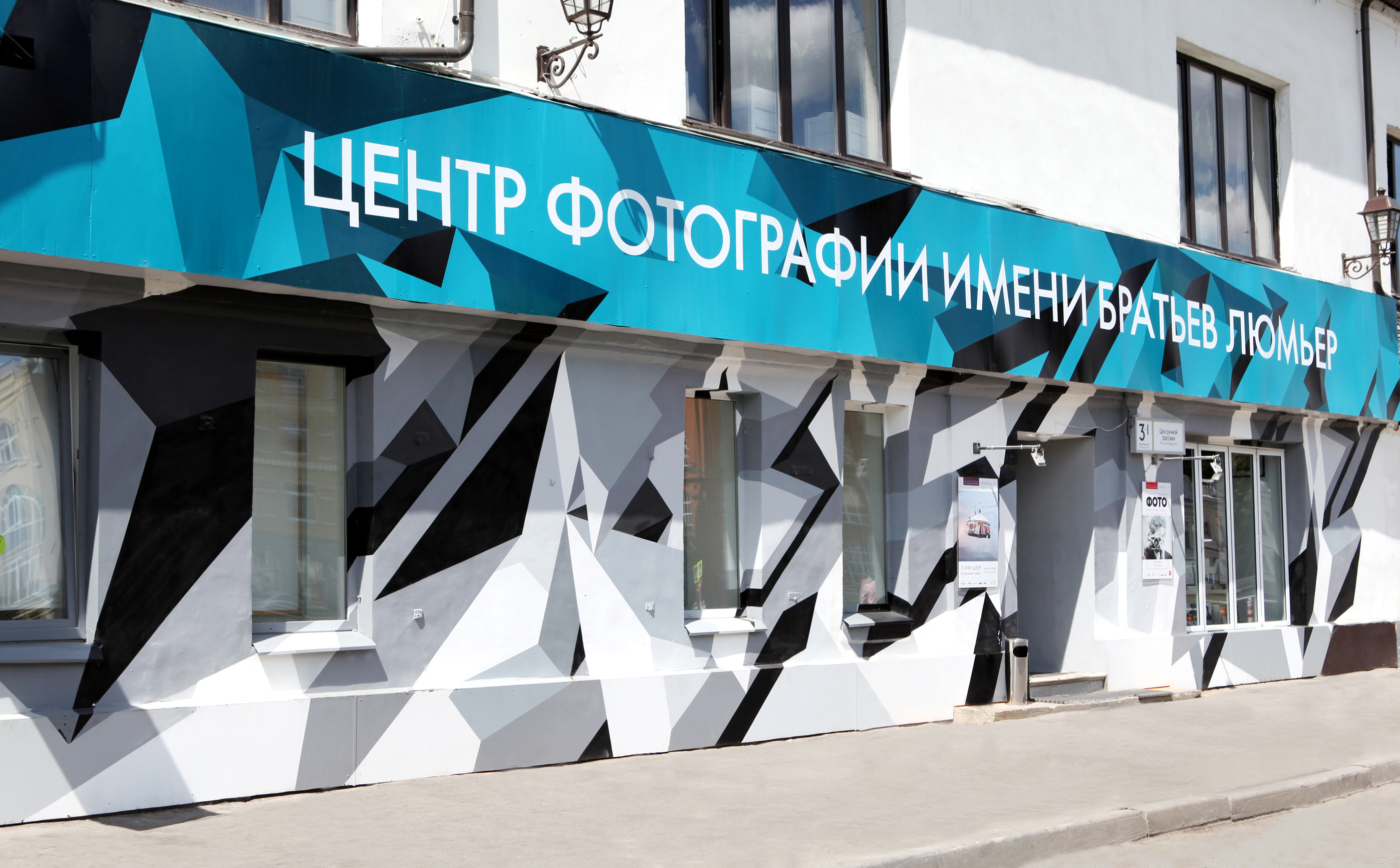
The façade of The Lumiere Brothers Center for Photography

The Lumiere Brothers Center for Photography (Russian: Центр фотографии имени братьев Люмьер tr. Tsentr fotografy imeni brat'yev Lyum'yer) is a private exhibition organization located in the former chocolate factory and acting art cluster Red October in Moscow.

Since its foundation in 2010, the center aims to explore and promote Russian and foreign photography, support emerging Russian artists and explore beyond the medium. A private collection of Natalia and Eduard Litvinsky laid the foundation for the center's collection.

Works from the Center's collection were shown at the Fotofest 2012 Biennal, triennial Bergen Assembly in 2013, Garage Museum of Contemporary Art, museum and exhibition association Moscow Manege, Jewish Museum and Tolerance Center, Tretyakov Gallery in Moscow.

The center's exhibitions were shown at the State Russian Museum and Erarta in St-Petersburg, Krasnoyarsk museum center, Cherepovets museum association, Kazan city hall, Ekaterinburg Museum of Fine Arts, and Heydar Aliyev Center in Baku, Azerbaijan.

Lumiere Gallery (by The Lumiere Brothers Center owners) opened a new venue in Moscow in April 2021.

== Exhibition programme ==
For the past 19 years the gallery has amassed a vast collection of prints featuring chef d’oeuvres by renowned Soviet and the World famous artists: Alexander Rodchenko, Antanas Sutkus, Yakov Khalip, Vladimir Lagrange, Arnold Newman, Wynn Bullock, Ruth Orkin, Elliott Erwitt, Steve Schapiro, Guy Bourdin, Vivian Maier, Sabine Weiss, Harry Benson, Sheila Metzner, Miles Aldridge.

Exhibition programme is based on research activities focused on studying and interpretation of the Russian photography of the 20th century. Group exhibitions tracing the history of Russian photography from the perspective of genres (100 Years of Russian and Soviet History in Faces, PROzavod, The Moscow Stories. Twentieth century (1 and 2)) and cultural aspects (Soviet Photo, The Icons of the 1960s -1980s, The Icons of the 1990s, Time of the Little Bells) aim to put Russian photography in the context of world art history.

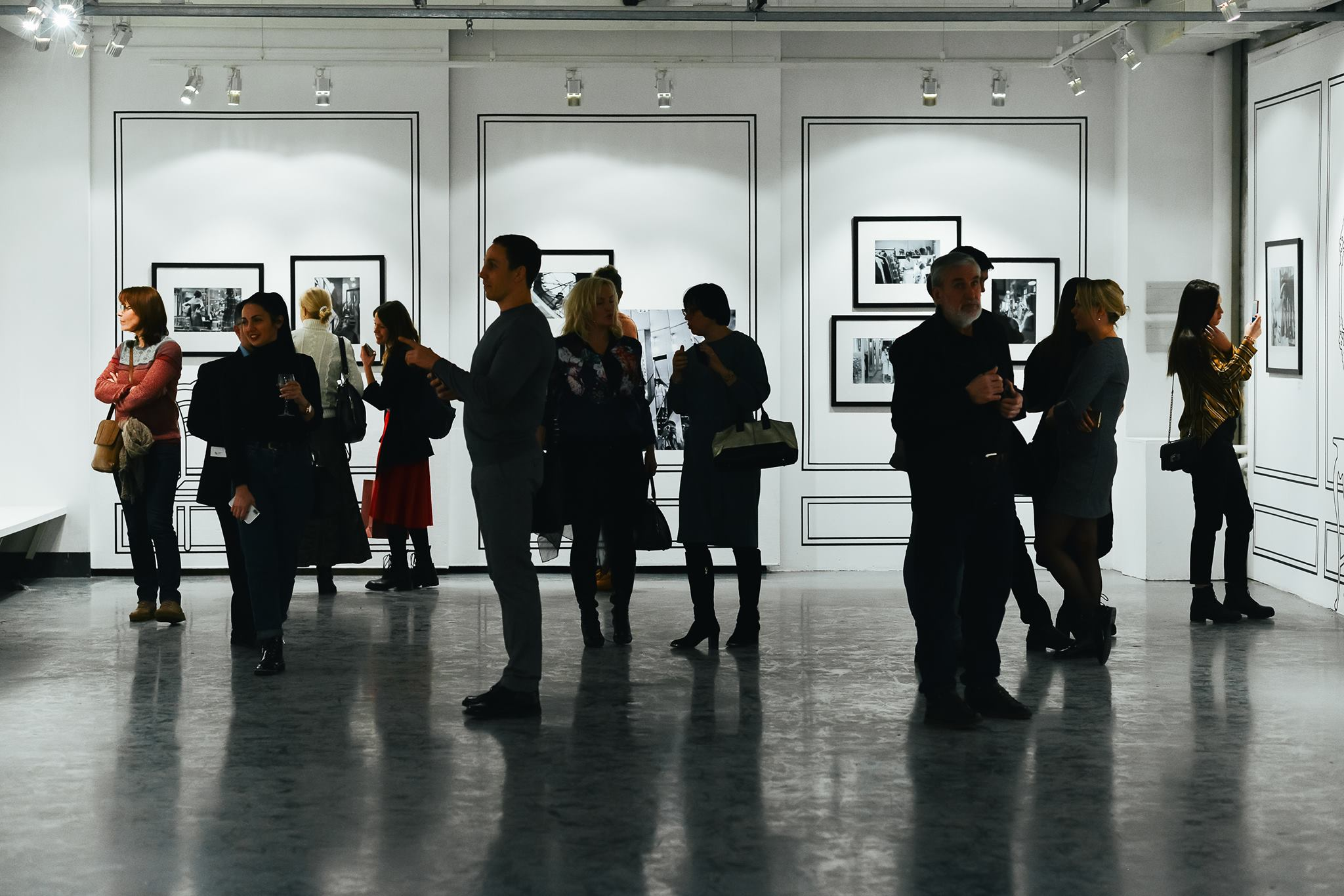
The opening of the exhibition Douglas Kirkland. Behind the scenes

=== Selected exhibitions ===
- The Soviet photography 60-70: Yuri Abramochkin, Lev Borodulin, Igor Gnevashev, Naum Granovsky, Yakov Khalip, Vladimir Lagrange
- The Phenomenon of the Lithuanian photography school: Antanas Sutkus, Vitalijus Butyrinas, Aleksandras Macijauskas
- Josef Koudelka. Invasion 68: Prague
- Ruth Orkin. Retrospective
- Steve Schapiro. Living America
- Vivian Maier. Riddle
- Arno Rafael Minkkinen. Retrospective
- Arnold Newman. Portraits and Abstractions
- Sabine Weiss. Hommage à Sabine
- Elliott Erwitt. Elliott Erwitt's Kolor at Red October
- Robert Whitman. Mikhail Baryshnikov
- Giovanni Gastel. Canons of Beauty
- Ezra Stoller. Pioneers of American Modernism
- Sheila Metzner. The Magic Of Metzner
- Harry Benson. The Beatles and more
- Miles Aldridge. Taste of colour
- Alexander Rodchenko. From the Still Art Foundation Collection
- Guy Bourdin. Follow me

== Collection ==
The collection was established in 2004, and now contains more than 13000 prints by Russian and foreign artists.

The collection includes works by Russian photographers of the late 19-early 20th century, including: Karl Bulla, Alexander Greenberg, and Yuri Eremin.

Among the collection's major works are photographs by Soviet Avant-garde artists: Alexander Rodchenko, Boris Ignatovich, Eleazar Langman, Mikhail Prekhner, Arkady Shaikhet, Georgi Petrusov, Yakov Khalip.

== Publishing programme ==
Publications result from research activities and accompany the major projects of the center.

- Photo 60–70. Moscow: The Lumiere Brothers Center for Photography. 2008. ISBN 978-5-9901613-1-3.
- Moscow of Naum Granovsky. Moscow: The Lumiere Brothers Center for Photography. 2009. ISBN 978-5-9901613-2-0.
- Icons of the 1960s-1980s. Moscow: The Lumiere Brothers Center for Photography. 2010. ISBN 978-5-9901613-3-7.
- Icons of the 1990s. Moscow: The Lumiere Brothers Center for Photography. 2011. ISBN 978-5-905196-02-7.
- Soviet era by Markov-Grinberg. Moscow: The Lumiere Brothers Center for Photography / Damiani. 2012. ISBN 978-88-6208-227-3.
- Time of the Little Bells. Moscow: The Lumiere Brothers Center for Photography. 2013. ISBN 9785905196034.
- The Moscow Stories. Twentieth century. Moscow: The Lumiere Brothers Center for Photography. 2013. ISBN 978-5-98797-076-8.
- PROzavod. Industrial photography. The twentieth century. Moscow: The Lumiere Brothers Center for Photography. 2014. ISBN 978-5-905196-04-1.
- The Conquest. Yakov Khalip, Heir to the Russian Avant-Garde. Moscow: The Lumiere Brothers Center for Photography. 2016. ISBN 978-5-98797-129-1.

== Educational programme ==
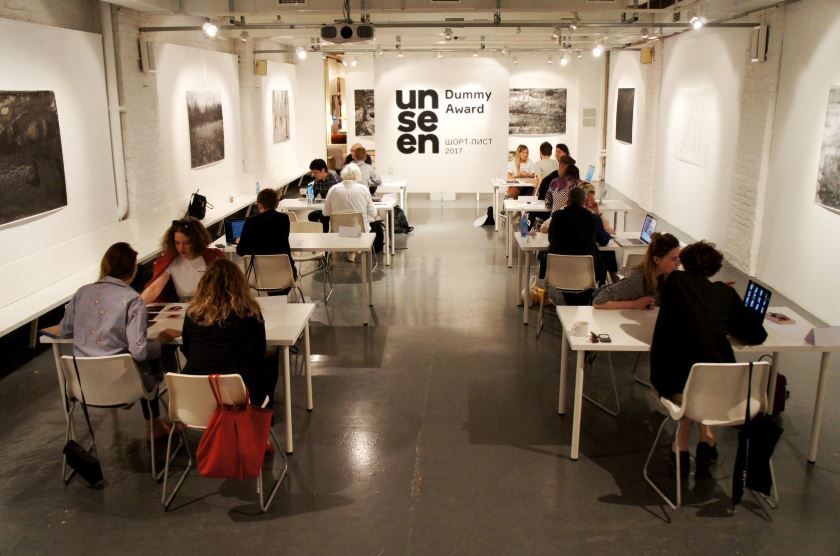
PHOTOBOOKFEST session of portfolio review for photographers.

Its educational program aims to contribute to a greater public understanding and appreciation of photography and creating opportunities for communication and collaboration between photographers, curators, amateurs and those interested in photography. The program includes guided tours, workshops, screenings, artist talks, forums. Arno Rafael Minkkinen, Steve Schapiro, Sheila Metzner, Harry Benson, Miles Aldridge, Laurent Chehere, and other prominent artists held their workshops in the center.

== Photobookfest ==
Photobookfest is a large-scaled international event, dedicated to the photobook industry and photographic art in Russia. The festival`s programme consist of exhibition and education blocks, as well as a Photobook dummy contest. Photobookfest hosted sessions of portfolio-review for photographers with the participation of leading international experts.

== Library and café ==
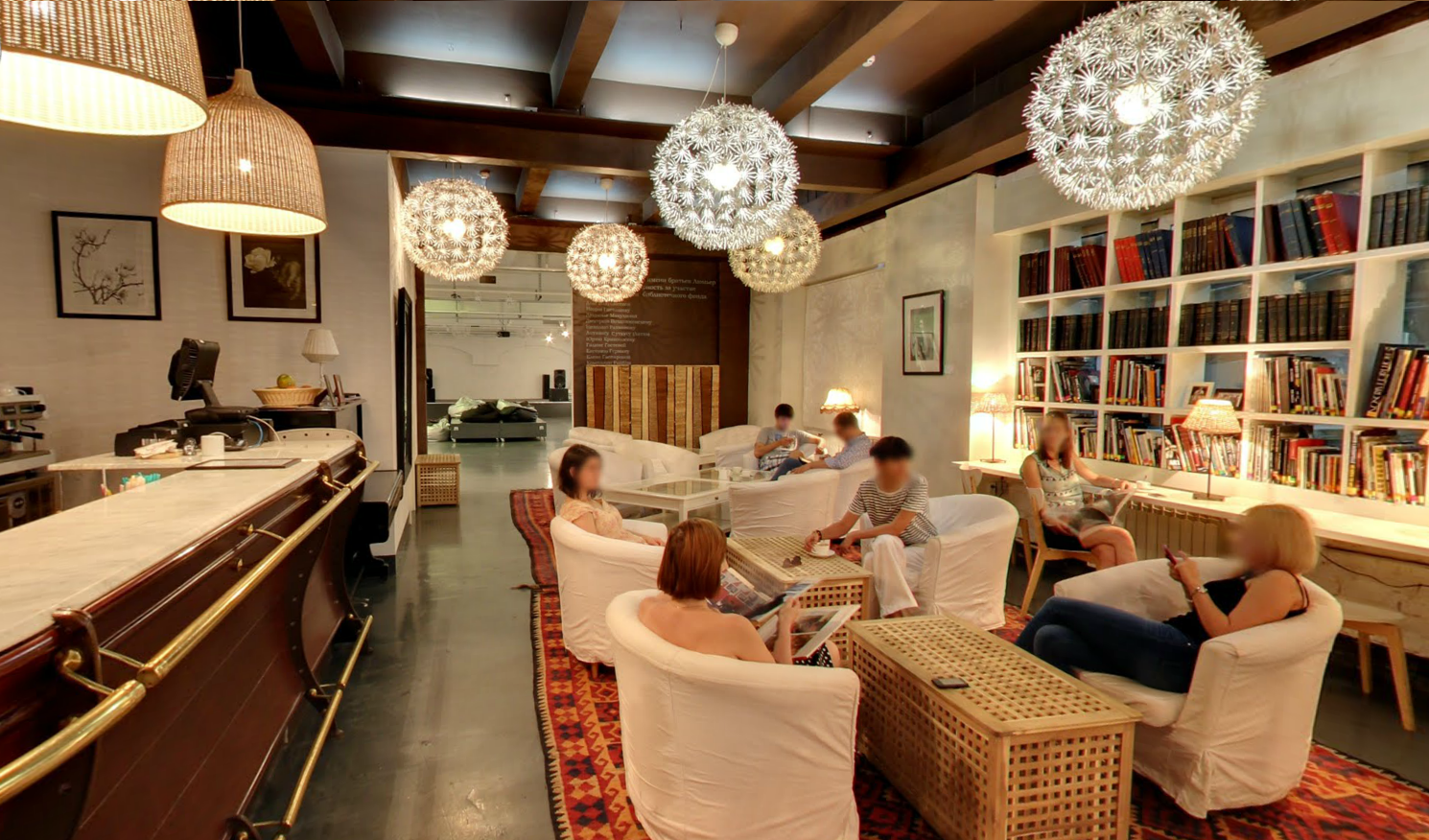
Library at the Lumiere Brothers Center for Photography

The center includes a café and library dedicated to photography. The library houses a large collection of books by Russian and foreign publishing houses. It encompasses books on the history and theory of photography, photography techniques, back issues of magazines Soviet photo, and Ogonyek.

== Bookshop PhotoBookPoster ==
Bookshop PhotoBookPoster has a wide range of photography books from Russian and international publishers.
