= Gushchin =

Gushchin, Guschin or Hushchyn (Russian: Гущин) is a Russian surname that may refer to

- Aleksandr Gushchin (footballer) (born 1966), Russian football player and coach
- Aleksei Guschin (born 1971), Russian football defender
- Aleksey Gushchin (1922–1986), Soviet sports shooter
- Daniil Gushchin (born 2002), Russian ice hockey player
- Eduard Gushchin (1940–2011), Soviet shot putter
- Oleksandr Hushchyn (born 1966), Ukrainian football player
- Vadim Gushchin (born 1963), Russian photographer
