= Aleksandr Gushchin =

Aleksandr Gushchin may refer to:

- Aleksandr Gushchin (footballer) (born 1966), Russian football coach and former player
- Oleksandr Hushchyn (born 1966), retired Ukrainian football player
