= Boris Ignatovich =

Soviet photographer and cinematographer

- Born: 3 April [O.S. 22 March] 1899; Slutsk, Minsk Governorate, Russian Empire
- Died: 4 April 1976; Moscow, USSR
- Resting place: Rogozhskoye Cemetery, Moscow
- Occupations: Photographer, photojournalist, cinematographer, artist
- Spouse: Klavdiya Ignatovich
- Website: borisignatovich.com

Boris Vsevolodovich Ignatovich (Russian: Борис Всеволодович Игнатович; 3 April [O.S. 22 March] 1899 Slutsk, Minsk Governorate, Russian Empire - 4 April 1976, Moscow, USSR) was a Soviet photographer, photojournalist, and cinematographer. He was a pioneer of Soviet avant-garde photography in the 1920s and 1930s, one of the first photojournalists in the USSR, and one of the most significant artists of the Soviet era.

== Early life ==
Boris Ignatovich was born in 1899 in the Russian Empire in the city of Slutsk, in present-day Belarus. He studied at gymnasia in Lodz and Lugansk, until he was expelled in 1917 for the publication of a handwritten magazine and for participation in revolutionary activities. In 1918, he graduated from the Vyborg gymnasium in Petrograd (present-day St. Petersburg).

After graduation, Ignatovich returned to Lugansk, where he began work as a journalist and joined the Communist Party. He worked as an editorial assistant at the Kharkiv newspaper Krasnaya Zvezda and the Kiev newspaper Vseizdat, then as a managing editor of the newspaper Krasnaya Bashkiria in Ufa, Bashkortostan. He was also in charge of the regional office of Russian Telegraph Agency (ROSTA) in Sterlitamak. In 1918, he became one of the first members of the Russian Union of Soviet Journalists in 1918.

In 1922, Ignatovich rose to become chief editor of the Moscow newspaper Gornyak. Accusations that he had published unverified reports from amateur proletarian journalists known as rabkor led to his demotion from membership in the Communist Party and dismissal from his job as editor. He relocated to Petrograd, where he headed the editorial boards of the magazines Drezina, Smekhach, and Buzotyor.

== Early career ==
In 1923, Ignatovich made his first photo report: a snapshot of writer Mikhail Zoshchenko buying apples, taken with a pocket Kodak camera at the editorial office of Smekhach. In 1925, he was restored to the ranks of the Communist Party and returned to Moscow, where he continued to work as an editor and soon joined the prominent newspaper Bednota as a press photographer, covering rural life, the peasantry, and industrial developments. His photographs began appearing in the photography magazine Sovetskoe Foto, and by the end of the decade he was working as a photographer for numerous publications, including the magazines Sovremennaia arkhitektura, Radioslushatel' and Illiustrirovannaia rabochaia gazeta.

In 1927, he participated in the photography exhibition of the Society of Friends of Soviet Cinema (Obshestvo Druzey Sovetskogo Kino - ODSK, Moscow), through which he met Alexander Rodchenko. In 1929, he was included in the landmark modernist exhibition Film und Foto (FiFo) in Vienna and Stuttgart.

== Cinematography and mid-career ==
In the 1930s, Ignatovich began to work in cinema, in particular in documentary films. In 1930, he shot the documentary film Today at the Soiuz-kinokhronika studio, with a screenplay by Esphir Shub; stills from this film were published in the magazine Kino i Zhizn' (Cinema and Life). He also participated in the creation of one of the first sound films, Olympiad of Art, and made an extensive series of aerial surveys of Leningrad from an R-5 reconnaissance plane for a special issue of USSR in Construction. In 1932–34, working as a filmmaker for Soiuzkinohronika, he shot the documentary films How the Kukryniksy Work and The Electrification of the USSR.

Together with Alexander Rodchenko, he led the photography section of the October Group, a collective of Constructivist and avant-garde artists that existed in the USSR from 1928 to 1932. In 1932, he was elected chairman of the Moscow Association of Photojournalists. He headed the department of illustrations at the newspaper Vecherniaia Moskva (Evening Moscow), and contributed to newspapers including Pravda, Rabochaya gazeta, Trud, and Komsomolskaya pravda, as well as the magazines Projector, Krasnaya niva, Ogonyok, Smena Vekh, and Soviet Photo. His work in this period included documentation of the Stakhanovite movement and a series on the Cossacks. The late 1930s also saw the formation of the so-called "Ignatovich Brigade," composed of devotees and young photographers who had studied under Ignatovich. The group included Elizar Langman, Olga Ignatovich and Elizaveta Ignatovich, and provided images for Evening Moscow and Soyuzfoto.

In 1937–38, Ignatovich's work was exhibited in the First All-Union Exhibition of Photographic Art at the Pushkin Museum in Moscow, the Russian Museum in Leningrad, and in Kiev. From 1937 to 1941, he worked as a staff photojournalist for the magazine Construction of Moscow, while continuing to cooperate with the magazine USSR in Construction. By the end of the decade, his work as being exhibited as far abroad as Lithuania and England.

== World War II ==
Ignatovich served as a military photographer on the Eastern Front during World War II, working for the newspaper Boevoe Znamia. He rode on horseback, reporting on a range of topics – including sapper squads, cavalry, snipers, scouts, front-line barbers, and field kitchens – in a variety of forms, such as chronicles, vignettes, genre scenes, and group and personal portraits.

In the last years of the war, he was sent by a studio of military photographers to the Western and Bryansk fronts, where he worked with partisan detachments. At the Potsdam Conference in 1945, he photographed Marshal Zhukov signing the Potsdam Declaration. He continued to work as a military photographer until 1950, when he was discharged with the rank of captain.

== Postwar period and death ==
After his war service, Ignatovich made his first forays into color photography. In the 1950s he worked as a photographer for Ogonyok, as well as for the publishing houses Pravda, Izogiz, Stroiizdat, and Zhurnal mod, and led technical workshops at the All-Union Agricultural Exhibition (VSKhV), where he set up a laboratory for color photography. He participated in the landmark exhibition in Moscow Photo Art of the USSR: 40 Years. He also headed a department at the publishing house Iskusstvo. In 1957, publication of the magazine Soviet Photo was resumed, and he worked briefly in the literary department. In the late 1950s and early 1960s, he supervised a photo studio in the factory Serp i molot, consulted for the photo studio club Trudovye rezervy, and led the reporting section in the country's biggest photography club, Novator, taking part in club exhibitions.

In 1969, in honor of his seventieth birthday, the Moscow branch of the Union of Soviet Journalists organized a solo exhibition of Ignatovich's work at the Central House of Journalists. The exhibition featured photographs from every period of Ignatovich's career, from 1923 through 1963, and included large-scale prints, made by Ignatovich, whose size was highly unusual for exhibitions at that time.

The last years of Ignatovich's life were spent in his communal apartment on Lenin Prospect, where young photographers would often visit to present their work and to learn from the old master. His wife and archivist, Klavdia Ignatovich, reports, "I served as an assistant, a photo model, and a cook for him. Boris Vsevolodovich was working until the very last." Ignatovich died on 4 April 1976. He is buried in Rogozhskoe Cemetery in Moscow.

Assessing his legacy after his death, the writer and historian of photography Valeriy Stigneev wrote, "He worked a frame like a sculptor, shearing off anything superfluous, and brought it to life like a movie. That's how he has entered his name in history. The epoch of Ignatovich saw photographs acquire a language of their own, an artistic expressiveness of their own. The revolution in Russia swept away the bourgeois order and the bourgeois aesthetic. The builders of a new society needed their own language and idols. On this great, fast-moving wave of art rose Mayakovsky, Rodchenko, Eisenstein, Dziga Vertov, Deineka, El Lissitsky, and others. More accurately, they made this art. Boris Ignatovich made photography."

== Selected filmography ==
- Today, 1930. Documentary film produced by the Soiuz-kinokhronika studio, Moscow. Screenplay by Esfir Shub.
- Olympiad of Art, 1930. Boris Ignatovich worked as a cameraman, alongside Dmitriy Debabov.
- How the Kukryniksy Work, 1932. Documentary film produced by the Soiuz-kinokhronika studio, Moscow.
- The Electrification of the USSR, 1934. Documentary film by director A. Egorov. Boris Ignatovich worked as a cameraman.

== Selected collections ==
- Pushkin State Museum of Fine Arts, Moscow, Russia
- Museum Ludwig, Cologne, Germany
- Art Institute of Chicago, Chicago, IL, USA
- The Museum of Fine Arts, Houston, TX, USA
- State Museum and Exhibition Centre for Photography ROSPHOTO, Saint Petersburg, Russia
- Pérez Art Museum Miami, Miami, FL, USA
- Princeton University Art Museum, Princeton, NJ, USA
- Multimedia Art Museum, Moscow, Moscow, Russia
- Richard and Ellen Sandor Art Foundation, Chicago, IL, USA
- Alex Lachmann Collection, Cologne, Germany
- Nailya Alexander Gallery New York, NY, USA
- Robert Koch Gallery, San Francisco, CA, USA
- National Gallery of Canada, Ottawa, Canada
- Merrill C. Berman Collection, Rye, NY, USA

== Major exhibitions ==
- 1929: Film und Foto. International Werkbund exhibition in the New Exhibition Hall on Interim Theatre Square. Stuttgart. Germany
- 1929: First October exhibition. Gorky Park, Moscow, Russia
- 1935: Exhibition of the Work of the Masters of Soviet Photography (Vystavka rabot masterov sovetskogo foto-iskusstva). Moscow, Russia
- 1969: Solo exhibition organized by the Union of Soviet Journalists, Central House of Journalists, Moscow, Russia
- 1981: Moscow-Paris /Paris-Moscow, 1900–1930. Pushkin Museum of Fine Arts, Moscow, Russia; Centre Pompidou, Paris, France
- 1992: The Great Utopia: the Russian Avant-Garde, 1915–1932. Solomon R. Guggenheim Museum, New York, NY, USA; State Tretyakov Gallery, Moscow, Russia; State Russian Museum, St. Petersburg, Russia; Schirn Kunsthalle Frankfurt, Germany
- 1999: Boris Ignatovich. 100 Years of Mastery. Moscow House of Photography, Moscow, Russia
- 2000–2001: Propaganda & Dreams. Photographing the 1930s in the USA and USSR. Corcoran Gallery of Art, Washington, DC, USA; International Center of Photography, New York, NY, USA; Pushkin Museum of Fine Arts, Moscow, Russia
- 2002 Boris Ignatovich: Icon of National Photography, 1927–1963. The Pushkin Museum of Fine Arts, Moscow, Russia
- 2003 Boris Ignatovich: Unknown masterpieces. The Lumiere Brothers Center for Photography. Moscow, Russia
- 2004 Sowjetische Fotografie der 1920er und 1930er Jahre. Von Piktoralismus und Modernismus zum Sozialistischen Realismus. Fotomuseum Winterthur, Switzerland
- 2011: Boris Ignatovitch: Platonov's Time. Multimedia Art Museum/Moscow House of Photography. Voronezh, Samara, Russia
- 2015-2016: The Power of Pictures: Early Soviet Photography, Early Soviet Film. Jewish Museum, New York, USA
- 2017: Revolution: Russian Art 1917–1932. Royal Academy of Arts. Burlington House, Piccadilly, London

== See also ==
- Constructivism (art)
- Russian avant-garde
