= FC Tekstilshchik Ivanovo =

Russian football club

Tekstilshchik
- Full name: FC Tekstilshchik Ivanovo
- Founded: 1937; 89 years ago
- Ground: Tekstilshchik Stadium, Ivanovo
- Capacity: 9,565
- Owner: Ivanovo Oblast
- General director: Aleksandr Gushchin
- Manager: Dmitri Pyatibratov
- League: Russian First League
- 2025–26: Russian Second League, Division A, Gold Group, Second stage: 2nd (promoted)
- Website: fc-textil.ru
Home colours	Away colours

The historical logo

FC Tekstilshchik Ivanovo (Russian: ФК «Текстильщик» Иваново) is a Russian association football club based in the city of Ivanovo, playing in the second-tier Russian First League. It enjoyed second tier-membership in the Soviet and Russian football leagues in 1939, 1945 to 1962, 1965 to 1974, 1983, 1992, 1993, 2007 and from 2019 to 2022.

== Team name history ==
- 1937–1938 Spartak Ivanovo
- 1939–1943 Osnova Ivanovo
- 1944–1946 Dynamo Ivanovo
- 1947–1957 Krasnoye Znamya Ivanovo
- 1958–1998 Tekstilshchik Ivanovo
- 1999–2000 FC Ivanovo
- 2001–2003 Tekstilshchik Ivanovo
- 2004–2007 Tekstilshchik-Telekom Ivanovo (FC Spartak-Telekom Shuya merged with Tekstilschik in 2004)
- 2008–present Tekstilshchik Ivanovo

== Current squad ==
As of 11 September 2026, according to the First League website.

Note: Flags indicate national team as defined under FIFA eligibility rules; some limited exceptions apply. Players may hold more than one non-FIFA nationality.

No.	Pos.	Nation	Player
2	DF	RUS	Aleksandr Gapechkin
3	DF	RUS	Daniil Marugin
7	MF	RUS	Abdullo Dzhebov
11	MF	RUS	Maksim Kriushichev
17	FW	RUS	Artyom Mikhaylusov
18	MF	RUS	Ivan Ivanov
19	MF	RUS	Maksim Noskov
20	MF	UKR	Oleksandr Rosputko
21	MF	UKR	Dmytro Ivanisenya (on loan from Krylia Sovetov Samara)
23	DF	RUS	Dmitry Ivannikov
25	MF	RUS	Yegor Gulyayev
27	DF	RUS	Artyom Krutovskikh (on loan from Nizhny Novgorod)
29	FW	RUS	Kirill Nikitin
30	MF	RUS	Denis Simonov

No.	Pos.	Nation	Player
46	MF	RUS	Nikita Pershin (on loan from Krylia Sovetov Samara)
50	DF	RUS	Danil Pyatibratov
55	DF	RUS	Vadim Gapeyev
58	GK	RUS	Semyon Fadeyev (on loan from Nizhny Novgorod)
63	DF	RUS	Aleksei Nikitenkov
66	DF	RUS	Yury Petin
74	DF	RUS	Yegor Guziyev (on loan from Spartak Moscow)
77	FW	RUS	Stanislav Biblyk
78	MF	RUS	Artyom Korneyev (on loan from Lokomotiv Moscow)
83	MF	RUS	Nikolay Ishchenko (on loan from Nizhny Novgorod)
87	FW	RUS	Arseny Filyov
91	FW	RUS	Aleksandr Pomalyuk (on loan from Spartak Moscow)
95	GK	RUS	Mikhail Volkov

=== Out on loan ===
Note: Flags indicate national team as defined under FIFA eligibility rules; some limited exceptions apply. Players may hold more than one non-FIFA nationality.

No. / Pos. / Nation / Player; — / MF / RUS / Vitaly Dunay (at Pobeda Nizhny Novgorod until 31 December 2026)	No. / Pos. / Nation / Player; — / FW / RUS / David Gagua (at Salyut Belgorod until 31 December 2026)

== Notable players ==
Abdou Jammeh was a Gambia international during his spell at Tekstilshchik.

== Mascot ==
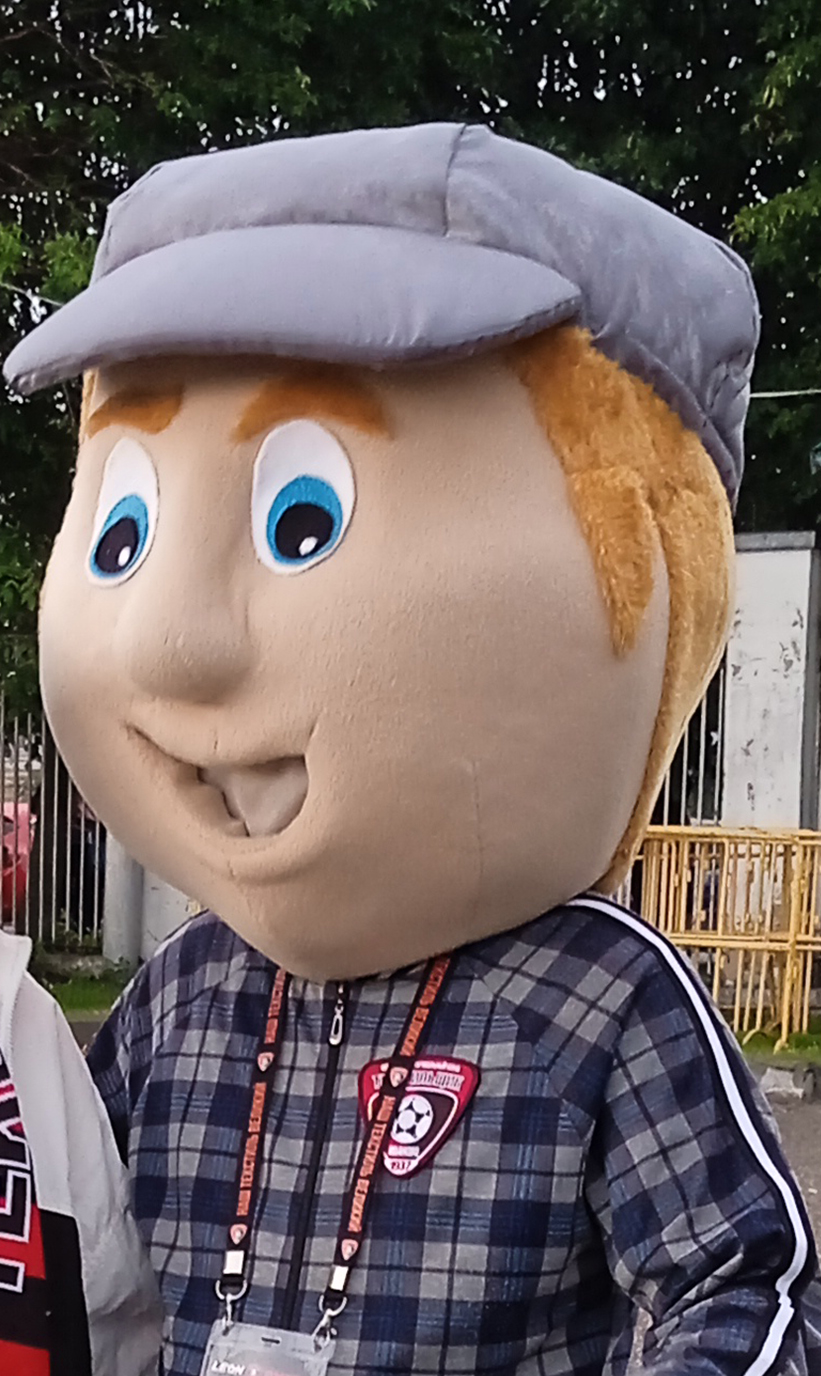
Vanek

The mascot of FC Tekstilshchik is a boy doll named Vanek.

Vanek has supported the Ivanovo team since 2022. Vanek is a yard hooligan and Tekstilshchik fan, depicted as smiling, wearing a cap, and putting his hands in his pockets. His clothes are intended to resemble early 20th-century English workers. The name of the character corresponds to the name of the city, which emphasizes the proximity to the region.
