= Antanas Sutkus =

Lithuanian photographer

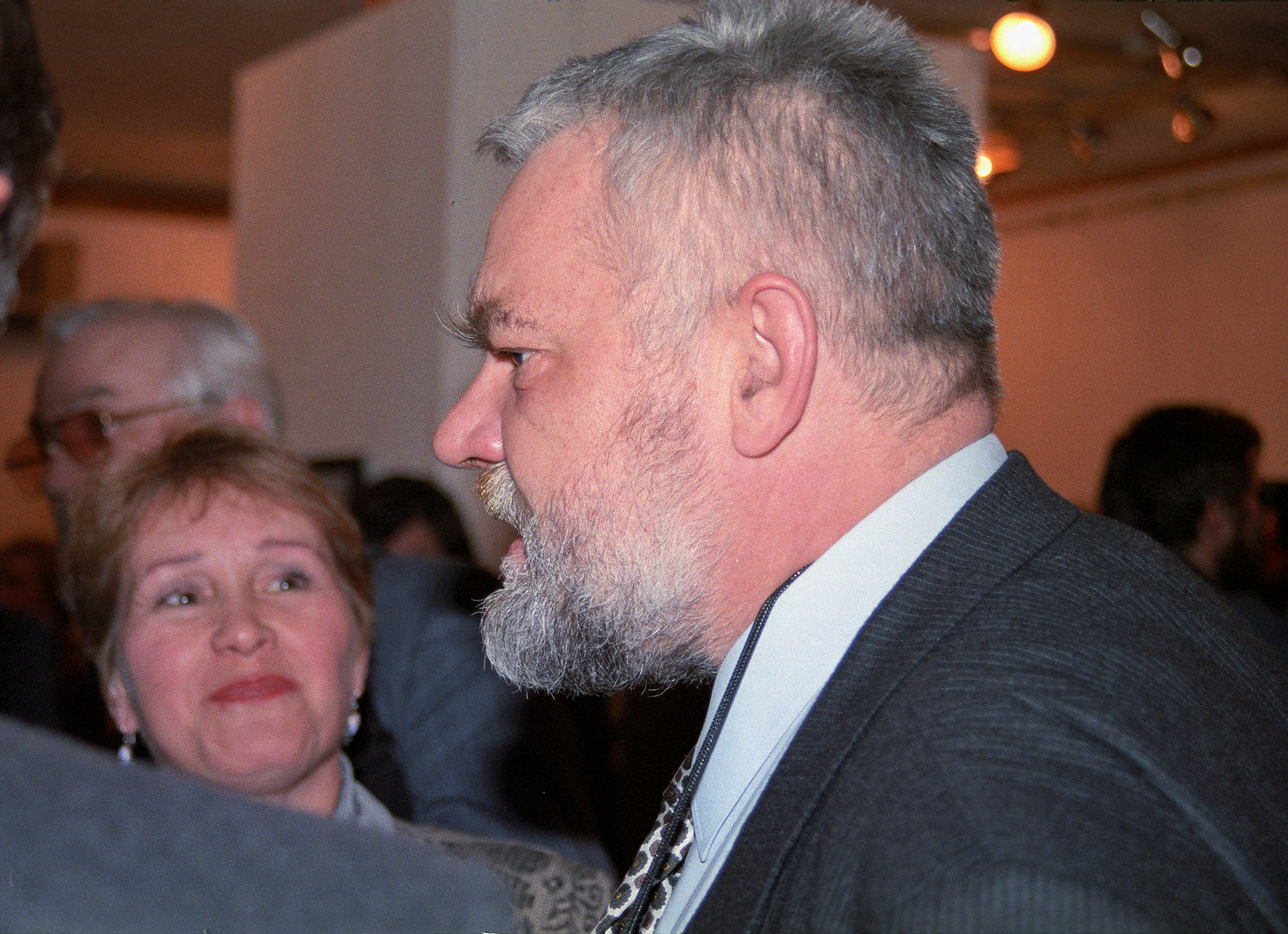
Sutkus in 1996

Antanas Sutkus (born 27 June 1939) is a Lithuanian photographer.

Sutkus is a recipient of the Lithuanian National Prize for Culture and Arts, the Order of the Lithuanian Grand Duke Gediminas, and the Dr. Erich Salomon Award. He was one of the co-founders and a president of the Lithuanian Association of Art Photographers (Lithuanian: Lietuvos fotografijos meno draugija).

== Life and work ==
Sutkus was born on 27 June 1939 in Kluoniškiai, Kaunas district, Lithuania.

He studied journalism at Vilnius University in the late 1950s; at the time the Lithuanian SSR was part of the Soviet Union. He became disillusioned by the confines of the Soviet-controlled press and began taking photographs, wanting to find a way to make his camera "a weapon for the underground" in portraying resistance to the USSR.

Sutkus concentrated on black and white portraits of ordinary people in their everyday life rather than the model citizens and workers promoted by Soviet propaganda. He photographed children, who represented a kind of freedom: "Children have a world with its own laws, rules, its own happiness and sadness. To enter it, you need to feel that you are a kid. Adults and children are different stories." A series of mid-1960s portraits of children, often with adults in the shot pointedly faceless and irrelevant, was collected in a 2020 book. He took a photograph that became famous of a communist "Young Pioneer" boy with shaven head and very sad expression which got him called before the central committee and denounced as "photography's Solzhenitsyn".

He co-founded the Lithuanian Association of Art Photographers in 1969. He is well known for his life-long survey, People of Lithuania, begun in 1976 to document the changing life and people of the Lithuanian SSR.

Sutkus had an opportunity to spend time with Jean-Paul Sartre and Simone de Beauvoir in 1965 when they visited Lithuania. One image, taken against the white sand of Nida, is highly regarded as capturing Sartre's ideas.

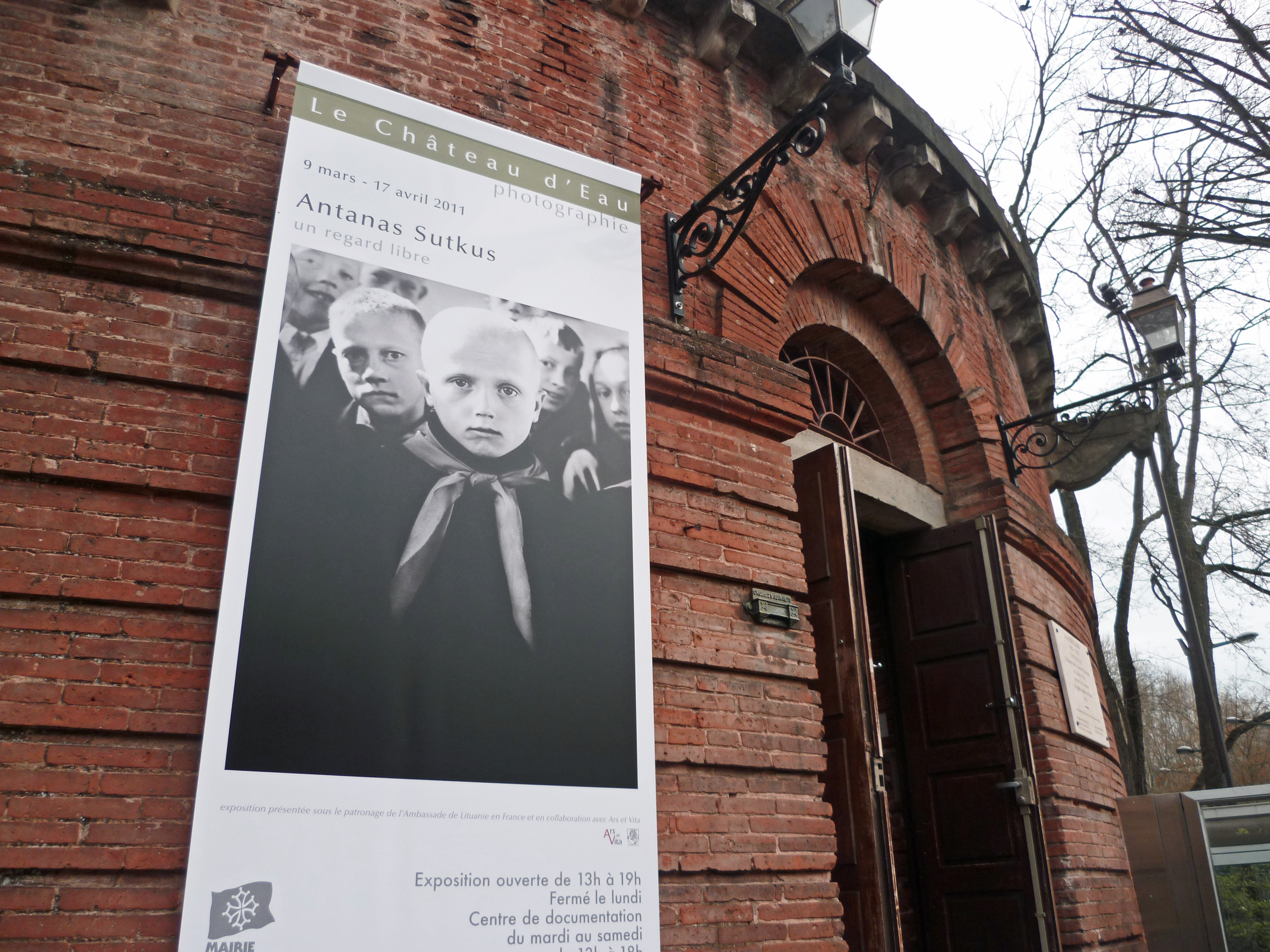
Exhibition of Sutkus's work at Le château d’eau, pôle photographique de Toulouse, France, 2011

== Publications ==
- Neringa. Vilnius: Mintis, 1982. OCLC 11114726. Text in English, German, Lithuanian, and Russian.
- Lietuva = Lithuaniua. Vilnius: Lietuvos Fotomeninink Sąjungos Fondas, 1992. OCLC 442398420. Edited and with a text by Alfred Bumblauskas.
- Antanas Sutkus: Fotografijos: 1959-1999 = Antanas Sutkus: Photographs: 1959-1999. Vilnius: Baltos lankos, 2000. ISBN 9789955000242.
- Retrospektyva = Retrospective. Vilnius: Sapna Sala, 2009. ISBN 9789955611417.
- Lithuanian Portraits. With a text by Nadim Julien Samman. Accompanied an exhibition at White Space Gallery, London, and Signs of Time Gallery, Moscow.
- People of Lithuania. Kaunas, Lithuania: Kaunas Photography Gallery; Lithuanian Photographer's Association, 2015. ISBN 9786098099096. With a preface by William A. Ewing and an essay by Margarita Matulytė. Edited by Gintaras Česonis in cooperation with Ewing, Jean-Marc Lacabe and Margarita Matulytė.
- In Memoriam. London: White Space Gallery, 2016. With a text by Alfonsas Bukontas.
- Sutkus, Antanas (2020). Children. Göttingen: Steidl GmbH & Co. OHG. ISBN 978-3-95829-709-8. OCLC 1135366689.

== Awards ==
- 1997: Order of the Lithuanian Grand Duke Gediminas.
- 2003: Lithuanian National Prize for Culture and Arts
- 2017: Dr. Erich Salomon Award

== Exhibitions ==
- Un Regard Libre, Le château d’eau, pôle photographique de Toulouse, Toulouse, France, March–April 2011.
- Nostalgia for Bare Feet, The Lumiere Brothers Center for Photography, Moscow, April–May 2016.
