= People's correspondent =

Amateur worker peasant and journalists in the Soviet Union

People's correspondents were amateur worker peasant and journalists since the early years of the Soviet Union. Originally initiated by Vladimir Lenin as a tool for exposing mismanagement and corruption, several million people worked as people's correspondents in their heyday. At the 17th Party Congress in 1934, Joseph Stalin said there were more than 3 million worker and peasant correspondents.

== History ==
The tradition of people's correspondents—including worker correspondents, known as rabkors (for "rabochy korrespondent"), and peasant correspondents (sometimes called village correspondents), known as selkors (for "selskokhozyaistvenny or selsky korrespondent")—began shortly after the Bolsheviks seized power. In his 1918 article, On the character of our newspapers, Vladimir Lenin urged newspapermen to "expose the unfit" and unmask the "actual malefactors" who disrupted production and political work.

The 8th Party Congress, meeting in March 1919, endorsed the use of worker and peasant correspondents to monitor the bureaucracy and expose abuse of power. In 1919, Lenin instructed the Pravda editorial board to organize a network of regular worker and village correspondents, and by 1926, Leon Trotsky was addressing 580 delegates representing around 500,000 rabkory and selkory at the Third All-Union Congress of Rabkory.

=== Main goals ===
In the years 1923–1924, all high circulation Soviet newspapers were organizing a regular body of worker and peasant correspondents. These were supposed to be ordinary working people who would write into the newspapers regularly. Officials in the Communist Party hoped that the correspondents would expose corrupt local officials, provide information on popular moods, and help to mobilize opinion behind the Bolshevik regime. They also hoped to use the worker and peasant correspondents movement as a tool to educate a new worker/peasant intelligentsia. In pursuit of all of these goals Soviet newspaper editors and journalists during the 1920s and 1930s instructed their worker and village correspondents on appropriate themes and language for their letters.

=== The typical correspondent ===
A high proportion of correspondents were low level Party officials, trade union activists, or representatives of factory management. An ordinary worker correspondent might, e.g., also be a member of a local Party committee. Other worker correspondents belonged to trade union factory committees, provincial trade union Departments of Labor, or cooperative administration. Some of the letters by the correspondents were typed—indicating that the author probably had access to a typewriter at a government office.

=== Instruction ===
Newspapers used a number of channels to instruct worker and village correspondents in the 1920s. The lessons themselves were haphazard and of uneven quality, but instructional materials were distributed widely. According to a Central Committee Press Department survey done in late 1923, Soviet trade union and so called mass worker newspapers used articles, conferences, individual letters, circulars, and roving instructors to inform worker and village correspondents what and how to write. In addition, newspapers published regular instructional journals for the correspondents. One of the instructional journals were the Pravda's Raboche-krest'ianskii korrespondent.

Party leaders pushed newspapers and local Party organizations to instruct correspondents in part because they saw the movement as a tool for the education of a new Soviet intelligentsia of workers and peasants. As a number of scholars have noted, the worker and village correspondents movement served as a kind of "university" where young activists from the laboring masses learned to speak the official language of the Soviet state. Both the organizers of the correspondents movement and the participants were aware of this function. Newspapers instructed correspondents in the use of the new Bolshevik vocabulary, while would-be Party members and activists imitated official discourse in their letters and expressed their desire to learn it thoroughly.

=== Ideological supervision ===
Party authorities solicited letters from worker correspondents in order to instruct them in Bolshevik language and ideology. Through written and oral interaction with newspaper editors, instructors, and Party agitators, activists would master the language of the Soviet state. The Bolshevik leaders conceived of the correspondents movement as a classroom in which rank-and-file members of the Party or the Komsomol would learn Marxism-Leninism. Indeed, not just activists eager to learn official language, but even denouncers attempting to put the state apparatus to their own uses were forced to use official rhetoric and socio-political categories to achieve their goals. Those who wished to manipulate the Bolshevik state had to speak its language.

== Literature ==
- Carl Schreck, "Proletarian Bloggers Celebrate a Milestone", the Moscow Times, July 3, 2006.
- Letter-Writing and the State: Reader Correspondence with Newspapers as a Source for Early Soviet History, by Mathew E. Lenoe, in the Cahiers du monde russe 40, Nos. 1–2 (January–June 1999), pp. 139–170.
- Peter Kenez, The Birth of the Propaganda State: Soviet methods of mass mobilization, 1917–1929, Cambridge: Cambridge University Press, 1985.
- Jeffrey Brooks, "Public and private values in the Soviet press, 1921–1928", in the Slavic Review, Vol 48, No. 1 (Spring 1989).
- Michael Gorham, Tongue-tied writers: The Rabsel'kor Movement and the Voice of the 'New Intelligentsiia' in Early Soviet Russia, in The Russian Review, Vol. 55 (July 1996): pp. 412–429.
- Steven Coe, Peasants, the State, and the Languages of NEP: The Rural Correspondents' Movement in the Soviet Union, 1924–1928, Ph.D. diss., University of Michigan, 1993.
- Julie Kay Mueller, A New Kind of Newspaper: The Origins and Development of a Soviet Institution, 1921–1928 pp. 264–315, Ph.D. diss., University of California/Berkeley, 1992.
- Matthew Lenoe, Stalinist Mass Journalism and the Transformation of Soviet Newspapers, 1926–1932, Ph.D. diss., University of Chicago, 1997.
