= Sheila Metzner =

American photographer (born 1939)

- Born: 1939 (age 86–87); New York City, United States
- Education: Pratt Institute
- Spouse: Jeffrey Metzner
- Children: 5

Sheila Metzner (born 1939) is an American photographer. She was the first female photographer to collaborate with Vogue magazine on an ongoing basis. Metzner lives in Brooklyn, New York.

== Early life ==
Metzner graduated from the High School of Art and Design and the Faculty of Visual Communications of the Pratt Institute. In the 1960s, she became the first woman to be promoted to art director by Doyle Dane Bernbach, an advertising agency. Thanks to this, she successfully collaborated with well-known photographers, including Richard Avedon, Melvin Sokolsky, Bob Richardson and Diane Arbus.

== Art career ==
Metzner's first show in New York was called Friends & Family. She decided to show part of the images to the director of the Museum of Modern Art in New York, John Sarkovsky. In 1978, he bought one and included in MoMA exhibition Mirrors and Windows: American Photography Since 1960.

A second exhibition – Photography (Spring 1981): Couches, Diamonds and Pie – took place there. After that, The New York Times and The Sunday Times published a photograph of Metzner's husband.

In 2008, the School of Visual Arts presented the exhibition Time Line: Shelia Metzner at the Visual Arts Museum, New York.

== Collections ==
- Museum of Modern Art, New York
- Metropolitan Museum of Art
- Brooklyn Museum
- Museum of Fine Arts Houston
- Getty Museum

== Personal life ==
She was married to painter and art director Jeffrey Metzner for forty-four years. They had five children.
