= Arno Rafael Minkkinen =

Finnish-American photographer

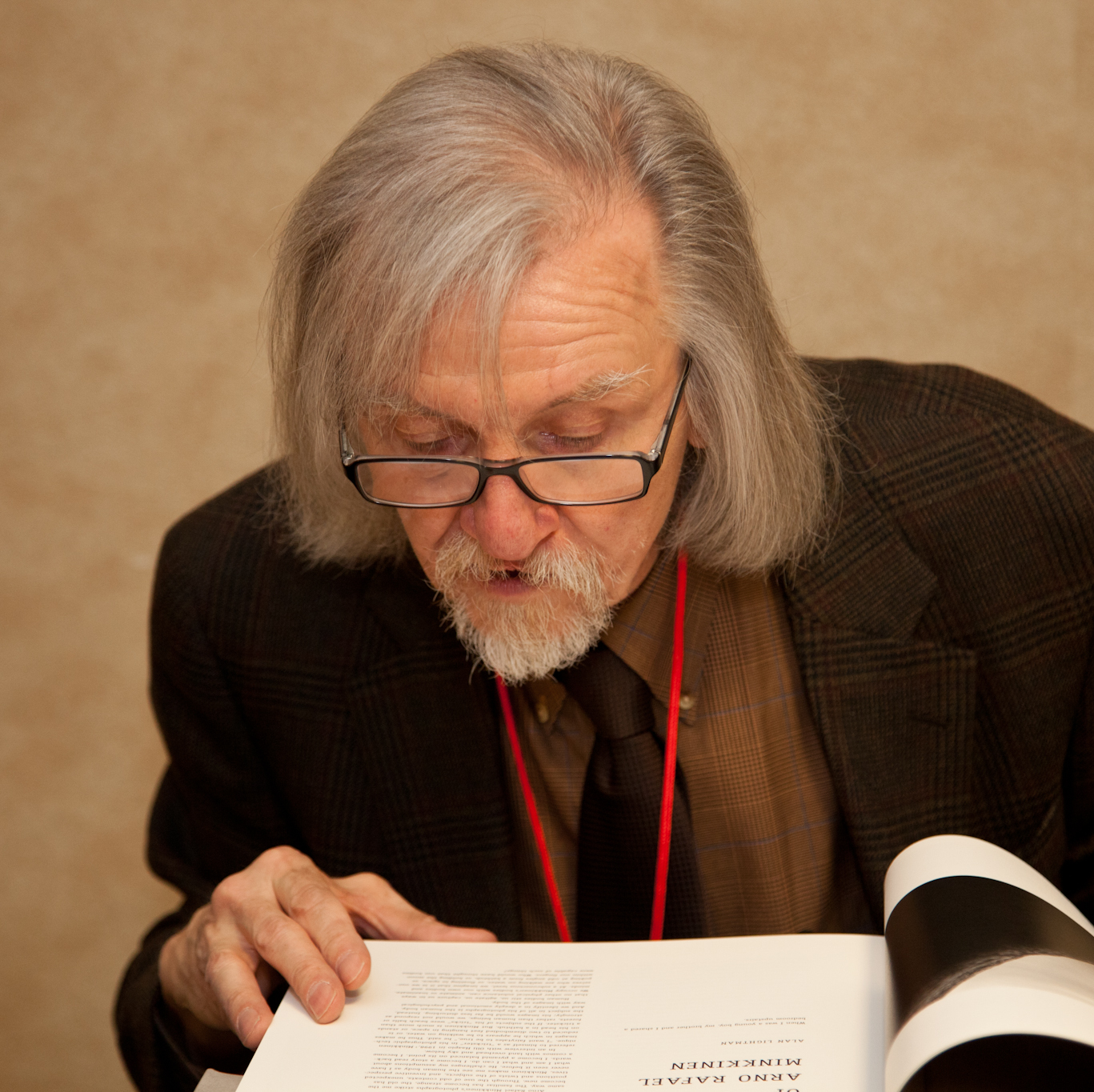
- Arno Rafael Minkkinen, 2011
- Born: 4 June 1945 (age 81); Helsinki, Finland
- Education: Wagner College; Rhode Island School of Design
- Occupation: Photographer
- Honours: Order of the Lion of Finland (Knight, First Class)

Arno Rafael Minkkinen (born 4 June 1945) is a Finnish-American photographer who works in the United States.

Published and exhibited worldwide, Minkkinen's work can be found in the collections of the Museum of Fine Arts, Boston and the Finnish Museum of Photography.

Seven solo monographs on his work have been published: Frostbite (1978), Waterline (1994, winner of the 25th Rencontres d'Arles Book Prize), Body Land (1999), SAGA: The Journey of Arno Rafael Minkkinen, 35 Years of Photographs (2005), Homework: The Finnish Photographs (2008), Swimming in the Air (2009), and Balanced Equation (2010). The retrospective survey SAGA premiered at the DeCordova Museum in Lincoln, MA, in 2005. The 120-print retrospective toured to Romania, Slovakia, Finland, Italy, China, and Canada.

Minkkinen was made a Knight of the Order of the Lion of Finland of the first class by the Finnish government in 1992, and awarded the Finnish State Art Prize in Photography in 2006.

== Early life and education ==
Minkkinen was born in Helsinki, Finland in 1945 and emigrated to the United States in 1951. He graduated from Wagner College with a Bachelor of Arts in English Literature, and began taking self-portraits in 1971, while working as an advertising copywriter on Madison Avenue in New York. He later studied with Harry Callahan and Aaron Siskind at Rhode Island School of Design and earned his Master of Fine Arts degree in photography in 1974.

== Career ==
Over the past four decades, Minkkinen has been engaged as a teacher, curator, and writer while continuing to devote his photographic research and energies to the self-portrait.

=== Teaching activities ===
Minkkinen is a professor of art at the University of Massachusetts Lowell, and also serves as lecturer at Aalto University of Art & Design Helsinki. Earlier in his teaching career he served as assistant professor at M.I.T., Visiting Artist at Philadelphia College of Art (now University of the Arts (Philadelphia)), the École d'Arts Appliqués in Vevey, Switzerland, and as graduate faculty at Maine Media College in Rockport, Maine.

Since joining UMass Lowell in 1987, Minkkinen has taken students to Finland and Russia (1988), and Czechoslovakia (1989). In 1996, in a collaborative UMass Lowell/Lahti Institute of Design (Lahti, Finland) exchange program called Spirit Level, thirty Finnish, American, and Swiss students toured through Finland, Russia, and Eastern Europe for three weeks with Minkkinen and photo department head at Lahti, Timo Laaksonen. Among the students at the time was Mark Eshbaugh who later became an adjunct professor at UMass Lowell. Seven years after the first Spirit Level, together with Timo Laaksonen and Mark Eshbaugh a professor at Umass Lowell at that time, Tuscany in Italy (2003) and Oaxaca, Mexico (2007) were added to the program. Later Minkinnen organized collaborations with Aalto University in Helsinki, Finland and the Foundation Studio Marangoni in Florence, Italy (2010) as well as the Bilder Nordic School of Photography in Oslo and the École Supérieure d'Arts & Medias de Caen/Cherbourg in France (2012) for an American Road Trip to the studio farmlands of American photographer Sally Mann. The first three workshops resulted in the publication of a book commemorating those first three experiences.

Minkkinen has taught workshops worldwide, particularly at the Maine Photographic Workshops (now Maine Media Workshops), Maine Media College (as part of the graduate faculty), the Art Institute of Boston at Lesley University, Anderson Ranch in Colorado, Santa Fe Workshops in New Mexico, the Friends of Photography in Carmel, California, and in Europe at the Rencontres d'Arles in Arles, France, the Toscana Photographic Workshops in Tuscany, Italy, as well as workshop programs in Finland, Norway, Luxembourg, and China. Minkkinen served a second four-year term as national board member of the Society of Photographic Education (2008 to 2016).

=== Recent work ===
Since 2009, Minkkinen has developed a growing interest in feature filmmaking and screenwriting. In 2010, he received a first round of support from the Finnish Film Foundation for a screenplay he had written and will be directing. Filming was planned in Finnish Karelia and Finntown, Brooklyn. The demo preview of The Rain House was screened at the Film Society of Lincoln Center's Elinor Bunin Munroe Film Center in connection with the Dance Films Association's 41st Dance on Camera Festival (2013). As of 2021 the film was in the making.

== Publications ==
=== Monographs and curated anthologies ===
- Frostbite. Morgan & Morgan, Dobbs Ferry, New York. ISBN 978-0-87100-143-6.
- New American Nudes: Recent Trends & Attitudes. Morgan & Morgan, Dobbs Ferry, NY. MIT Creative Photography Gallery.
- Elegant Intimacy. Retretti Art Center, Punkaharju, Finland. With J. H. Lartigue and Sally Mann. Also Harry Callahan, Emmet Gowin, Claude Batho, Yves Tremorin, Roman Vishniac, and Alfred Stieglitz.
- Waterline. Marval, Paris; Otava, Helsinki; Aperture, New York, 1993. ISBN 978-0-89381-648-3. Grand Prix du Livre, 25th Rencontres d'Arles Photography Festival.
- The Waterline Portfolio. Aperture Foundation.
- Ten Minutes Past Midnight. Musta Taide, Helsinki, Finland.
- Body Land. (Motta, Milan, 1997; Nathan, Paris, 1988), Smithsonian Institution Press, Washington, D.C., 1999. ISBN 978-1-56098-880-9.
- SAGA: The Journey of Arno Rafael Minkkinen, Thirty Years of Photographs. Chronicle Books, San Francisco, 2005. ISBN 978-0-8118-5146-6. Essay by A. D. Coleman.
- Swimming in the Air. Cavallo Point at Golden Gate National Park, San Francisco.
- SAGA: The Journey of Arno Rafael Minkkinen. SEE+ Art Space Gallery, Beijing.
- Homework / Suomen Kuvat, The Finnish Photographs of Arno Rafael Minkkinen, 1973 to 2008. Like Publishing, Helsinki, 2008. ISBN 978-952-01-0108-4.
- Arno Rafael Minkkinen. See+ Art Space Gallery. Beijing, China. 30 postcards in book form.
- Balanced Equation. Lodima Press Portfolio Series.

=== Publications with contributions by Minkkinen ===
- Timo Laaksonen and Arno Rafael Minkkinen. In Spirit of the Masters. Keravan Taidomuseo 2000. ISBN 978-952-9642-23-6. He is co-editor and has images included.

=== Critical writings, essays and fiction ===
- Minkkinen, Arno Rafael, Frostbite, Morgan & Morgan, Dobbs Ferry, New York. 1981.
- Minkkinen, Arno Rafael, New American Nudes: Recent Trends & Attitudes, Morgan & Morgan, Dobbs Ferry, New York. 1981.
- Minkkinen, Arno Rafael, "From the Prow." Finnice, Camera International. 1991.
- Minkkinen, Arno Rafael, "The Lens of Love," Elegant Intimacy, Retretti Art Center, Punkaharju, Finland. 1993.
- Minkkinen, Arno Rafael, Waterline Marval (Paris), Aperture (New York), Otava (Helsinki), 1994.
- Minkkinen, Arno Rafael, "Baudelaire's Brow, Reflections on the photographs of Karin Rosenthal. Karin Rosenthal, Danforth Museum of Art, Framingham, Massachusetts. 2000.
- Minkkinen, Arno Rafael, "Take Out My Eyes," In the Spirit of the Masters, Kerava Art Museum, Kerava, Finland, 2000. pp. 66–79.
- Minkkinen, Arno Rafael, "Treasures of the Moment: Thirty years of Polaroid Photography in Boston, Photography in Boston 1955–1985, DeCordova Museum and Sculpture Park, Lincoln, Massachusetts. MIT Press, Cambridge, 2000. Chapter text pp. 135–153.
- Minkkinen, Arno Rafael, "First Frames First." exposure, Society for Photographic Education. Vol. 35. Fall 2001.
- Minkkinen, Arno Rafael. Balanced Equation. Lodima Press, Revere, Pennsylvania, 2010.
- Minkkinen, Arno Rafael. "Faith in Happenstance." American Faith. Photographs by Christopher Churchill. Nazraeli Press, Portland, 2011.
- Minkkinen, Arno Rafael. "The Morning of Childhood." Faces. Photographs by William Ropp. Maison européenne de la photographie, 2011.
- Minkkinen, Arno Rafael. "The Horsepower of Desire." Surrounded by No One. Photographs by Margaret M. de Lange. Trolley Books, London, 2011.

== Film and television ==
- Still Not There. Finnish Public Television, 1996: 52-minute documentary on the life and works of Arno Rafael Minkkinen. Directed by Kimmo Koskela. Finnish Emmy Award entry, 1996.
- Art Close Up: Boston Photography: 1955–1985. WGBH-TV Channel 2 Boston: 7-minute segment on A.R. Minkkinen as part of DeCordova Museum exhibition, Boston Photographers: 1955–1985. Produced, directed by Marty Ostrow. 1999.
- EGG: The Art Show. PBS/ Channel 13, New York. 30-minute segment with Cindy Sherman, Bruce Gilden, Ernest Withers, and Arno Rafael Minkkinen: "Who Am I?" 2000.
- Art Close Up: Photography & Reality. WGBH-TV Channel 2, Boston. Produced by Ben Mayer. 2004.
- Arno Rafael Minkkinen: 40 Years of Self-Portraits. DVD with Still Not There, 2010 interview, and 172- image slideshow produced and directed by Kimmo Koskela.

== Awards ==
- 1991 National Endowment for the Arts Regional Fellowship
- 1992 Order of the Lion First Class, conferred by the Finnish government
- 1994 Grand Prix du Livre, 25th Rencontres d'Arles Photography Festival
- 1996 Scritture d'Acqua Prize (given in Literature, Art, & Science), Italy
- 1996 Still Not There. Finland's Emmy Award entry
- 1997 Still Not There. Prize of Honor. Art Film Triennial, Kalmar, Sweden
- 1998 Still Not There. Silver Key, 6th International Art Film Festival. Geraldine Chaplin, juror. Bratislava, Slovak Republic
- 2006 Finnish Photographic Arts Council Book Grant
- 2006 Lianzhou International Photo Festival Special Jury Prize for SAGA, Lianzhou, China
- 2006 Finnish State Art Prize in Photography
- 2008 Finnish Film Foundation grant for re-edit of Still Not There
- 2010 Finnish Film Foundation Grant for The Rain House Screenplay
- 2011 Nancy Donahue Professor of Art Award

== Solo exhibitions ==
- 1972 New York: Soho Photo Gallery. Freemale.
- 1972 Tucson, Arizona: Apeiron Traveling Exhibition. Spectrum Gallery.
- 1973 Copenhagen: Gallery for Creative Photography. White Underpants.
- 1974 Helsinki, Finland: Photographic Museum of Finland.
- 1976 Stockholm: Fotografiska Museet at Moderna Museet.
- 1979 Andover, Massachusetts: Addison Gallery of American Art. Frostbite.
- 1984 Helsinki: Photographic Museum of Finland.
- 1984 Reims, France: Maison de la Culture.
- 1986 Pori, Finland: Pori Art Museum. Mattomies.
- 1991 Barcelona: Centre d'Art Santa Monica. Primordial Image.
- 1991 Nice: Museum of Modern Art. Retrospective: Finnice.
- 1992 Prague: Prague House of Photography.
- 1993 Toulouse: Galerie du Château d'Eau.
- 1995 Pori, Finland: Pori Art Museum. Retrospective. Waterline.
- 1995 Lausanne, Switzerland: Musée de l'Élysée;
- 1995 Caen, France: L'Artothèque de Caen and Musée de Normandie.
- 1996 Waterline. Sundsvall, Sweden: Sundsvall Museet.
- 1996 Waterline. Odense, Denmark: Museet for Fotokunst, Brandts Klædefabrik.
- 1996 Waterline. Charleroi, Belgium: Musée de la Photographie.
- 1998 Paris: Mois de la Photo; Helsinki: Gallen Kallela Museum.
- 2000 Tokyo, Japan: Tokyo Metropolitan Museum of Photography. Retrospective in the exhibition: The Body as an Expression of the Subconscious.
- 2003 New York: .
- 2005 Lincoln, Massachusetts: DeCordova Museum and Sculpture Park.SAGA: The Journey of Arno Rafael Minkkinen, Thirty-Five Years of Photographs.
- 2006 SAGA: The Journey of Arno Rafael Minkkinen, Thirty-Five Years of Photographs. Quimper, Brittany: Mai-Photographies. Galerie Saluden: Le Corps Du Photographe.
- 2006 SAGA: The Journey of Arno Rafael Minkkinen, Thirty-Five Years of Photographs. Bucharest Museum of Contemporary Art.
- 2006 SAGA: The Journey of Arno Rafael Minkkinen, Thirty-Five Years of Photographs. Bratislava, Slovakia: Palace of Art, Month of Photography.
- 2006 Lianzhou (Guangdong Province) China: 2nd Lianzhou International Photography Festival.
- 2007 Salo, Finland: Salo Art Museum. SAGA: The Journey of Arno Rafael Minkkinen, Thirty-Five Years of Photographs.
- 2007 Malmö, Sweden: Malmö Museet. Fotografi i Fokus Festival.
- 2008 HOMEWORK: Suomen Kuvat/The Finnish Photographs, 1973 to 2008.
- 2008 SAGA: The Journey of Arno Rafael Minkkinen, Thirty-Five Years of Photographs. Beijing, China: SEE+ Art Space Gallery.
- 2008 Correggio / Reggio Emilia, Italy: Palazzo Principi.
- 2009 Winnipeg, Canada: Winnipeg Art Gallery. SAGA: The Journey of Arno Rafael Minkkinen, Thirty-Five Years of Photographs.
- 2009 Lincoln, Nebraska: Sheldon Art Museum (Evolving Eden: Three Photographic Perspectives with Edward Burtnysky + Hans Ejkelboom).
- 2009 San Francisco: Cavallo Point, Golden Gate National Park at Fort Baker
- 2009 Lahti, Finland: Lahti Art Museum. HOMEWORK: The Finnish Photographs, 1973 to 2008.
- 2009 Paris: Finnish Footprints: 70 / 08, The Finnish Institute.
- 2009 Brussels: Valérie Bach Gallery.
- 2010 Shanghai: Finnish Pavilion. Shanghai World's Fair.
- 2011 Cortona, Italy: A Sentimental Journey. Cortona On the Move Festival.
- 2011 Caen, France: Arno Rafael Minkkinen. Les Boréales de Normandy. Paris Metro. Finnish National Tourist Board.
- 2012 Athens: Palindromes. Phototheatron/Athens House of Photography.
- 2013 New York: A Dance of Light. Furman Gallery. Dance on Camera Festival, Lincoln Center.

== Collections ==
Minkkinen's work is held in the following permanent collections:

- Finnish Museum of Photography
- Museum of Fine Arts, Boston, Massachusetts
