= Vadim Gushchin =

Russian art-photographer (born 1963)

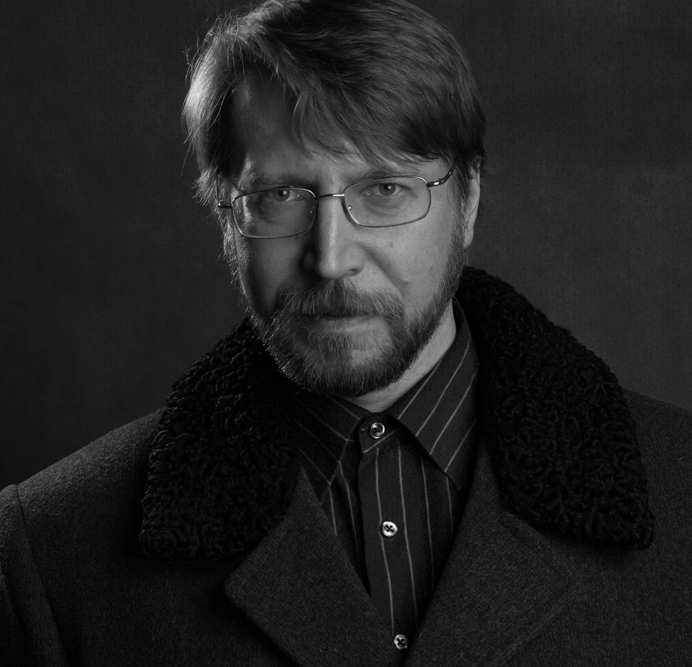
- Born: 1963 (age 61–62); Novosibirsk, Russia
- Occupation: Photographer
- Website: vadimgushchin.com

Vadim Gushchin (Russian: Гущин, Вадим Витальевич) (born 1963) is a Russian art-photographer.

== Biography ==
Gushchin was born in Novosibirsk in 1963. He is known primarily for his work, made in the genre of post-conceptual still life. In 1986, he graduated at the Moscow Energy Institute. He has been creating artistic photography since 1988. He lives and works in Moscow.

Russian art photographer Vadim Gushchin, who combines minimalist, conceptualist, and abstract strategies, is also entwined with two crucial aspects of Russian art that are inseparable from the nation's identity and history. He photographs the most mundane objects from his (and our) daily life, each in series: books, envelopes, pills, packages, bread. Photographers from Stephen Shore to Gabriel Orozco have also photographed the least imposing elements in our homes— a plate, a pail, a table mat— but Gushchin manages to transpose the globally recognizable, inconsequential, disposable fragments of life into pristine artifacts of art, more beautiful in their spare perfection than reproductions of his work suggest. - Vicky Goldberg, writer, photography and art, Boston.

Vadim Gushchin 's elegant photographs pay homage to the dignity and richness everyday objects both in their very materials and in their roles as repositories of a collective culture. In the tradition of Russian supremacism his compositions are reduced to their most essential aspects of geometric form and color, however, his luxurious treatment of surface textures brings a warmth to the work that is completely his own. – Jennifer Norback, gallerist, Chicago.

When constructing a composition out of objects, Gushchin experiments with abstract colour relationships – in the gaping emptiness of the space of soaring, the heroes in his still-lifes are estranged from all earthly things, like the colour planes of Suprematist compositions. Gushchin's photography reveals the fundamental duality of culture: the abstract nature of objects in it and the specificity of colour. – Konstantin Bokhorov, PhD, Moscow.

Vadim Gushchin balances on the thin edge of the object-objectless. The world of ideas – is the world of Malevich. The space of objects – is the space of consumerism. By putting objects from the supermarket into Malevich's cosmos, Gushchin returns them to that place from whence they once came. To the primordial void. To the space of pure ideas. This is an image that does not constrain us in any particular way, it does not overwhelm us with many details, but you see some very small thing and this little thing is capable of triggering in you large volumes of memory. That is, they are photographs that work with that cultural memory and that time which we envelop. – Mikhail Sidlin, Art-critic, Moscow.

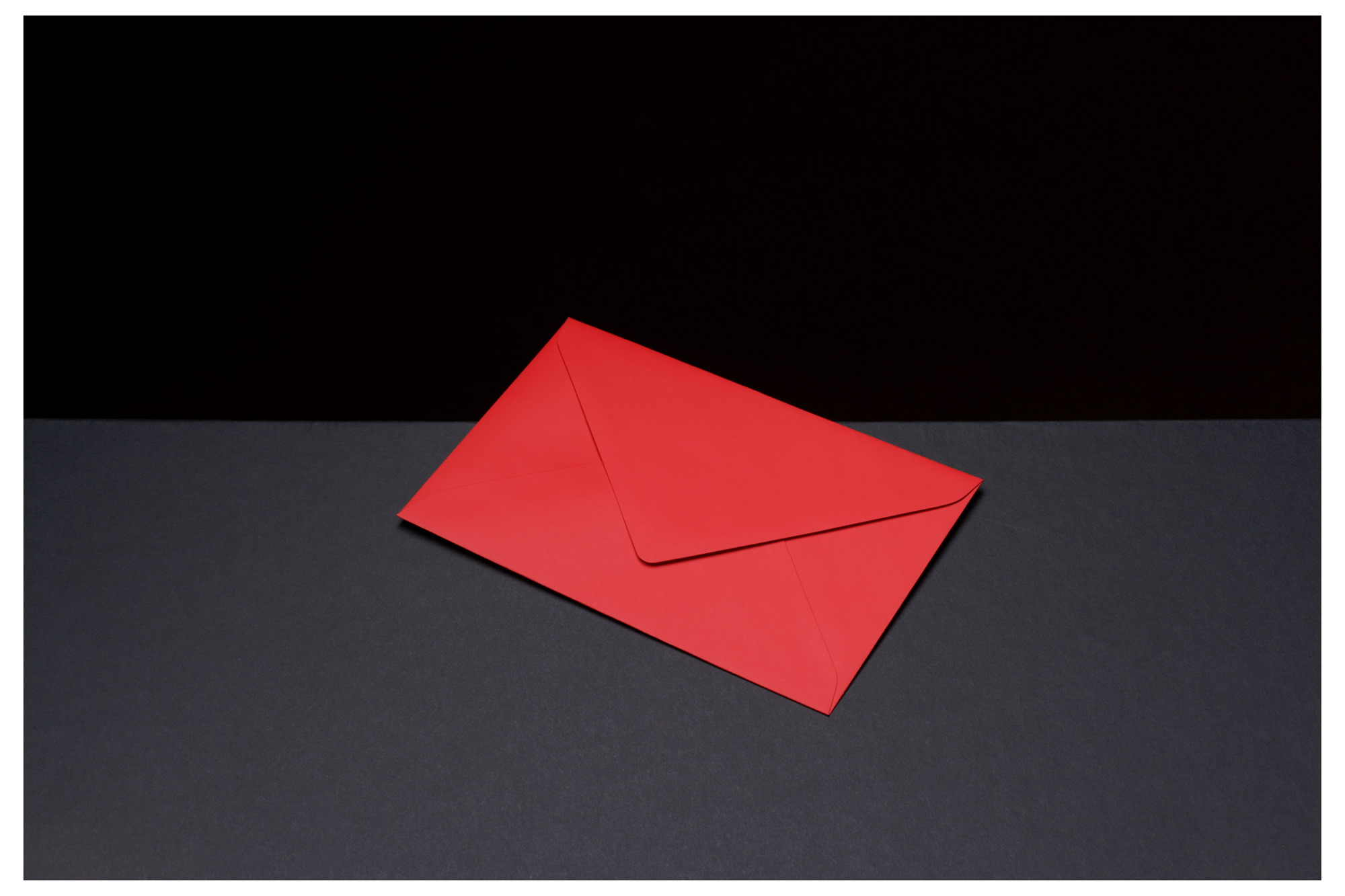
Colored envelops 3 2010

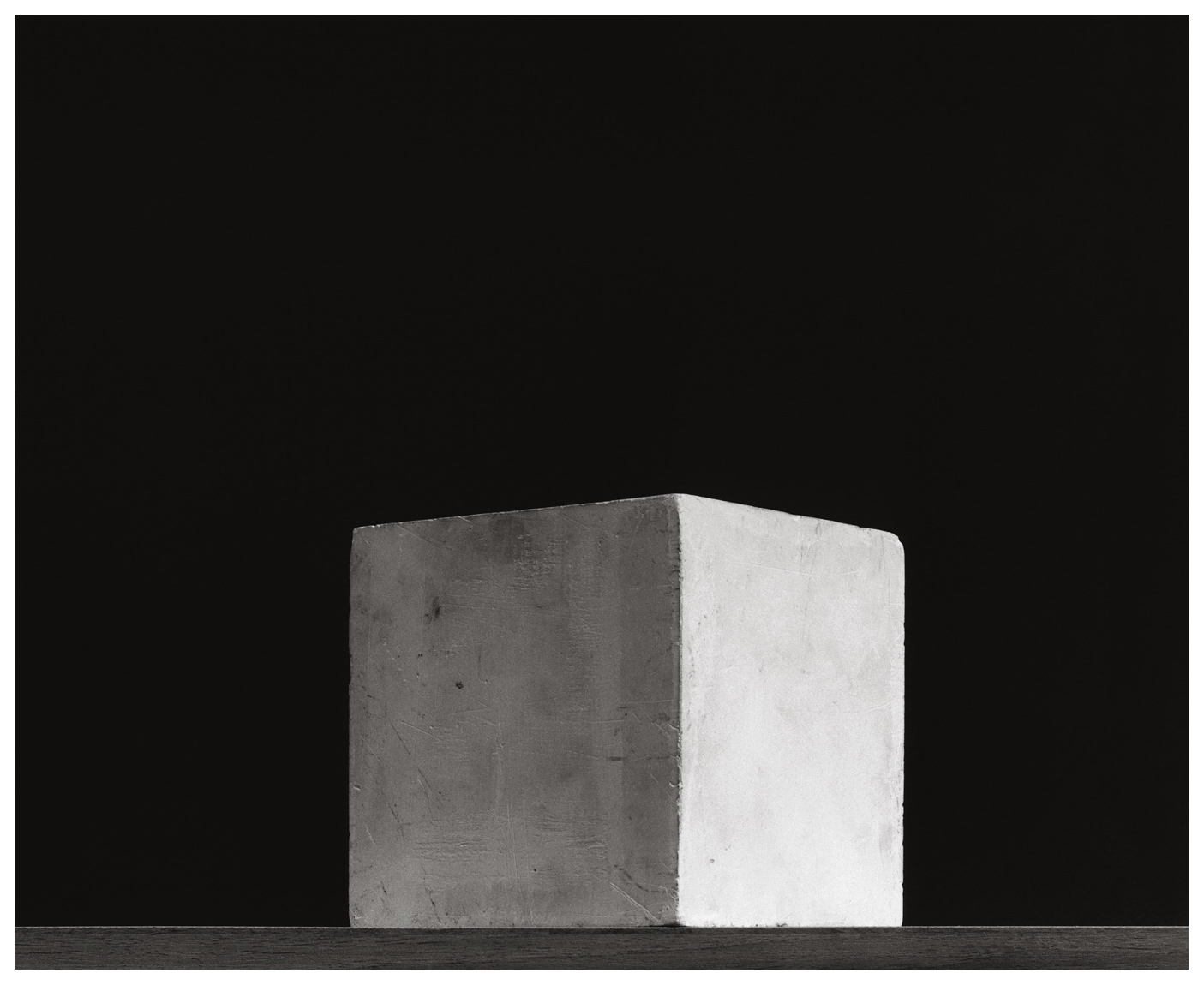
Gypsum 1 2001

== Books and catalogues (selected) ==
- A la recherche du pere, Paris, 1994.
- Aufbruch. Die neue russische Fotografie, Kоеln, 1998.
- Wadim Gutschtschin Meine Dinge, Braunschweig, 1999.
- IDEA Photographic: After Modernism, Santa Fe, 2002.
- Valery Stigneev Century of Photography, 1894-1994, Moscow, 2005.
- Photoestafeta. From Rodchenko to our days, Moscow, 2006.
- Odense Foto Triennale 2006, Odense, Denmark, 2006.
- FotoFest 2006, Houston, TX, 2006.
- Monography Photographs. Vadim Gushchin, Moscow, Publish House Artist and Book, 2008.
- Doors open day Russian art 1989-2009, Moscow Museum of Modern Art, Moscow.
- Contemporary Russian Photography. FotoFest 2012, Houston, TX, 2012.
- Monography Everyday Objects/Cultural Treasures, Schilt Publishing, Amsterdam, 2013.
- Staging Encounters, Lianzhou Fotofestival, 2014.
- Potovisa. Language of Memory, The 7th International Festival of Photography in the Krasnodar Region

== Exhibitions ==
=== Solo exhibitions ===
He has participated in art in exhibitions since 1991 and his first solo exhibition was held in 1995. He has more than 30 solo exhibitions including:

- Meine Dinge, Museum fuer Fotografie, Brunswick, Germany, 1999.
- Exhibition in ROSIZO Gallery, Moscow, 1999.
- Personalismus des Dinges, Kultur Bahnhof Eller, Duesseldorf, Germany.
- Bread and Wood, International Photo-Biennial FotoFest, Houston, US, 2006.
- Breаd, Johannes Larsen Museum, Odense, Denmark, 2006.
- Exhibition in Museum of the History of Photography, Sankt-Petersburg, 2009.
- Aestetik der Statik Alexander Grinberg/Vadim Gushchin in Viktor Grray Gallery, Duesseldorf, 2010.
- Inventory of a Private Library, Blue Sky Gallery, Oregon Center for Photographic Arts, Portland, Oregon, US, 2013.
- Object. Function. Image., Lumière Brothers Photography Сenter, Moscow, 2013.
- Vadim Gushchin. Passed, Month of Photography, Bratislava, Slovakia, 2013.
- Cultural Treasures, International Photo-Festival Lianzhou Foto 2014, Lianzhou, China, 2014.
- Subject Interpretation, 7th International Photofestival PhotoVisa, Krasnodar, Russia. 2015
- Inventory of the Private Library, Lumière Brothers Photography Сenter, Moscow, 2018-2019.http://photography-now.com/exhibition/136126
- Exhibition in the PDNB Gallery, Dallas, Texas, USA, 2019. https://www.facebook.com/PDNBGallery/posts/10156846827722858?comment_id=10156854689087858

=== Group exhibitions ===
He has also participated in more than 50 group exhibitions in galleries and museums in Russia and abroad. His works have been presented in the international and Russian сonceptual group projects, such as:

- A la recherche du pere, 1993—94, Paris, France.
- Neue Fotokunst aus Russland, 1994—95, tour of five German cities.
- Aufbruch. Neue russische Fotografie, 1998, Leverkusen, Germany.
- IDEA Photographic: After Modernism, 2002, Santa Fe, US.
- Odense Photo Triennial, Denmark, 2006.
- In Box of Dreams, (Contemporary Russian Photography), International Photography Festival, Pingyao, China, 2009.
- Doors open day Russian art 1989-2009, Moscow Museum of Modern Art, Moscow, 2009.
- Leben elementar, Trier, Germany, 2010.
- Contemporary Russian Photography, Biennial FotoFest, Houston, US, 2012.
- Museum, look of Photographer, The Pushkin State Museum of Fine Arts, Moscow, 2012.
- Contemporary Russian Photography: From Mystery to Poetry and Back, 5th Seoul Photo 2013, Seoul, Korea, 2013.
- Tarantel 2, Kuenstlerhaus Bethanien, Berlin, Germany, 2013.
- Dinner is Served. The Russian Museum Culinary Companion. The Russian Museum, Sankt-Petersburg. 2013 – 2014.
- "Neue Russische Avangarde. Kunst als Bruecke zwieschen Ost und West." (New Russian Avangarde. Art as Bridge between East and West.) Kellermann Gallery, Duessldorf, Germany. 2015
- "Soviet Photo", Lumiere Brothers Centre for Photography, Moscow. 2015
- "Russian House", Schilt Publishing Gallery, Amsterdam, Holland. 2015
- New Acquisitions. 1998-2014, The Russian Museum, St. Petersburg.
- After Glamour. An artistic analysis of current developments in Russian society. KIT, Düsseldorf, Germany. 2016.http://www.verymagazine.org/very-issue-19/199-overview-issue19/794-after-glamour-moscow-style
- Artist as Hero. International Photography Festival, Pingyao. China. 2018.
- Stillife in Photography, The State Russian Museum, St. Petersburg, Russia. 2018. http://www.rusmuseum.ru/stroganov-palace/exhibitions/still-life-in-photography/#rmPhoto[gallery7972]/1/

== Award ==
- 2007 - The Silver Camera- Award, received 1st place for best report on Moscow in the category of Architecture Moscow

== Collections ==
Gushchin's work is held in the following permanent public collections:

- The Pushkin State Museum of Fine Arts, Moscow.
- The Russian Museum, St. Petersburg
- Museum of Modern Art, Moscow.
- Museum House of Photography, Moscow.
- National Centre of Contemporary Art, Moscow.
- Museum of Moscow, Moscow.
- Museum of Photographic Collections, Moscow.
- Lumiere Brotherth Photography Center, Moscow.
- State Russian Museum of Photography, Nishny Novgorod, Russia.
- Collection of Photograph's Union, Moscow.
- Surgut's Museum of Fine Arts, Surgut, Russia.
- Museum of Fine Art, Santa Fe, New Mexico, US.
- Museum of Fine Art, Houston, Texas, US.
- Santa Barbara Museum of Art, Santa Barbara, California, US.
- Museum Albertina, Vienna, Austria.
- Museum fuer Photographie, Braunschweig, Germany.
- Museet for Fotokunst, Odense, Denmark.
- Museu de Arte Moderna, Rio de Janeiro, Brazil.
- Boghossian Foundation, Brussels, Belgium.
- Spallart Collection, Salzburg, Austria. https://www.sammlung-spallart.at/en/

Private collections in Russia, Germany, France, Italy, Great Britain, the US, South Korea, and Belgium.

== Video about artist and artist's interview ==
- Interview in the Bleek-Magazine, October 2014
- Vadim Gushchin: still-life, made in November 2011 to the opening of Vadim Gushchin's exhibition Kultural treasures in the Gallery Glaz, Moscow.
