= Aleksandr Gushchin (footballer) =

Russian footballer and coach

Personal information
- Full name: Aleksandr Yuryevich Gushchin
- Date of birth: 16 May 1966 (age 60)
- Place of birth: Ivanovo, Russian SFSR
- Height: 1.80 m (5 ft 11 in)
- Position: Defender

Team information
- Current team: FC Tekstilshchik Ivanovo (general director)

Senior career*
Years	Team	Apps	(Gls)
1984	FC Tekstilshchik Ivanovo	20	(0)
1987–1996	FC Tekstilshchik Ivanovo	346	(10)
1997	FC Spartak-Telekom Shuya (amateur)		
1998–2000	FC Spartak-Telekom Shuya	96	(1)
2003–2006	FC Tekstilshchik Ivanovo	79	(0)

Managerial career
- 2007–2009: FC Tekstilshchik Ivanovo (director)
- 2007: FC Tekstilshchik Ivanovo (caretaker)
- 2010: FC Tekstilshchik Ivanovo (assistant)
- 2010–2012: FC Tekstilshchik Ivanovo
- 2012–2013: FC Tekstilshchik Ivanovo (assistant)
- 2013–2014: FC Tom Tomsk (assistant)
- 2016–2017: FC Spartak Kostroma
- 2017–2018: FC Zenit-2 Saint Petersburg (assistant)
- 2018–2023: FC Tekstilshchik Ivanovo (deputy director)
- 2022: FC Tekstilshchik Ivanovo (caretaker)
- 2024–: FC Tekstilshchik Ivanovo (director)
- * Club domestic league appearances and goals

Aleksandr Yuryevich Gushchin (Russian: Александр Юрьевич Гущин; born 16 May 1966) is a Russian professional football coach and a former player. He is the general director of FC Tekstilshchik Ivanovo.
