= Steve Schapiro =

American photographer (1934–2022)

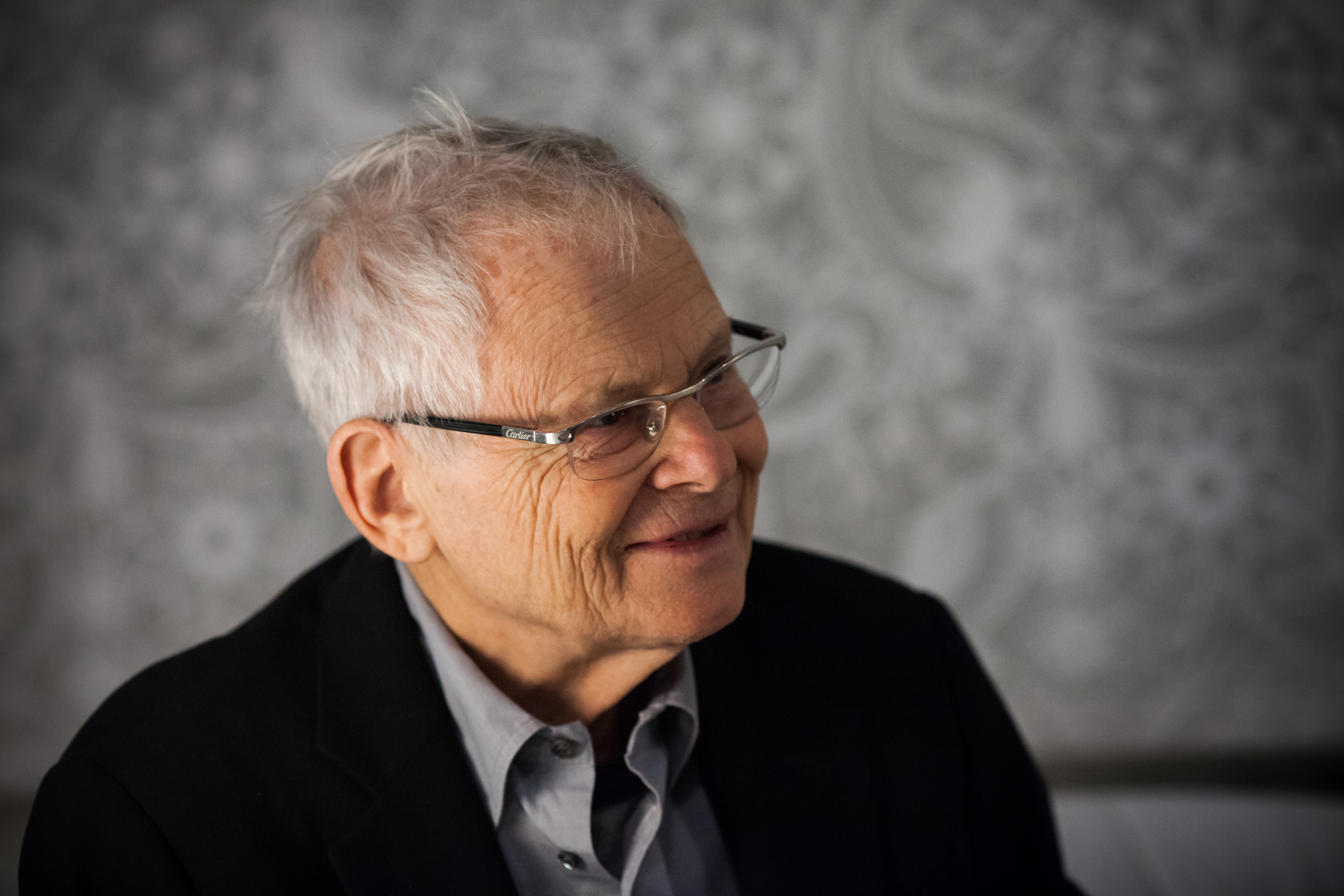
- Schapiro in Moscow, 2012
- Born: November 16, 1934; Brooklyn, New York City, U.S.
- Died: January 15, 2022 (aged 87); Chicago, Illinois, U.S.
- Occupation: Photographer
- Years active: 1961–2022
- Website: www.steveschapiro.com

Steve Schapiro (November 16, 1934 – January 15, 2022) was an American photographer. He is known for his photojournalism work and for having captured key moments of the civil rights movement such as the March on Washington for Jobs and Freedom and the Selma to Montgomery marches. He is also known for his portraits of celebrities and movie stills, most importantly from The Godfather (1972) and Taxi Driver (1976).

== Life and career ==
Schapiro was born on November 16, 1934, in Brooklyn to David Schapiro, a stationery store owner in Rockefeller Center and Esther (Sperling) Schapiro who worked at her husband's stationery store. He discovered photography at the age of nine. Soon he decided to devote himself to photojournalism. One of his role models at the time was the French photographer Henri Cartier-Bresson.

Schapiro took lessons with W. Eugene Smith, an influential photographer during the Second World War. Smith taught him the technical skills and showed him how to develop his own views of the world and of photography.

In 1961 Schapiro began working as a freelance photographer. His photos were published in Life, Look, Vanity Fair, Sports Illustrated, Newsweek, Time and Paris Match. Schapiro also shot the first cover of People, a photo of Mia Farrow in The Great Gatsby.

The political, cultural and social changes of the 1960s in the United States were an inspiration for Schapiro. He accompanied Robert F. Kennedy during his presidential campaign and captured key moments of the civil rights movement such as the March on Washington for Jobs and Freedom or the Selma to Montgomery marches.

In the 1970s, Schapiro focused more on film set photography. Having photographed the movie poster for Midnight Cowboy (1969), he was hired as a photographer by Paramount Pictures. He photographed on the set of The Godfather by Francis Ford Coppola with a cast including Marlon Brando, Al Pacino, James Caan and Robert Duvall. One of his photographs is of "Marlon Brando and the Cat". Schapiro was also present at the film set of Chinatown (1974) by Roman Polanski. Two years later, Schapiro was – by request of Robert De Niro – hired as a photographer on the set of Martin Scorsese's movie Taxi Driver (1976).

He died from pancreatic cancer at his home in Chicago, on January 15, 2022, at the age of 87.

The 2025 documentary Steve Schapiro: Being Everywhere covers his life and career.

== Publications ==
- Steve Schapiro: American Edge. Arena, 2000. ISBN 978-1892041319.
- Schapiro's Heroes. powerHouse, 2007. ISBN 978-1-57687-378-6.
- The Godfather Family Album. Paul Duncan (ed.). Taschen, 2010. ISBN 978-3-8365-8494-4.
- Steve Schapiro: Then and Now. Lonnie Ali, Matthias Harder. Hatje Cantz, 2012. ISBN 978-6-70573426-6.
- Taxi Driver. Paul Duncan (ed.), Taschen, 2013. ISBN 978-3-8365-0008-1.
- Barbra Streisand by Steve Schapiro and Lawrence Schiller. Schapiro, Lawrence Schiller, Patt Morrison, Lawrence Grobel, Nina Wiener (eds.). Taschen, 2014. ISBN 978-3-8365-4240-1.
- Bliss: Transformational Festivals & the Neo Hippie. powerHouse, 2015. ISBN 9781576877630.
- Misericordia: Together We Celebrate. powerHouse, 2016. ISBN 978-1576878170.
- Bowie. powerHouse, 2016. ISBN 9781576878064.
- The Fire Next Time. James Baldwin and Steve Schapiro. Taschen, 2017. ISBN 978-3-8365-7151-7.
- Ali. powerHouse, 2018. ISBN 9781576878392.
- seventy thirty. Damiani, 2022. ISBN 9788862087766.
- Steve Schapiro. Andy Warhol and Friends. Taschen, 2022. ISBN 9783836591515.
