= Lev Borodulin =

Russian-Israeli photographer (1923–2018)

- Лев Бородулин
- Borodulin in 1947
- Born: Lev Abramovich Borodulin; 25 January 1923; Moscow, USSR
- Died: 21 December 2018 (aged 95); Tel Aviv, Israel
- Citizenship: Russia, Israel
- Occupation: Photographer

Lev Abramovich Borodulin (Russian: Лев Абрамович Бородулин; 25 January 1923, Moscow – 21 December 2018, Tel Aviv) was a Russian-born Israeli photographer. He specialized in sports photography.

== Early life ==
Borodulin studied in the art department of Moscow State University of Printing Arts in 1940-1941. He fought in the Great Patriotic War, winning medals for the Defence of Moscow and the Capture of Berlin.

== Career ==
His photography emerged after graduating. His first publication took place in 1947 in the student newspaper.

From 1950–1960 he worked as a photographer for the magazine Ogoniok. He was the first photographer in the Soviet Union to apply a fisheye lens.

The Photography Year Book in 1964 recognized Borodulin as a star of world photography. In 1971 in Munich Borodulin was awarded for achievements in the field of sports photography Olympic gold medal.

In 1972, he moved to Israel and lived in Tel Aviv.

He died on 21 December 2018.

== Recognition ==
- Photographer of the year Asahi Shimbun (1967)
